= 2024–25 Belgian Division 1 =

Belgian Division 1
- Season: 2024–25
- Dates: 31 August 2024 – 29 May 2025
- Promoted: VV: Jong KAA Gent; ACFF: Olympic Charleroi
- Relegated: VV: Cappellen, Heist, Young Reds Antwerp; ACFF: Binche, Tournai
- Matches: 432
- Top goalscorer: VV: Yacine Bentayeb (22 goals); ACFF: Léandro Rousseau (22 goals)

The 2024–25 Belgian Division 1 is the ninth season of the third-tier football league. It is the first season in which the division is split into two groups VV and ACFF.

== Team changes ==
=== Out ===
- RAAL La Louvière were promoted to the Challenger Pro League as champions.
- Lokeren-Temse were promoted to the Challenger Pro League as runners-up.
- Sint-Eloois-Winkel folded at the end of last season.
- Visé was refused a license and forced to relegate.

=== In ===
- SL16 FC were relegated from the Challenger Pro League.
- Belisia Bilzen and Mons as champions in the VV B and ACFF divisions of the Belgian Division 2.
- Ninove was automatically promoted as runners-up of the VV A division of the Belgian Division 2 as champions Eendracht Aalst had been refused a license.
- On VV-side, four teams were promoted via the Promotion play-offs VV: Jong Cercle, Hasselt, Lyra-Lierse Berlaar and Merelbeke.
- On ACFF-side, all four teams taking part in the Promotion play-offs ACFF were promoted: Binche, Rochefort, Tournai and Tubize-Braine.
- Furthermore, two more spots were available on ACFF side, awarded to highest eligible finishers Stockay and Union SG B.

== Format changes ==
Expanding regionalization to all of amateur football for this season saw the league's twenty-eight teams split into two groups:

- VV consisting of sixteen teams, which will play 30 matches with no play-off.
- ACFF consisting of twelve teams, which will play 22 matches with play-off matches, as finishing top six clubs will battle for promotion play-off and bottom six clubs will battle for relegation play-off.

== VV ==
Locations of the 2024–25 Belgian National Division 1 VV teams

=== League table ===
| Pos | Team | Pld | W | D | L | GF | GA | GD | Pts | Qualification or relegation |
|---|---|---|---|---|---|---|---|---|---|---|
| 1 | Jong KAA Gent (C, P) | 30 | 19 | 5 | 6 | 63 | 31 | 32 | 62 | Promoted to the Challenger Pro League |
| 2 | Knokke | 30 | 14 | 14 | 2 | 53 | 31 | 22 | 56 | |
| 3 | Hasselt | 30 | 15 | 7 | 8 | 50 | 28 | 22 | 52 | |
| 4 | Tienen | 30 | 14 | 4 | 12 | 39 | 34 | 5 | 46 | |
| 5 | Dessel | 30 | 13 | 7 | 10 | 62 | 47 | 15 | 46 | |
| 6 | Thes | 30 | 12 | 9 | 9 | 50 | 42 | 8 | 45 | |
| 7 | Ninove | 30 | 12 | 7 | 11 | 39 | 40 | −1 | 43 | |
| 8 | Lyra-Lierse Berlaar | 30 | 11 | 10 | 9 | 58 | 51 | 7 | 43 | |
| 9 | Jong Cercle | 30 | 12 | 4 | 14 | 54 | 53 | 1 | 40 | |
| 10 | Belisia | 30 | 10 | 9 | 11 | 38 | 43 | −5 | 39 | |
| 11 | Hoogstraten | 30 | 10 | 8 | 12 | 43 | 45 | −2 | 38 | |
| 12 | OH Leuven U-23 | 30 | 10 | 6 | 14 | 46 | 53 | −7 | 36 | |
| 13 | Merelbeke | 30 | 8 | 7 | 15 | 33 | 53 | −20 | 31 | |
| 14 | Cappellen (R) | 30 | 8 | 5 | 17 | 40 | 72 | −32 | 29 | Relegation to Division 2 |
| 15 | Young Reds Antwerp (R) | 30 | 6 | 10 | 14 | 34 | 50 | −16 | 28 | Relegation to Division 2 |
| 16 | Heist (R) | 30 | 6 | 8 | 16 | 37 | 66 | −29 | 26 | Relegation to Division 2 |

Source: Nationaal : 1st klasse (in Dutch)
Rules for classification: 1) Points; 2) Matches won; 3) Goal difference; 4) Goals scored; 5) Away goals scored; 6) Away matches won.
(C) Champion; (P) Promoted; (R) Relegated

=== Results ===
| Home \ Away | TIE | GNT | BEL | HAS | NIN | KNO | TES | HOO | LLB | DES | CER | CAP | YRA | OHL | MER | HEI |
|---|---|---|---|---|---|---|---|---|---|---|---|---|---|---|---|---|
| Tienen | — | 1–0 | 1–0 | 2–1 | 1–0 | 0–0 | 3–2 | 2–0 | 0–3 | 2–1 | 0–3 | 4–0 | 2–1 | 0–4 | 2–0 | 3–0 |
| Jong KAA Gent | 2–0 | — | 0–1 | 1–2 | 2–1 | 2–1 | 2–2 | 2–0 | 4–0 | 3–1 | 1–0 | 4–0 | 1–1 | 1–0 | 2–2 | 2–2 |
| Belisia | 0–4 | 1–1 | — | 0–4 | 1–2 | 2–2 | 2–1 | 2–0 | 2–1 | 1–3 | 3–0 | 1–2 | 2–0 | 3–2 | 1–1 | 2–3 |
| Hasselt | 2–1 | 0–3 | 0–0 | — | 1–0 | 1–1 | 0–0 | 3–1 | 3–0 | 2–0 | 1–1 | 3–0 | 3–0 | 1–0 | 0–2 | 2–1 |
| Ninove | 2–0 | 3–1 | 2–1 | 0–4 | — | 1–0 | 2–1 | 0–0 | 3–3 | 1–1 | 2–1 | 4–0 | 0–1 | 2–0 | 2–0 | 2–2 |
| Knokke | 2–0 | 1–0 | 1–1 | 2–2 | 3–0 | — | 1–1 | 1–1 | 3–1 | 3–0 | 4–3 | 2–2 | 1–0 | 2–0 | 3–2 | 2–1 |
| Thes | 0–1 | 2–2 | 0–0 | 2–1 | 2–1 | 2–2 | — | 3–2 | 3–3 | 1–1 | 3–0 | 4–3 | 2–1 | 1–1 | 5–0 | 1–1 |
| Hoogstraten | 0–0 | 0–4 | 3–0 | 1–0 | 2–0 | 1–2 | 0–2 | — | 1–2 | 0–1 | 2–4 | 0–1 | 1–1 | 3–0 | 2–1 | 2–1 |
| Lyra-Lierse Berlaar | 2–2 | 1–2 | 4–0 | 1–0 | 2–2 | 3–3 | 0–3 | 2–2 | — | 2–2 | 0–1 | 2–2 | 2–2 | 1–1 | 4–1 | 3–0 |
| Dessel | 2–1 | 1–3 | 0–0 | 1–1 | 4–2 | 2–2 | 5–0 | 2–3 | 5–1 | — | 3–2 | 4–1 | 2–2 | 4–1 | 3–1 | 0–1 |
| Jong Cercle | 1–0 | 0–4 | 0–0 | 2–1 | 1–2 | 0–0 | 0–4 | 2–4 | 2–3 | 2–3 | — | 5–1 | 4–1 | 2–0 | 0–0 | 4–2 |
| Cappellen | 2–1 | 2–3 | 1–3 | 4–5 | 0–1 | 0–4 | 2–1 | 1–1 | 0–3 | 1–2 | 1–2 | — | 2–2 | 2–2 | 1–0 | 3–2 |
| Young Reds Antwerp | 2–0 | 0–3 | 0–4 | 0–0 | 0–0 | 0–1 | 0–1 | 2–2 | 1–0 | 2–1 | 0–4 | 1–0 | — | 3–3 | 1–2 | 5–0 |
| OH Leuven U23 | 1–3 | 0–2 | 4–2 | 1–0 | 2–1 | 1–2 | 3–1 | 1–4 | 0–2 | 3–2 | 3–2 | 5–0 | 4–3 | — | 1–0 | 1–1 |
| Merelbeke | 0–0 | 0–3 | 0–0 | 0–3 | 3–0 | 1–1 | 3–0 | 1–3 | 0–5 | 1–5 | 4–2 | 0–1 | 1–1 | 2–1 | — | 3–0 |
| Heist | 1–0 | 4–3 | 1–3 | 1–4 | 1–1 | 1–1 | 0–1 | 2–2 | 1–2 | 2–1 | 1–4 | 1–5 | 2–1 | 1–1 | 1–2 | — |

Updated to match(es) played on 7 May 2025. Source: Nationaal : 1st klasse (in Dutch)
Legend: Blue = home team win; Yellow = draw; Red = away team win.

=== Season statistics ===
==== Top scorers ====
As of 7 May 2025.

| Rank | Player | Club | Goals |
|---|---|---|---|
| 1 | (France) Yacine Bentayeb | Dessel | 22 |
| 2 | (Nigeria) Umar Abubakar | Jong KAA Gent | 21 |
| 3 | (Belgium) Stan Braem | Knokke | 19 |
| 4 | (Belgium) Tibe Vanhaeren | Thes | 16 |
| 5 | (Belgium) Nicolas Orye | Hasselt | 15 |
| 5 | (Belgium) Jordy Peffer | Lyra-Lierse Berlaar | |
| 6 | (Belgium) Jef Colman | Heist | 13 |
| 7 | (Belgium) Laurens Symons | Cappellen | 12 |
| 8 | (Belgium) Mehdi Bounou | Hasselt | 11 |
| 9 | (Belgium) Javan Ngoyi | Dessel | 10 |
| 10 | (Nigeria) Abubakar Abdullahi | Jong KAA Gent | 9 |
| 10 | (Burundi) Vancy Mabanza | Tienen | 9 |
| 10 | (Belgium) Jassim Mazouz | Jong KAA Gent | 9 |
| 10 | (Belgium) Sam Valcke | Hasselt; Belisia | 9 |
| 10 | (Armenia) Ivan Yagan | Tienen | |
| 11 | (Belgium) Nico Binst | Merelbeke | 8 |
| 11 | (Belgium) Alain Lufira | Ninove | 8 |
| 11 | (Belgium) Louange Muhire | Ninove; Knokke | 8 |
| 11 | (Belgium) Jeroen Meeuwis | Hoogstraten | 8 |
| 11 | (Belgium) Justin Pieters | Knokke | 8 |
| 11 | (Luxembourg) Lucas Prudhomme | Knokke | 8 |
| 11 | (Belgium) Luka Vereecken | Young Reds | |
| 11 | (Belgium) Tiemen Wijnen | Belisia Bilzen | |

7 goals (9 players)
- (South Korea) Seong-heon Baik (Belisia)
- (Belgium) Alama Bayo (Jong Cercle)
- (Belgium) Amadou Diallo (OH Leuven U23)
- (Belgium) Mamadou Diallo (Cappellen)
- (Belgium) Ayoub El Harrak (Tienen)
- (Ghana) Richard Antwi Manu (Merelbeke)
- (Belgium) Maxim Meert (Ninove)
- (Belgium) Franck Idumbo-Muzambo (OH Leuven U23)
- (Belgium) Tim Jeunen (Thes)
6 goals (10 players)
- (Belgium) Noah De Ridder (Jong Cercle)
- (Belgium) Tibe De Vlieger (Jong KAA Gent)
- (Belgium) Fallou Fall (Hoogstraten)
- (Belgium) Xander Martlé (Jong Cercle)
- (Belgium) Jonathan Mfumu (Hoogstraten)
- (Belgium) Tomas Muyldermans (Lyra-Lierse Berlaar)
- (Belgium) Hannes Smolders (Dessel)
- (Belgium) Bernd Stassen (Belisia)
- (Belgium) Mathieu Troonbeeckx (Heist)
- (Belgium) Ono Vanackere (Jong Cercle)
5 goals (11 players)
- (Belgium) Ilias Bouhlal (Tienen)
- (Turkey) Hasan Bulut (OH Leuven U23)
- (Belgium) Dré Callens (Jong Cercle)
- (Belgium) Andries Claes (Thes)
- (Belgium) Jef De Block (Jong Cercle)
- (Belgium) Yannick Reuten (Heist (2) & Thes (3))
- (Belgium) Jiri Struyf (Hoogstraten)
- (Netherlands) Ruben Tilburgs (Hoogstraten)
- (Belgium) Mauro Trari (Dessel)
- (Belgium) Chike Van De Ven (OH Leuven U23)
- (Belgium) Endrit Voca (Hoogstraten)
4 goals (22 players)
- (Ivory Coast) Farouck Adekami (Young Reds Antwerp)
- (Belgium) Amine Benfriha (OH Leuven U23)
- (Belgium) Ilias Breugelmans (OH Leuven U23)
- (Belgium) Søren Coens (Jong Cercle)
- (Belgium) Andy Dauwe (Hasselt)
- (Belgium) Jari De Vriendt (Ninove)
- (Netherlands) Nelson Egah (Young Reds Antwerp)
- (Belgium) Hugo Eugène (OH Leuven U23)
- (Belgium) Noah Gijdé (Jong Cercle)
- (Belgium) Faysel Kasmi (Dessel)
- (Belgium) Robbe Kil (Cappellen)
- (Belgium) Jordi Maus (Belisia)
- (The Gambia) Basiru Mbye (Knokke)
- (Belgium) Livio Milts (Hasselt)
- (Belgium) Ilias Mjahed (Merelbeke)
- (Netherlands) Mehdi Naqqadi (Thes)
- (Belgium) Terry Osei-Berkoe (Hasselt)
- (Belgium) Mathéo Parmentier (OH Leuven U23)
- (Belgium) Mathias Schils (Lyra-Lierse Berlaar)
- (Belgium) Gerard Vandeplas (Young Reds Antwerp)
- (Belgium) Lennert Versmissen (Lyra-Lierse Berlaar)
- (Belgium) Maxim Volant (Lyra-Lierse Berlaar)
3 goals (19 players)
- (Belgium) Jason Adesanya (Lyra-Lierse Berlaar)
- (Belgium) Yannis Augustijnen (Heist)
- (Morocco) Youssef Boulaouali (Lyra-Lierse Berlaar)
- (Belgium) Malik De Drie (Merelbeke)
- (Belgium) Gilles Degryse (Jong Cercle)
- (Netherlands) Stef de Wijs (Hoogstraten)
- (Belgium) Faissal El Attabi (Dessel)
- (Belgium) Seppe Geukens (Dessel)
- (Belgium) Nick Hulsmans (Thes)
- (Belgium) Ilan Hurtevent (Knokke)
- (Belgium) Sirajedinne Ibn El Mokadem (Lyra-Lierse Berlaar)
- (Belgium) Seppe Kil (Lyra-Lierse Berlaar)
- (Belgium) Senda Mukandila (Thes)
- (Belgium) Joaquin Obambi (Jong Cercle)
- (Belgium) Fabio Sposito (Dessel)
- (Belgium) Gyano Vanderdonck (Jong KAA Gent)
- (Belgium) Rune Van Den Bergh (Jong KAA Gent)
- (Belgium) Glenn Van Hout (Heist)
- (Belgium) Thomas Van Zantvoort (Cappellen)
2 goals (31 players)
- (Belgium) Obed Agyapong (Young Reds Antwerp)
- (Togo) Abdel-Malik Aziz (Young Reds Antwerp)
- (Belgium) Xander Balcaen (Merelbeke)
- (Belgium) Senne Ceulemans (Tienen)
- (Belgium) Siemen Cloots (Cappellen)
- (Belgium) Lars Cooman (Knokke)
- (Belgium) Antoine De Bodt (Knokke)
- (Belgium) Milan De Mey (Merelbeke)
- (Belgium) Gilles De Meyer (Jong KAA Gent)
- (Belgium) David De Schutter (Cappellen)
- (Belgium) Rayan El Bahri (Jong Cercle)
- (Ivory Coast) Hyllarion Goore (Jong KAA Gent)
- (Netherlands) Dion Jochems (Hoogstraten)
- (Cameroon) Dibola Júnior (Ninove)
- (Belgium) Mathis Heyselberghs (Heist)
- (Belgium) Kobe Lemmens (Heist)
- (Belgium) Yoshi Mariën (Ninove)
- (Belgium) Beni Mpanzu (Jong Cercle)
- (Belgium) Japhet Muanza (Hasselt)
- (Belgium) Nando Nöstlinger (Cappellen)
- (England) Amardeep Singh (Tienen)
- (Belgium) Mike Smet (Heist)
- (Belgium) Tibeau Swinnen (Thes)
- (Belgium) Cel Teunen (Lyra-Lierse Berlaar)
- (Belgium) Sam Vanaken (Thes)
- (Belgium) Dieter Vanhees (Cappellen)
- (Belgium) Lucas Vankerkhoven (Hasselt)
- (Belgium) Ruben Vanraefelghem (Knokke)
- (Belgium) Senne Van Dooren (Hoogstraten)
- (Belgium) Elias Van Den Borre (Ninove)
- (Belgium) Gianni Vets (Lyra-Lierse Berlaar)
1 goal (74 players)
- (Belgium) Alessandro Bongiorno (Belisia)
- (Belgium) Matthiece Nelissen (Belisia)
- (Belgium) Frederik Spruyt (Belisia)
- (Belgium) Falke Vandecaetsbeek (Belisia)
- (Belgium) Jamie Yayi Mpie (Belisia)
- (Belgium) Stallone Limbombe (Cappellen)
- (Belgium) Seppe Somers (Cappellen)
- (Belgium) Haroun Sylla (Cappellen)
- (Belgium) Arne Naudts (Dessel)
- (Belgium) Robbe Quirynen (Dessel)
- (Belgium) Arno Van Keilegom (Dessel)
- (Belgium) Yassin Gueroui (Hasselt)
- (Belgium) Kel Ofori (Hasselt)
- (Belgium) Mathise Reumers (Hasselt)
- (Republic of the Congo) Scott Bitsindou (Heist)
- (Belgium) Mylan Carrasco (Heist)
- (Belgium) Matt Jannes (Heist)
- (Netherlands) Keone Maho (Heist) (0) & (Hasselt) (1)
- (Belgium) Vic Van Osselaer (Hoogstraten)
- (Belgium) Sebbe Gheerardyns (Jong Cercle)
- (Belgium) Wout Asselmann (Jong KAA Gent)
- (Haiti) Tristan Demetrius (Jong KAA Gent)
- (Belgium) Mohammed El Âdfaoui (Jong KAA Gent)
- (Netherlands) Aimé Omgba (Jong KAA Gent)
- (Belgium) Briek Van Hoorick (Jong KAA Gent)
- (Belgium) Hannes Vernemmen (Jong KAA Gent)
- (Belgium) Matties Volckaert (Jong KAA Gent)
- (Ukraine) Ruslan Vydysh (Jong KAA Gent)
- (Belgium) Amadu Jalloh (Knokke)
- (Belgium) Nils Pierre (Knokke)
- (Belgium) Bryan Van Den Bogaert (Knokke)
- (Belgium) Sebbe Augustijns (Lyra-Lierse Berlaar)
- (Belgium) Mathias Nys (Lyra-Lierse Berlaar)
- (Belgium) Bent Reijniers (Lyra-Lierse Berlaar)
- (Belgium) Max De Ruyver (Merelbeke)
- (Belgium) Ilias El Hamdaoui (Merelbeke)
- (Belgium) Merijn Rogiers (Merelbeke)
- (Belgium) Jur Schryvers (Merelbeke)
- (The Gambia) Lamin Soli (Merelbeke)
- (Belgium) Yohen Tangala (Merelbeke)
- (Belgium) Gillis Verhelst (Merelbeke)
- (Belgium) Steve Bael (Ninove)
- (Belgium) Stéphane Chirishungu (Ninove)
- (Belgium) Nathan De Raes (Ninove)
- (Belgium) Marco Hertveldt (Ninove)
- (Belgium) Adam Karmaoui (Ninove)
- (Belgium) Jarno Jourquin (Ninove)
- (Belgium) Dennis Van Vaerenbergh (Ninove)
- (Ukraine) Andriy Vieru (Ninove)
- (Morocco) Mohamed Yassine Azzouz (OH Leuven U23)
- (Belgium) Soufiane Hassouan (OH Leuven U23)
- (Belgium) Matteo Heremans (OH Leuven U23)
- (Belgium) Eli Honnof (OH Leuven U23)
- (Albania) Kevin Shkurti (OH Leuven U23)
- (Belgium) Noa Wyns (OH Leuven U23)
- (Belgium) Daan Karremans (Thes)
- (Netherlands) Mitchel Keulen (Thes)
- (Belgium) Andreas Mele (Thes)
- (Belgium) Christiaan Vaes (Thes)
- (Belgium) Marnick Vermijl (Thes)
- (Belgium) Vincent De Vos (Tienen)
- (Belgium) Jorte Jacobs (Tienen)
- (Belgium) Glodi Mbuyi-Mbayo (Tienen)
- (Belgium) Hannes Meeus (Tienen)
- (Belgium) Elaïjah Stalmans (Tienen)
- (Belgium) Abderrahman Amal (Young Reds Antwerp)
- (France) Jean Butez (Young Reds Antwerp)
- (Belgium) Arne Cassaert (Young Reds Antwerp)
- (Morocco) Youssef Hamdaoui (Young Reds Antwerp)
- (Belgium) Milo Horemans (Young Reds Antwerp)
- (Kosovo) Laurit Krasniqi (Young Reds Antwerp)
- (Belgium) Milan Smits (Young Reds Antwerp)
- (Belgium) Alexandre Stanic (Young Reds Antwerp)
- (Belgium) Mohamed Waki (Young Reds Antwerp)
2 own goals (1 player)
- (Belgium) Maxim Volant (Lyra-Lierse Berlaar, scored for Belisia and Young Reds Antwerp)
1 own goal (10 players)
- (Belgium) Nando Nöstlinger (Cappellen, scored for Hasselt)
- (Belgium) Seppe Somers (Cappellen, scored for Dessel)
- (Belgium) Lars Michiels (Dessel, scored for Lyra-Lierse Berlaar)
- (Belgium) Axel Dierickx (Heist, scored for Cappellen)
- (Belgium) Jouk Vermeeren (Hoogstraten, scored for Heist)
- (Belgium) Mats Sterkens (Lyra-Lierse Berlaar, scored for Dessel)
- (Belgium) Gianni Vets (Lyra-Lierse Berlaar, scored for Cappellen)
- (Belgium) Koen Weuts (Lyra-Lierse Berlaar, scored for Dessel)
- (Belgium) Gillis Verhelst (Merelbeke, scored for Cappellen)
- (Belgium) Sam Vanaken (Thes, scored for Belisia)

== ACFF ==
Locations of the 2024–25 Belgian National Division 1 ACFF teams

=== Regular season ===
==== League table ====
| Pos | Team | Pld | W | D | L | GF | GA | GD | Pts | Qualification or relegation |
|---|---|---|---|---|---|---|---|---|---|---|
| 1 | Olympic Charleroi | 22 | 15 | 4 | 3 | 54 | 23 | 31 | 49 | Qualification for Promotion play-offs |
| 2 | Tubize-Braine | 22 | 14 | 5 | 3 | 51 | 20 | 31 | 47 | Qualification for Promotion play-offs |
| 3 | Mons | 22 | 13 | 7 | 2 | 39 | 14 | 25 | 46 | Qualification for Promotion play-offs |
| 4 | Virton | 22 | 14 | 2 | 6 | 38 | 26 | 12 | 44 | Qualification for Promotion play-offs |
| 5 | Stockay | 22 | 9 | 4 | 9 | 31 | 31 | 0 | 31 | Qualification for Promotion play-offs |
| 6 | Rochefort | 22 | 8 | 7 | 7 | 27 | 29 | −2 | 31 | Qualification for Promotion play-offs |
| 7 | Union Namur | 22 | 7 | 3 | 12 | 25 | 40 | −15 | 24 | Qualification for Relegation play-offs |
| 8 | Binche | 22 | 5 | 7 | 10 | 29 | 40 | −11 | 22 | Qualification for Relegation play-offs |
| 9 | Zébra Élites | 22 | 5 | 7 | 10 | 20 | 36 | −16 | 22 | Qualification for Relegation play-offs |
| 10 | Union SG B | 22 | 5 | 5 | 12 | 25 | 38 | −13 | 20 | Qualification for Relegation play-offs |
| 11 | Tournai | 22 | 4 | 8 | 10 | 18 | 34 | −16 | 20 | Qualification for Relegation play-offs |
| 12 | SL16 FC | 22 | 2 | 3 | 17 | 19 | 45 | −26 | 9 | Qualification for Relegation play-offs |

Source: Nationaal : 1st klasse (in Dutch)
Rules for classification: 1) Points; 2) Matches won; 3) Goal difference; 4) Goals scored; 5) Away goals scored; 6) Away matches won.

==== Results ====
| Home \ Away | OLC | TUB | MON | VIR | STO | ROC | UNA | BIN | ZEB | USG | TOU | STL |
|---|---|---|---|---|---|---|---|---|---|---|---|---|
| Olympic Charleroi | — | 3–2 | 0–0 | 2–1 | 2–1 | 2–3 | 3–0 | 4–1 | 3–0 | 1–1 | 2–0 | 3–1 |
| Tubize-Braine | 4–1 | — | 0–0 | 0–1 | 1–2 | 6–2 | 2–1 | 1–0 | 4–2 | 2–1 | 3–1 | 3–0 |
| Mons | 2–2 | 1–1 | — | 0–1 | 2–0 | 1–0 | 3–1 | 5–0 | 1–1 | 2–0 | 2–0 | 3–1 |
| Virton | 0–2 | 0–3 | 0–2 | — | 1–0 | 1–3 | 1–0 | 2–0 | 0–1 | 4–2 | 1–1 | 3–1 |
| Stockay | 1–4 | 1–1 | 0–1 | 2–3 | — | 2–1 | 5–1 | 1–1 | 3–2 | 3–0 | 1–1 | 2–1 |
| Rochefort | 2–1 | 1–1 | 0–0 | 0–2 | 0–0 | — | 0–3 | 1–1 | 2–2 | 1–3 | 1–0 | 1–0 |
| Union Namur | 3–3 | 1–4 | 0–5 | 1–3 | 1–0 | 0–2 | — | 2–3 | 2–0 | 0–0 | 1–0 | 2–1 |
| Binche | 0–3 | 1–3 | 0–2 | 1–4 | 0–2 | 2–1 | 1–1 | — | 1–2 | 1–1 | 2–1 | 5–0 (Note: The match between Binche and SL16 FC ended 1–2, but the result was converted into a 5–0 forfeit win for Binche as SL16 FC was not able to provide the identity documents for all players present.) |
| Zébra Élites | 0–4 | 0–5 (Note: The match between Zébra Élites and Tubize-Braine ended 2–2, but the result was converted into a 0–5 forfeit win for Tubize-Braine as Zébra Élites had fielded a player who was ineligible at the initial date the match would have been played. The match had been postponed by three weeks due to snowfall and the player had been signed between the original and the new date, which by the rules meant he was still ineligible.) | 3–2 | 1–3 | 0–2 | 0–0 | 1–0 | 1–1 | — | 0–0 | 1–2 | 0–0 |
| Union SG B | 0–2 | 0–3 | 2–3 | 1–2 | 5–1 | 0–3 | 2–1 | 0–5 (Note: The match between Union SG B and Binche ended 2–2, but the result was converted into a 0–5 forfeit win for Binche as Union SG B did not comply with regulation B4.121 which states that at least half of the registered players must have been trained in the club and at least two-thirds of all registered players have been trained in Belgium.) | 0–0 | — | 4–0 | 0–2 |
| Tournai | 0–4 | 1–1 | 0–0 | 2–2 | 2–0 | 1–1 | 1–2 | 1–1 | 1–0 | 2–0 | — | 0–0 |
| SL16 FC | 1–3 | 0–1 | 1–2 | 1–2 | 1–2 | 1–2 | 0–2 | 2–2 | 0–3 | 0–3 | 5–1 | — |

Source: Nationaal : 1st klasse (in Dutch)
Legend: Blue = home team win; Yellow = draw; Red = away team win.

=== Play-offs ===
==== Promotion play-offs ====
| Pos | Team | Pld | W | D | L | GF | GA | GD | Pts | Qualification or relegation | OLC | TUB | MON | VIR | ROC | STO |
|---|---|---|---|---|---|---|---|---|---|---|---|---|---|---|---|---|
| 1 | Olympic Charleroi (C, P) | 10 | 7 | 1 | 2 | 24 | 12 | 12 | 47 | Promoted to Challenger Pro League | — | 2–2 | 2–0 | 5–3 | 0–2 | 5–1 |
| 2 | Tubize-Braine | 10 | 6 | 3 | 1 | 13 | 6 | 7 | 45 | | 1–2 | — | 1–0 | 0–0 | 2–1 | 3–0 |
| 3 | Mons | 10 | 3 | 4 | 3 | 9 | 10 | −1 | 36 | | 0–1 | 1–1 | — | 1–1 | 0–0 | 4–3 |
| 4 | Virton | 10 | 2 | 4 | 4 | 8 | 11 | −3 | 32 | | 1–0 | 0–1 | 0–1 | — | 1–1 | 2–1 |
| 5 | Rochefort | 10 | 2 | 5 | 3 | 7 | 9 | −2 | 27 | | 0–3 | 0–1 | 1–1 | 0–0 | — | 1–0 |
| 6 | Stockay | 10 | 1 | 1 | 8 | 9 | 22 | −13 | 20 | | 2–4 | 0–1 | 0–1 | 1–0 | 1–1 | — |

Source: Nationaal : 1ste Nationale acff PO+ (in Dutch)
Rules for classification: 1) Points; 2) Matches won; 3) Goal difference; 4) Goals scored; 5) Away goals scored; 6) Away matches won.
(C) Champion; (P) Promoted

==== Relegation play-offs ====
| Pos | Team | Pld | W | D | L | GF | GA | GD | Pts | Qualification or relegation | ZEB | USG | UNA | BIN | STL | TOU |
|---|---|---|---|---|---|---|---|---|---|---|---|---|---|---|---|---|
| 1 | Zébra Élites | 10 | 5 | 4 | 1 | 16 | 10 | 6 | 30 | | — | 1–0 | 1–1 | 2–1 | 0–1 | 1–1 |
| 2 | Union SG B | 10 | 5 | 2 | 3 | 18 | 8 | 10 | 27 | | 1–3 | — | 4–0 | 5–1 | 0–1 | 2–0 |
| 3 | Union Namur | 10 | 2 | 5 | 3 | 7 | 11 | −4 | 23 | | 0–2 | 0–3 | — | 2–0 | 0–0 | 3–0 |
| 4 | Binche (Note: Binche was refused a license to play in the Belgian Division 1 for the 2025-26 season and is hence considered to be finishing last and will occupy one of the relegation spots. The club has announced it will not appeal the decision.) (R) | 10 | 1 | 5 | 4 | 9 | 16 | −7 | 19 | Relegated to Division 2 | 2–2 | 0–1 | 1–1 | — | 1–0 | 0–0 |
| 5 | SL16 FC | 10 | 3 | 5 | 2 | 9 | 8 | 1 | 19 | | 2–3 | 1–1 | 0–0 | 2–2 | — | 0–0 |
| 6 | Tournai (R) | 10 | 0 | 7 | 3 | 5 | 11 | −6 | 17 | Relegated to Division 2 | 1–1 (Note: Following a collision of heads, Tournai player Lemuel Ntalu suffered a cardiac arrest and was reanimated during the match between Tournai and Zébra Élites of 1 March, at a score of 1–0 and with 53 minutes played. The match was stopped and replayed entirely on 18 April.) | 1–1 | 0–0 | 1–1 | 1–2 | — |

Source: Nationaal : 1ste Nationale acff PO– (in Dutch)
Rules for classification: 1) Points; 2) Points after deduction of possible half point gained through rounding; 3) Matches won.
(R) Relegated

=== Season statistics ===
==== Top scorers ====
As of 5 May 2025.

| Rank | Player | Club | Goals |
|---|---|---|---|
| 1 | (Belgium) Léandro Rousseau | Olympic Charleroi | 20 |
| 2 | (Equatorial Guinea) Cristian Makaté | Union SG B | 19 |
| 3 | (Belgium) Roman Ferber | Olympic Charleroi | 13 |
| 4 | (Belgium) Dieudonné Lwangi | Union Namur | 12 |
| 5 | (Belgium) Tyron Crame | Tubize-Braine | 11 |
| 5 | (Ivory Coast) Sekou Koné | Stockay | 11 |
| 7 | (Belgium) Dylan De Belder | Mons | 10 |
| 7 | (Guinea) Oumar Traoré | Binche | 10 |
| 9 | (Belgium) Nelson Azevedo-Janelas | Union SG B | 9 |
| 9 | (Belgium) Qendrim Bakija | Stockay | 9 |
| 9 | (Belgium) Loris Brogno | Mons | 9 |
| 12 | (Belgium) Axel Lauwrensens | Tubize-Braine | 8 |
| 12 | (Belgium) Simon Paulet | Olympic Charleroi | 8 |
| 14 | (Belgium) Mohamed Asri | Union SG B | 7 |
| 14 | (Ghana) Raymond Asante | Zébra Élites | 7 |
| 14 | (Belgium) Yann Gboua | SL16 FC | 7 |

6 goals (6 players)
- (Democratic Republic of the Congo) Leslie Bamona Lubelu (Mons)
- (Belgium) Mathieu Cornet (Rochefort)
- (Belgium) Curtis Kabeya (Union Namur)
5 goals (7 players)
- (Belgium) Simon Franquin (Binche)
- (Senegal) Thierno Gaye (Olympic Charleroi)
- (Belgium) Jesse Mputu (Olympic Charleroi)
- (Belgium) Jonathan Hendrickx (Tubize-Braine)
- (Belgium) Maxime Migliore (Tubize-Braine)
- (France) Martins Toutou (Tubize-Braine)
4 goals (13 players)
- (France) Jérémy Kumbi (Mons)
- (Tunisia) Mohamed Medfai (Olympic Charleroi)
- (Belgium) Grégory Perseo (Rochefort)
- (Belgium) Tom Panepinto (Stockay)
- (Belgium) Alessio Sternon (Stockay)
- (Belgium) Adel Sbaa (Union Namur)
- (Belgium) Mayron de Almeida (Virton)
- (Comoros) Ibtoihi Hadari (Virton)
- (France) Liamine Mokdad (Virton)
- (France) Eric N'Jo (Virton)
- (Guinea) Florentin Pogba (Virton)
- (Belgium) Ahmed Mulumba (Zébra Élites)
3 goals (11 players)
- (Albania) Drin Sula (Mons)
- (Belgium) Lucas Walbrecq (Mons)
- (France) Melvin Renquin (Rochefort)
- (France) Guillaume Robail (Rochefort)
- (France) Mahamadou Diawara (SL16 FC)
- (France) Edoly Lukoki (SL16 FC)
- (Belgium) Malory Destrain (Tournai)
- (France) Sasha Henry (Tournai)
- (Belgium) Serhat Tepe (Tubize-Braine)
- (Senegal) Ibrahima Mbaye (Virton)
- (Belgium) Quentin Benaets (Zébra Élites)
2 goals (30 players)
- (Belgium) Nabil Hassaïni (Binche)
- (Belgium) Gabriel Lemoine (Binche)
- (Belgium) Arnaud Mukota (Binche)
- (Belgium) Johan Sampaoli (Binche)
- (France) Axel Benoît (Mons)
- (Belgium) Louka Franco (Mons)
- (Belgium) Geoffrey Ghesquière (Olympic Charleroi)
- (Algeria) Mehdi Terki (Olympic Charleroi)
- (Algeria) Toufik Zeghdane (Olympic Charleroi)
- (Belgium) Rabby Mateta Pepa (SL16 FC)
- (Belgium) Jordan Kerstenne (Stockay)
- (Belgium) Sam Sylla (Stockay)
- (Belgium) Alessio Caufriez (Tournai)
- (Belgium) Gianni Cordaro (Tournai)
- (Belgium) Cheick Holuigue (Tournai)
- (Belgium) Quentin Pieraert (Tournai)
- (Belgium) Oleg Kuchinska (Tubize-Braine)
- (Croatia) Lorenzo Prso (Tubize-Braine)
- (Democratic Republic of the Congo) Emmanuel Salazaku (Tubize-Braine)
- (Belgium) Visar Shala (Tubize-Braine)
- (France) Zacharie Iscaye (Union Namur)
- (Belgium) Soulaimane Berradi (Union SG B)
- (Belgium) Yari Stevens (Union SG B)
- (France) Gaëtan Arib (Virton)
- (France) Kélil Benkahlouche (Virton)
- (France) Iliasse Errahmouni (Virton)
- (Belgium) Valentin Guillaume (Virton)
- (Ghana) Raymond Asante (Zébra Élites)
- (Belgium) Nathan Okumu (Zébra Élites)
- (France) Massamba Sow (Zébra Élites)
1 goal (47 players)
- (Belgium) Grégory Grisez (Binche)
- (Belgium) Quentin Louagé (Binche)
- (France) Teddy Chevalier (Mons)
- (Belgium) Jordan Dauchy (Mons)
- (Cameroon) Karl Ndedi (Olympic Charleroi)
- (Belgium) Pierre-Alain Laloux (Rochefort)
- (Belgium) Andel Sarr (Rochefort)
- (Colombia) Carlos Uhía (Rochefort)
- (Belgium) Benjamin Van Den Ackerveken (Rochefort)
- (Belgium) Marten Wilmots (Rochefort)
- (Germany) Faroukou Cissé (SL16 FC)
- (France) Mathis Hannedouche (SL16 FC)
- (Belgium) Kilian Lokembo Lokaso (SL16 FC)
- (Belgium) Afonso N'Salambi (SL16 FC)
- (Belgium) Oscar Olivier (SL16 FC)
- (Belgium) Thiago Paulo da Silva (SL16 FC)
- (Belgium) Noah Sy (SL16 FC)
- (Netherlands) Junior van Beveren (SL16 FC)
- (Belgium) Miguel Dachelet (Stockay)
- (France) Isaac Kambuania (Stockay)
- (Belgium) Valentin Dassonville (Tournai)
- (Gabon) Gaëtan Missi Mezu (Tournai)
- (France) Lemuel Ntalu (Tournai)
- (Belgium) David Perreira-Bofomua (Tournai)
- (Morocco) Karim Essikal (Tubize-Braine)
- (Belgium) Shean Garlito (Tubize-Braine)
- (Belgium) Kylian Hazard (Tubize-Braine)
- (Democratic Republic of the Congo) Emmanuel Salazaku (Tubize-Braine)
- (Belgium) El Mehdi Khaida (Union Namur)
- (Belgium) Luca Napoleone (Union Namur)
- (France) Junior Nzila (Union Namur)
- (Belgium) Mohamed Asaidi (Union SG B)
- (Belgium) Mateo Delph Rivera (Union SG B)
- (Belgium) Sada Diallo (Union SG B)
- (Madagascar) Loïc Lapoussin (Union SG B)
- (Belgium) Maxime Guillaume (Virton)
- (France) Bilel Hassaini (Virton)
- (France) Anyss Larbes (Virton)
- (Belgium) Yanis Mbombo (Virton)
- (Belgium) Jorn Vancamp (Virton)
- (Morocco) Amine Boukamir (Zébra Élites)
- (France) José Capon (Zébra Élites)
- (Belgium) Jason Dalle Molle (Zébra Élites)
- (Belgium) Yoan Djongambo (Zébra Élites)
- (Belgium) Noam Mayoka-Tika (Zébra Élites)
- (Belgium) Alexandre Stanic (Zébra Élites)
- (Serbia) Nikola Štulić (Zébra Élites)
2 own goals (1 player)
- (Belgium) Mohamed Asaidi (Union SG B, scored for Union Namur and Virton)
1 own goal (6 players)
- (Belgium) Jesse Mputu (Olympic Charleroi, scored for Tubize-Braine)
- (Cameroon) Karl Ndedi (Olympic Charleroi, scored for Union SG B)
- (Belgium) Giulian Teise (Stockay, scored for Olympic Charleroi)
- (Belgium) Tom Panepinto (Tubize-Braine, scored for Stockay)
- (Belgium) Jérémie Mugabo (Union Namur, scored for Virton)
- (Guinea) Florentin Pogba (Virton, scored for Tubize-Braine)
