= 2022–23 Belgian Division 2 =

Belgian Division 2
- Season: 2022–23
- Dates: 3 September 2022 – 14 May 2023
- Champions: Lokeren-Temse; Cappellen; Warnant
- Promoted: Lokeren-Temse; Cappellen; Namur
- Relegated: Westhoek; Erpe-Mere United; Pepingen-Halle; Beerschot U23; Turnhout; Solières Sport; Seraing II; Waremme

The 2022–23 Belgian Division 2 is the seventh season of the division in its current format, placed at the fourth-tier of football in Belgium.

With respect to the previous season, the most important change is the inclusion of U23 teams, with all three divisions seeing two teams enter and increase the size from 16 to 18 teams as a result. As before, leagues VV A and VV B consist of teams with a license from the Voetbalfederatie Vlaanderen (VV, the Flemish/Dutch speaking wing of the Belgian FA), while the ACFF league contains teams with a license from the Association des Clubs Francophones de Football (ACFF, the French-speaking wing of the RBFA). The champions from each of the three leagues will be promoted to the 2023–24 Belgian National Division 1.

== Team changes ==
=== In ===
- Promoted from the 2021–22 Belgian Division 3 were champions Oostkamp (VV A), Racing Mechelen (VV B), Union Namur (ACFF A) and Dison (ACFF B).
- Six teams also gained promotion following wins in the promotion play-offs: Lebbeke, Torhout, Erpe-Mere United, Lille, Turnhout and Binche.
- Only one team was relegated from the 2021–22 Belgian National Division 1: La Louvière Centre.
- Six U23 teams were added to the league:
  - Cercle Brugge and Zulte Waregem entered division VV A under the names of Jong Cercle and Jong Essevee.
  - Beerschot and KV Mechelen started in division VV B as Beerschot U23 and Jong KV Mechelen.
  - The ACFF division was completed with the U23 teams of Seraing and Union SG as respectively RFC Seraing U23 and Union SG B.

=== Out ===
- Previous seasons' champions Hoogstraten (VV B) and RAAL La Louvière (ACFF) were promoted, as well as VV A division runners-up Ninove (who took the place of Sparta Petegem which did not apply for a licence, necessary to get promoted).
- Relegated based on their finishing positions last season were Houtvenne and Wijgmaal from division VV B and Couvin-Mariembourg, Givry and Durbuy from the ACFF division.
- In division VV A, Zwevezele and Menen dropped down voluntarily to restart at lower levels, while Ronse folded as a team entirely with its matricule number scrapped, although de facto it merged into another team.

== Belgian Division 2 VV A ==
Locations of the 2022–23 Belgian Division 2 VV A teams

=== League table ===
Pos	Team	Pld	W	D	L	GF	GA	GD	Pts	Qualification or relegation
1	Lokeren-Temse (C, P)	34	22	7	5	66	35	+31	73	Promotion to the 2023–24 Belgian National Division 1
2	Petegem	34	17	8	9	68	55	+13	59	Qualification for the Promotion play-offs VV
3	Oostkamp	34	16	10	8	77	51	+26	58	Qualification for the Promotion play-offs VV
4	Jong Cercle	34	16	7	11	54	43	+11	55	Qualification for the Promotion play-offs VV
5	Racing Gent	34	15	8	11	63	51	+12	53	
6	Merelbeke	34	14	11	9	47	36	+11	53	
7	Aalst	34	15	6	13	55	44	+11	51	Qualification for the Promotion play-offs VV
8	Jong Essevee	34	14	8	12	64	49	+15	50	
9	Dikkelvenne	34	14	8	12	53	55	−2	50	
10	Oudenaarde	34	13	10	11	60	64	−4	49	
11	Zelzate	34	13	6	15	53	55	−2	45	
12	Torhout	34	12	8	14	57	46	+11	44	
13	Olsa Brakel	34	12	8	14	49	54	−5	44	
14	Harelbeke	34	11	8	15	46	60	−14	41	
15	Gullegem	34	10	11	13	57	53	+4	41	
16	Wetteren (O)	34	9	8	17	41	67	−26	35	Qualification for the Relegation play-offs
17	Westhoek (R)	34	8	11	15	44	66	−22	35	Relegation to the 2023–24 Belgian Division 3
18	Erpe-Mere (R)	34	2	3	29	23	93	−70	9	Relegation to the 2023–24 Belgian Division 3

Source: vbal4
Rules for classification: 1) Points; 2) Matches won; 3) Goal difference; 4) Goals scored; 5) Away matches won; 6) Goal difference in away matches; 7) Away goals scored.
(C) Champions; (O) Play-off winners; (P) Promoted; (R) Relegated

== Belgian Division 2 VV B ==
Locations of the 2022–23 Belgian Division 2 VV B teams

=== League table ===
Pos	Team	Pld	W	D	L	GF	GA	GD	Pts	Qualification or relegation
1	Cappellen (C, P)	34	20	6	8	61	37	+24	66	Promotion to the 2023–24 Belgian National Division 1
2	Hades	34	18	8	8	51	32	+19	62	Qualification for the Promotion play-offs VV
3	Hasselt	34	17	7	10	52	42	+10	58	Qualification for the Promotion play-offs VV
4	Belisia	34	17	5	12	55	37	+18	56	Qualification for the Promotion play-offs VV
5	Tongeren	34	17	5	12	61	56	+5	56	
6	Lyra-Lierse Berlaar	34	16	7	11	64	45	+19	55	
7	Jong KV Mechelen	34	15	9	10	60	48	+12	54	
8	Diegem	34	14	10	10	56	51	+5	52	
9	Bocholt	34	14	7	13	54	46	+8	49	
10	Racing Mechelen	34	12	11	11	45	36	+9	47	
11	Lille	34	13	7	14	55	59	−4	46	
12	City Pirates	34	12	8	14	56	75	−19	44	Qualification for the Promotion play-offs VV
13	Londerzeel	34	10	11	13	51	48	+3	41	
14	Berchem	34	10	8	16	45	61	−16	38	
15	Lebbeke	34	10	8	16	47	64	−17	38	
16	Turnhout (R)	34	10	4	20	68	81	−13	34	Qualification for the Relegation play-offs
17	Pepingen-Halle (R)	34	7	7	20	36	66	−30	28	Relegation to the 2023–24 Belgian Division 3
18	Beerschot U23 (R)	34	7	6	21	40	73	−33	27	Relegation to the 2023–24 Belgian Division 3

Source: vbal4
Rules for classification: 1) Points; 2) Matches won; 3) Goal difference; 4) Goals scored; 5) Away matches won; 6) Goal difference in away matches; 7) Away goals scored.
(C) Champions; (P) Promoted; (R) Relegated

== Belgian Division 2 ACFF ==
Locations of the 2022–23 Belgian Division 2 ACFF teams

=== League table ===
Pos	Team	Pld	W	D	L	GF	GA	GD	Pts	Qualification or relegation
1	Warnant (Note: Warnant did not apply for a license to be eligible for the Belgian National Division 1 and hence was not eligible for promotion.) (C)	34	22	6	6	58	31	+27	72	
2	Union Namur (P)	34	19	5	10	75	53	+22	62	Promotion to the 2023–24 Belgian National Division 1
3	Tubize-Braine	34	18	7	9	70	33	+37	61	Qualification for the Promotion play-offs ACFF
4	La Louvière Centre	34	18	5	11	62	46	+16	56 (Note: La Louvière Centre was deducted 3 points for not obtaining a valid license during the previous season.)	Qualification for the Promotion play-offs ACFF
5	Meux	34	16	8	10	51	46	+5	56	Qualification for the Promotion play-offs ACFF
6	Binche	34	15	10	9	54	43	+11	55	Qualification for the Promotion play-offs ACFF
7	Rebecq	34	16	5	13	61	54	+7	53	
8	Stockay	34	15	8	11	45	41	+4	53	
9	Verlaine	34	15	6	13	55	41	+14	51	
10	Dison	34	13	11	10	45	44	+1	50	
11	Hamoir	34	12	9	13	47	64	−17	45	
12	Acren-Lessines	34	14	2	18	54	66	−12	44	
13	Ganshoren	34	11	11	12	47	47	0	44	
14	Union SG B	34	10	8	16	53	53	0	38	
15	Jette	34	9	8	17	45	56	−11	35	
16	Solières (R)	34	8	7	19	54	77	−23	31	Relegation to the 2023–24 Belgian Division 3
17	RFC Seraing U23 (R)	34	6	6	22	39	76	−37	24	Relegation to the 2023–24 Belgian Division 3
18	Waremme (R)	34	3	10	21	30	74	−44	19	Relegation to the 2023–24 Belgian Division 3

Updated to match(es) played on completed. Source: vbal4
Rules for classification: 1) Points; 2) Matches won; 3) Goal difference; 4) Goals scored; 5) Away matches won; 6) Goal difference in away matches; 7) Away goals scored.
(C) Champions; (P) Promoted; (R) Relegated

== Championship match ==
With two divisions on VV side, the two divisional champions decided to play a championship match to determine the overall VV Division 2 champion.

=== Championship match VV ===
18 May 2023
15:00

Lokeren-Temse	0–1	Cappellen
	report	Diawara 7'

Referee: Ermaild Mataj

Cappellen was awarded the symbolic title of Belgian Division 2 VV champion.

== Promotion play-offs ==
=== Promotion play-offs VV ===
The teams finishing in second place in the Belgian Division 2 VV A and Belgian Division 2 VV B take part in a promotion playoff first round together with three period winners from these both divisions. These 8 teams from the VV play the first round of a promotion playoff, with two teams qualifying for the Promotion play-offs Final.

In division A, Eendracht Aalst won the first period and was joined by the teams in positions 2 through 4: Petegem, Oostkamp and Jong Cercle, as the other two periods were won by champions Lokeren-Temse. In division B, Hades (2nd), Hasselt (3rd), and City Pirates (12th) each were able to win a period and thereby qualified. They were joined by the highest finisher not already qualified: Belisia Bilzen (4th). Of these eight teams, only Belisia Bilzen, Eendracht Aalst, Hasselt and Jong Cercle are eligible for promotion and can qualify for the Promotion play-offs Final.

==== VV Round 1 ====
18 May 2023
15:00

City Pirates	0–4	Jong Cercle
	report	Wilke 2', 17' (pen.), 18'; Ackx 29'

18 May 2023
15:00

Petegem	0–2	Hasselt
	report	Maus 53' (pen.); Cuypers 64'

18 May 2023
15:00

Belisia Bilzen	2–0	Oostkamp
Wijnen 37'; Quadflieg 60'	report

18 May 2023
15:00

Eendracht Aalst	0–0 (a.e.t.)	Hades
	report
Penalties
Van Den Eynde (penalty scored); De Coninck (penalty missed); Panneel (penalty scored); Mbaye (penalty scored)	3–5	(penalty scored) Bongiorno; (penalty scored) Cinti; (penalty scored) Jacquemyn; (penalty scored) Caubergs; (penalty scored) Gueroui

Jong Cercle, Hasselt, Belisia Bilsen, and Hades qualified for the VV second-round promotion play-offs. As more than two of the eligible teams qualified, VV Round 2 was necessary.

==== VV Round 2 ====
21 May 2023
15:00

Belisia Bilzen	0–1	Jong Cercle
	report	El Bahri 88'

21 May 2023
15:00

Hasselt	5–0	Hades
Cuypers 9', 87'; Kessels 52'; Huygen 54'; Vandergeeten 58'	report

Hasselt and Jong Cercle qualified for the promotion play-offs Final and were both eligible, hence the third round match between Belisia Bilzen and Hades was not played as there was nothing more at stake.

=== Promotion play-offs ACFF ===
With champions Warnant ineligible for promotion, second-placed Union Namur was directly promoted instead. As no teams outside the top six won a period title, the teams in positions 3 through 6 participated in the playoffs. Prior to the start of these play-offs however, both Meux and Binche were already ineligible for promotion as they had not applied for a license for the level above.

==== ACFF Round 1 ====
18 May 2023
15:00

La Louvière Centre	3–0	Meux
Luhaka 14'; Ba 16'; Lubaki-Evra 40'	report

18 May 2023
15:00

Tubize-Braine	0–0 (a.e.t.)	Binche
	report
Penalties
Leite (penalty scored); Lkoutbi (penalty missed); Migliore (penalty scored); Velasco Plaza (penalty scored); El Omari (penalty scored); Van Onsem (penalty scored); Tepe (penalty scored); Taroli (penalty scored); Aarab (penalty missed)	7–8	(penalty scored) Scohy; (penalty scored) Seggour; (penalty scored) George; (penalty scored) Louagé; (penalty missed) Despontin; (penalty scored) Frisanco; (penalty scored) Franquin; (penalty scored) Brichant; (penalty scored) Fisichella

La Louvière Centre and Binche qualified for ACFF Round 2. Binche was however ineligible for promotion and hence La Louvière Centre was already certain of participating in the Promotion play-offs Final irrespective of the result.

==== ACFF Round 2 ====
21 May 2023
15:00

Binche	1–2	La Louvière Centre
Seggour 68'	report	Jatta 25'; Lubaki-Evra 57'

=== Promotion play-offs Final ===
The two winners of the Promotion play-offs on the VV side (Jong Cercle and Hasselt) and La Louvière Centre, the only team with a valid license taking part in the ACFF Promotion play-offs played a final tournament together with the team that finished in 14th place in the 2022–23 Belgian National Division 1 (Young Reds Antwerp). The winner of this play-off promotes to (or remains in) the 2023–24 Belgian National Division 1. As Young Reds Antwerp is a team from the VV side, there will be an extra VV team relegating from the 2022–23 Belgian Division 2 (and all levels below) in case the team from the ACFF side (La Louvière Centre) gets promoted. In this division, this meant that R.F.C. Wetteren, the winner of the Relegation play-offs, had to hope La Louvière Centre would not win the Promotion play-offs Final.

==== Final Round 1 ====
27 May 2023
20:00

La Louvière Centre	0–2	Young Reds Antwerp
	report	Shala 73' (pen.); Aziz 90+2'

28 May 2023
15:00

Hasselt	1–4	Jong Cercle
Maus 62'	report	Wilke 28'; Lucker 44'; Ackx 56'; Aziz 87'

La Louvière Centre and Hasselt were eliminated and remain in the Belgian Division 2. Due to the non-promotion of La Louvière Centre, both the outgoing and incoming team will be of the same (Flemish) side of the football pyramid, and hence there will be no extra promotions on ACFF side, nor extra relegations on VV side. On VV side in particular, the following teams were spared of relegation due to the loss of La Louvière Centre: Wetteren (Division 2), Witgoor (Division 3), Ranst (1st Provincial Division Antwerp), Willebroek (2nd Provincial Division Antwerp) and Berendrecht (3rd Provincial Division Antwerp).

==== Final Round 2 ====
3 June 2023
14:30

Young Reds Antwerp	1–0	Jong Cercle
Shala 84'	report

Berlaar
Referee: Tim De Keyzer

As Young Reds Antwerp won the match, both clubs remained in their division. Young Reds Antwerp will play in the Belgian National Division 1, while Jong Cercle will play in the Belgian Division 2.

== Relegation play-off ==
At this level of the football pyramid, there is only a relegation playoff on the VV side, with the two teams finishing 14th playing each other.

18 May 2023
15:00

Wetteren	3–0	Turnhout
De Caigny 7' (pen.); Vandekerckhove 24'; Mitu 44'	report

Prior to the match, it was known that the loser of this VV play-off would be relegated, while the winner would need to await the results of higher divisions. Turnhout was thus relegated while Wetteren was unsure. On 27 May 2023, following the loss of La Louvière Centre in the Promotion play-offs Final of the 2022–23 Belgian Division 2, there would be no extra relegations on VV side and hence Wetteren was spared of relegation.

== Number of teams by provinces ==
Number of teams	Province or region	Team(s) in VV A	Team(s) in VV B	Team(s) in ACFF
12	East Flanders	Aalst, Brakel, Dikkelvenne, Erpe-Mere, RC Gent, Lokeren-Temse, Merelbeke, Oudenaarde, Petegem, Wetteren and Zelzate	Lebbeke	–
9	Antwerp	none	Beerschot U23, Berchem, Cappellen, City Pirates, Jong KV Mechelen, Lille, Lyra-Lierse, Racing Mechelen and Turnhout	–
8	Liège	–	–	Dison, Hamoir, RFC Seraing U23, Solières, Stockay, Verlaine, Waremme and Warnant
7	West Flanders	Gullegem, Harelbeke, Jong Cercle, Jong Essevee, Oostkamp, Torhout and Westhoek	none	–
5	Limburg	none	Belisia, Bocholt, Hades, Hasselt, Heur-Tongeren	–
3	Brussels	none	none	Ganshoren, Jette and Union SG B
3	Hainaut	–	–	Acren Lessines, Binche and La Louvière
3	Flemish Brabant	none	Diegem, Londerzeel and Pepingen-Halle	–
2	Namur	–	–	Meux and Namur
2	Walloon Brabant	–	–	Rebecq and Tubize-Braine
