= 2018–19 Belgian Third Amateur Division =

Belgian Third Amateur Division
- Season: 2018–19

The 2018–19 Belgian Third Amateur Division is the third season of the division in its current format, replacing the former Belgian Fourth Division.

== Team changes ==
=== In ===
- Bornem, La Calamine, Pepingen-Halle, Sint-Lenaarts, Sprimont Comblain, Tienen, Torhout and Zwarte Leeuw were all relegated from the 2017–18 Belgian Second Amateur Division.
- Lyra-Lierse Berlaar, Helson Helchteren, Zelzate and Zwevezele were promoted as champions of the Flemish Belgian Provincial Leagues, respectively in Antwerp, Limburg, East Flanders and West Flanders.
- Ostiches-Ath, Warnant, Meix-Dt-Virton and Fosses were promoted as champions of the Walloon Belgian Provincial Leagues, respectively in Hainaut, Liège, Luxembourg and Namur.
- CS Braine was promoted as champion of the French speaking teams in the region matching the old Province of Brabant and Brussels.
- Betekom was promoted as champion of the Flemish speaking teams in the region matching the old Province of Brabant and Brussels.
- Racing Mechelen and Oostkamp were promoted through the interprovincial play-offs on VFV side.
- Condruzien, Jette and Symphorinois were promoted through the interprovincial play-offs on ACFF side.
- As top team not yet promoted in Luxembourg, Oppagne-Wéris was awarded a promotion to fill the gap left by Bertrix.
- As top French speaking team not yet promoted in the old Province of Brabant and Brussels, Stockel was awarded a promotion to fill the gap left by WS Brussels, who folded after being relegated from the 2017–18 Belgian Second Amateur Division.

=== Out ===
- Menen was promoted after winning the 2017–18 Belgian Third Amateur Division A.
- Heur-Tongeren was promoted after winning the 2017–18 Belgian Third Amateur Division B.
- La Louvière was promoted after winning the 2017–18 Belgian Third Amateur Division C.
- Tilleur was promoted after winning the 2017–18 Belgian Third Amateur Division D.
- Diegem, Dikkelvenne and Eppegem were promoted as winners of the Third Amateur Division promotion play-offs VFV.
- Couvin-Mariembourg, Francs Borains and Visé were promoted as winners of the Third Amateur Division promotion play-offs ACFF.
- Cointe-Liège, Diest, Grimbergen, Habay, Herentals, Hoeilaart, Mariekerke, Ninove, Solre, Spy, Sterrebeek, Vlamertinge and Waterloo were relegated to the Belgian Provincial Leagues.
- Bertrix decided to restart at the bottom level of the Belgian football pyramid due to financial trouble.

=== Merger ===
- UR Namur would normally have been relegated from the 2017–18 Belgian Third Amateur Division but merged with newly promoted Fosses to form Union Namur Fosses-La-Ville.
- Royal Sprimont Comblain Sport merged with Royal Football Club Banneux to form Royal Football Comblain Banneux Sprimont.

=== Name change ===
- Racing Jet Wavre changed its name to Wavre Sports.

== Belgian Third Amateur Division A ==
Locations of the 2018–19 Belgian Third Amateur Division A teams

=== League table ===
Pos	Team	Pld	W	D	L	GF	GA	GD	Pts	Qualification or relegation
1	Merelbeke (C, P)	30	17	8	5	49	25	+24	59	Promotion to the 2019–20 Belgian Second Amateur Division
2	Wetteren	30	17	6	7	60	36	+24	57	Qualification to Promotion play-offs VFV
3	Zwevezele (P)	30	16	7	7	63	35	+28	55	Qualification to Promotion play-offs VFV
4	Pepingen-Halle (P)	30	14	9	7	49	30	+19	51	Qualification to Promotion play-offs VFV
5	Wingene	30	13	10	7	42	32	+10	49	Qualification to Promotion play-offs VFV
6	Stekene	30	14	5	11	38	37	+1	47	
7	Zelzate	30	13	8	9	49	37	+12	47	
8	Lebbeke	30	12	8	10	41	40	+1	44	
9	Melsele	30	11	8	11	32	36	−4	41	
10	Lede	30	9	11	10	36	38	−2	38	
11	Wolvertem Merchtem	30	10	5	15	35	45	−10	35	
12	Torhout	30	9	7	14	50	56	−6	34	
13	Oostkamp (R)	30	9	4	17	55	62	−7	31	Qualification to Relegation play-offs VFV
14	Wervik (R)	30	8	6	16	30	56	−26	30	Relegation to the 2019–20 Belgian Provincial Leagues
15	Kampenhout (R)	30	6	7	17	30	48	−18	25	Relegation to the 2019–20 Belgian Provincial Leagues
16	Woluwe-Zaventem (R)	30	7	1	22	41	87	−46	22	Relegation to the 2019–20 Belgian Provincial Leagues

Updated to match(es) played on 14 March 2019. Source: https://www.vbal4.be/p010241.htm
(C) Champions; (P) Promoted; (R) Relegated

== Belgian Third Amateur Division B ==
Locations of the 2018–19 Belgian Third Amateur Division B teams

=== League table ===
Pos	Team	Pld	W	D	L	GF	GA	GD	Pts	Qualification or relegation
1	Tienen (C, P)	30	20	5	5	57	27	+30	65	Promotion to the 2019–20 Belgian Second Amateur Division
2	Houtvenne	30	15	8	7	54	37	+17	53	Qualification to Promotion play-offs VFV
3	Lyra-Lierse Berlaar	30	14	10	6	48	32	+16	52	Qualification to Promotion play-offs VFV
4	Sint-Lenaarts	30	13	7	10	58	46	+12	46	Qualification to Promotion play-offs VFV
5	Betekom	30	13	6	11	52	50	+2	45	Qualification to Promotion play-offs VFV
6	Zwarte Leeuw	30	11	10	9	50	48	+2	43	
7	Termien	30	11	10	9	45	45	0	43	
8	Wellen	30	11	9	10	45	42	+3	42	
9	Helson Helchteren	30	11	7	12	47	54	−7	40	
10	Esperanza Pelt	30	11	4	15	37	52	−15	37	
11	Bornem	30	9	10	11	40	36	+4	37	
12	Bilzen	30	8	11	11	53	58	−5	35	
13	Ternesse (R)	30	9	6	15	38	52	−14	33	Qualification to Relegation play-offs VFV
14	Nijlen (R)	30	8	7	15	36	50	−14	31	Relegation to the 2019–20 Belgian Provincial Leagues
15	Leopoldsburg (R)	30	8	6	16	35	56	−21	30	Relegation to the 2019–20 Belgian Provincial Leagues
16	KRC Mechelen (R)	30	7	6	17	36	46	−10	27	Relegation to the 2019–20 Belgian Provincial Leagues

Updated to match(es) played on 11 March 2019. Source: https://www.vbal4.be/p010242.htm
(C) Champions; (P) Promoted; (R) Relegated

== Belgian Third Amateur Division C ==
Locations of the 2018–19 Belgian Third Amateur Division C teams

=== League table ===
Pos	Team	Pld	W	D	L	GF	GA	GD	Pts	Qualification or relegation
1	Namur Fosses (C, P)	30	18	6	6	68	29	+39	60	Promotion to the 2019–20 Belgian Second Amateur Division
2	CS Braine	30	17	9	4	58	47	+11	60	Qualification to Promotion play-offs ACFF
3	Aische	30	16	6	8	59	47	+12	54	Qualification to Promotion play-offs ACFF
4	Tournai	30	14	10	6	46	25	+21	52	Qualification to Promotion play-offs ACFF
5	Léopold Uccle	30	14	6	10	53	36	+17	48	Qualification to Promotion play-offs ACFF
6	Ostiches-Ath	30	14	5	11	55	47	+8	47	
7	Manageoise	30	13	8	9	50	38	+12	47	
8	Quévy-Mons	30	13	5	12	45	45	0	44	
9	Symphorinois	30	11	10	9	50	50	0	43	
10	Stade Brainois	30	11	6	13	37	36	+1	39	
11	Jette	30	9	7	14	48	56	−8	34	
12	Wavre Sports	30	9	5	16	42	63	−21	32	
13	Ganshoren	30	7	10	13	44	61	−17	31	Qualification to Relegation play-offs ACFF
14	Tamines (R)	30	7	8	15	45	65	−20	29	Relegation to the 2019–20 Belgian Provincial Leagues
15	Stockel (R)	30	6	5	19	38	69	−31	23	Relegation to the 2019–20 Belgian Provincial Leagues
16	Binche (R)	30	4	8	18	33	73	−40	20	Relegation to the 2019–20 Belgian Provincial Leagues

Source: https://www.vbal4.be/p020241.htm
(C) Champions; (P) Promoted; (R) Relegated

== Belgian Third Amateur Division D ==
Locations of the 2018–19 Belgian Third Amateur Division D teams

=== League table ===
Pos	Team	Pld	W	D	L	GF	GA	GD	Pts	Qualification or relegation
1	Stockay (C, P)	30	21	5	4	75	36	+39	68	Promotion to the 2019–20 Belgian Second Amateur Division
2	Givry (P)	30	20	5	5	59	31	+28	65	Qualification to Promotion play-offs ACFF
3	Richelle	30	18	9	3	61	23	+38	63	Qualification to Promotion play-offs ACFF
4	Verlaine (P)	30	16	7	7	52	35	+17	55	Qualification to Promotion play-offs ACFF
5	Onhaye (P)	30	13	10	7	64	47	+17	49	Qualification to Promotion play-offs ACFF
6	Warnant	30	14	6	10	54	40	+14	48	
7	Aywaille	30	12	9	9	48	41	+7	45	
8	Meix-devant-Virton	30	12	7	11	46	43	+3	43	
9	Sprimont	30	12	6	12	53	51	+2	42	
10	Herstal	30	12	6	12	56	61	−5	42	
11	Mormont	30	9	10	11	48	56	−8	37	
12	Huy	30	8	9	13	46	59	−13	33	
13	Oppagne-Wéris	30	8	7	15	46	63	−17	31	Qualification to Relegation play-offs ACFF
14	Longlier (R)	30	5	2	23	40	79	−39	17	Relegation to the 2019–20 Belgian Provincial Leagues
15	Union La Calamine (R)	30	3	6	21	30	61	−31	15	Relegation to the 2019–20 Belgian Provincial Leagues
16	Condruzien (R)	30	3	4	23	26	78	−52	13	Relegation to the 2019–20 Belgian Provincial Leagues

Source: https://www.vbal4.be/p020242z9.htm
(C) Champions; (P) Promoted; (R) Relegated

== Championship matches ==
Both the two VFV and two ACFF teams winning their leagues can arrange a title match to determine the overall VFV and ACFF champions of the Belgian Third Division. This season, the overall ACFF champion was supposed to be determined over two legs, however Namur forfeited the return match after losing the first leg. On VFV side, Merelbeke and Tienen decided not to play a championship match. There was also no match between the overall VFV and ACFF champions.

=== Championship match ACFF ===
==== First leg ====
4 May 2019

Namur Fosses	1–4	Stockay
Rosmolen 42'	report	M. Lambert 13', 74', 83'; Saglam 90+1' (pen.)

==== Second leg ====
11 May 2019
20:00

Stockay	5–0 FF	Namur Fosses

Namur did not show up for the return match and lost 1-9 on aggregate. Stockay was crowned overall ACFF champion in the Belgian Third Amateur Division.

== Promotion play-offs ==
=== Promotion play-offs VFV ===
The teams finishing in second place in the Third Amateur Division A and Third Amateur Division B will take part in a promotion playoff first round together with three period winners from both divisions. These 8 teams from the VFV will play the first round of a promotion-playoff, with two teams promoting to the 2019–20 Belgian Second Amateur Division. Depending on the number of VFV teams relegating from the 2018–19 Belgian First Amateur Division and possible mergers and bankruptcies, more teams might get promoted.

In Division A, Wetteren (2nd place overall) and Zwevezele (won two periods) qualified directly, while Pepingen-Halle and Wingene were awarded a place based on their league finish. In a similar fashion in Division B, Houtvenne (2nd place overall) and Lyra-Lierse (won one period) were joined by Sint-Lenaarts and Betekom.

==== VFV Round 1 ====
11 May 2019
19:30

Houtvenne	1–0	Wingene

12 May 2019
15:00

Pepingen-Halle	0–0 (a.e.t.)	Wetteren
Penalties
	3–0

12 May 2019
15:00

Zwevezele	3–0	Sint-Lenaarts

12 May 2019
15:00

Lyra-Lierse	1–0	Betekom

The four winners will continue into the VFV Round 2 to play for the two extra promotion places.

==== VFV Round 2 ====
19 May 2019
15:00

Pepingen-Halle	3–1	Houtvenne

19 May 2019
15:00

Zwevezele	2–0	Lyra-Lierse

Pepingen-Halle and Zwevezele are promoted to the 2019–20 Belgian Second Amateur Division. Lyra-Lierse and Houtvenne moved to the third place match in case extra promotion places become available.

==== Third place match ====
25 May 2019
20:00

Lyra-Lierse	1–2	Houtvenne
Flebus		Van Asten; Naqqadi

By winning, Houtvenne is first in line to promote in case an extra spot opens up.

=== Promotion play-offs ACFF ===
The team finishing in second place in the Third Amateur Division C and Third Amateur Division D will take part in a promotion playoff first round together with three period winners from both divisions. These 8 teams from the ACFF will play the first round of a promotion-playoff, with two teams promoting to the 2019–20 Belgian Second Amateur Division although more places could come up which is why the third round also features a match between the losers of the second round.

In Division C, CS Braine won two periods with the other being won by champion Namur Fosses. The three remaining spots were taken by third, fourth and fifth placed teams, respectively Aische, Tournai and Léopold Uccle. In Division D, Givry and Verlaine had each managed to win a period. Richelle and Onhaye also qualified as the two highest finishers.

==== ACFF Round 1 ====
4 May 2019
20:00

Léopold Uccle	1–3	Onhaye
Sow 6'	report	Granville 45+2'; Th. Delplank 52'; Lambert 90+2'

5 May 2019
15:00

Givry	5–1	Aische
Tchamdjou 34'; Hinck 48', 78'; Sylla 53'; Rémy 90'	Report	Marrazza 63'

5 May 2019
15:00

Richelle	~~2–1~~	Tournai
Busarello 78' (pen.); Weber 90'	report	Salmi 76'

12 May 2019
15:00
replay

Richelle	1–3	Tournai
Renauld (red card) 30'; Niro 50'; Deghaye (red card) 72'; Marly (red card) 90'	report	El Ghandor 3'; Ndiaye 45'; Hassan 90+2' (pen.)

5 May 2019
15:00

Verlaine	2–1	CS Braine
Guillaume 81', 87'	report	Bilstein 90+2'

The four winners moved on to round 2 to contend for promotion, while the losing teams remain in the Belgian Third Amateur Division.

==== ACFF Round 2 ====
The two winning teams will be promoted to the 2019–20 Belgian Second Amateur Division, the losing teams will play a match to determine third and fourth place in case extra promotion places would come up.

12 May 2019
15:00

Givry	1–2	Verlaine
Schinckus 72' (pen.)		Collée 61' (pen.), 88' (pen.)

18 May 2019
20:30

Tournai	0–2	Onhaye
		Lambert 37', 90+2'

Verlaine and Onhaye won promotion to the 2019–20 Belgian Second Amateur Division. A third team will be promoted in case Visé, playing in the 2018–19 Belgian Second Amateur Division Promotion play-offs, wins promotion to the 2019–20 Belgian First Amateur Division. Therefore, Givry and Tournai will play a third-place match.

==== Third place match ====
26 May 2019
20:00

Givry	3–1	Tournai
Sylla 72'; Remy 45' (pen.); Fondaire 84' (pen.)		Tandoh 84'

By winning, Givry was first in line to promote in case an extra available spot. As Visé won promotion to the Belgian First Amateur Division, an extra ACFF team was promoted, resulting in Givry moving up.

== Relegation play-offs ==
=== ACFF ===
4 May 2019
20:00

Oppagne-Wéris	3–1	Ganshoren

Due to the results in higher leagues, prior to the match it was certain the winner of this ACFF play-off would avoid relegation. Ganshoren was eventually spared as well.

=== VFV ===
12 May 2019
15:00

Oostkamp	2–1	Ternesse

At the time of the match, it was yet uncertain whether there would be one or two extra VFV teams relegated from the 2018–19 Belgian Third Amateur Division. Ternesse faced relegation by losing the match, Oostkamp also faced relegation three weeks later as ACFF team Visé got promoted, resulting in an extra team from VFV to be relegated.
