= 2023–24 Belgian Division 2 =

Belgian Division 2
- Season: 2023–24
- Dates: 26 August 2023 – 12 May 2024
- Champions: Aalst (VV A), Belisia (VV B), Mons (ACFF)
- Promoted: Ninove, Merelbeke, Jong Cercle, Belisia, Hasselt, Lyra-Lierse, Mons, Rochefort, Tubize-Braine, Tournai, Binche, Stockay, Union SG B
- Relegated: Aalst, Mandel United, Wetteren, Overijse, Londerzeel, City Pirates, Warnant, Hamoir, Rebecq

The 2023–24 Belgian Division 2 was the eighth season of the division in its current format, placed at the fourth-tier of football in Belgium.

== Team changes ==
=== In ===
- The champions from each of the four divisions of the 2022–23 Belgian Division 3 were directly promoted: Overijse (VV A), Wezel (VV B), Mons (ACFF A) and Rochefort (ACFF B).
- Also promoted after winning the promotion play-off were Voorde-Appelterre, Houtvenne, Tournai and La Calamine.
- Ninove, Rupel Boom and Mandel United were all relegated from the 2022–23 Belgian National Division 1 after finishing in the bottom three places.

=== Out ===
- Lokeren-Temse and Cappellen were promoted to the 2023–24 Belgian National Division 1 as champions in their respective VV divisions.
- On ACFF side, runners-up Union Namur were promoted, due to the fact that champions Warnant decided not to apply for a licence making them ineligible for promotion.
- Westhoek, Erpe-Mere, Pepingen-Halle, Beerschot U23, Solières, RFC Seraing U23 and Waremme were all directly relegated to the 2023–24 Belgian Division 3 based on their finishing position.
- Finally, Turnhout lost the relegation play-off and was also relegated as a result.

=== Merger ===
- Before the start of the season it became known that D2 ACFF club Stade Disonais would merge with RCS Verviers who were playing in the 2nd Provincial Division in Liège to form Stade Verviétois.

== Belgian Division 2 VV A ==
Locations of the 2023–24 Belgian Division 2 VV A teams

=== League table ===
Pos	Team	Pld	W	D	L	GF	GA	GD	Pts	Qualification or relegation
1	Aalst (Note: As champions, Eendracht Aalst would have earned promotion but on 23 May 2024 (after completion of the season and playoffs) the club was refused a license for the Belgian National Division 1. As a result, second-placed Ninove (who had been eliminated in the playoffs) were promoted instead. A few days later on 27 May 2024, the club was also refused a license for the Belgian Division 2 and Belgian Division 3 and hence will be relegated to the Belgian Provincial Leagues.) (C, D)	34	19	7	8	60	35	+25	64	Relegation to the Belgian Provincial Leagues
2	Ninove (P)	34	17	7	10	57	48	+9	58	Qualification for the Promotion play-offs VV
3	Dikkelvenne (Note: Dikkelvenne, Voorde-Appelterre, Oudenaarde, and Oostkamp all would have qualified for the Promotion play-offs VV yet were skipped by the next eligible team due to the fact they had chosen not to apply for a national football license.)	34	15	11	8	67	48	+19	56	
4	Merelbeke (O, P)	34	16	6	12	68	43	+25	54	Qualification for the Promotion play-offs VV
5	Jong Cercle (O, P)	34	16	5	13	64	51	+13	53	Qualification for the Promotion play-offs VV
6	Voorde-Appelterre	34	15	8	11	54	56	−2	53	
7	Oudenaarde	34	13	11	10	45	39	+6	50	
8	Oostkamp	34	14	7	13	58	68	−10	49	
9	Jong Essevee	34	14	6	14	53	44	+9	48	Qualification for the Promotion play-offs VV
10	Gullegem	34	14	5	15	57	64	−7	47	
11	Torhout	34	13	8	13	47	61	−14	47	
12	Racing Gent	34	13	6	15	54	53	+1	45	
13	Zelzate	34	12	6	16	63	60	+3	42	
14	Olsa Brakel	34	11	6	17	38	47	−9	39	
15	Harelbeke	34	9	12	13	47	56	−9	39	
16	Petegem (Note: Due to the fact that Aalst was refused a license, Petegem was ultimately spared of relegation.)	34	10	8	16	54	63	−9	38	
17	Mandel United (R)	34	10	7	17	27	46	−19	37	Relegation to the 2024–25 Belgian Division 3
18	Wetteren (R)	34	8	8	18	49	80	−31	32	Relegation to the 2024–25 Belgian Division 3

Source: vbal4
Rules for classification: 1) Points; 2) Matches won; 3) Goal difference; 4) Goals scored; 5) Away matches won; 6) Goal difference in away matches; 7) Away goals scored.
(C) Champions; (D) Disqualified; (O) Play-off winners; (P) Promoted; (R) Relegated

=== Results ===
Home \ Away	AAL	DIK	NIN	MER	CER	VOO	ESS	OUD	OOS	GEN	GUL	TOR	ZEL	BRA	MAN	HAR	PET	WET
Aalst	—	0–3	3–0	1–0	2–3	1–2	1–0	2–0	4–1	0–0	1–3	3–1	1–0	1–1	1–2	1–1	3–1	0–0
Dikkelvenne	1–1	—	1–1	0–5	3–0	6–2	2–0	0–0	1–2	4–2	2–0	1–3	1–1	2–0	2–0	2–2	3–1	5–2
Ninove	2–0	1–2	—	3–2	0–2	3–0	1–0	1–1	4–1	2–0	1–1	0–0	2–1	1–0	4–1	2–1	4–5	3–0
Merelbeke	0–2	2–0	3–1	—	0–0	2–3	0–2	1–1	1–2	1–4	4–0	4–1	3–0	2–0	1–1	4–0	5–2	1–3
Jong Cercle	0–1	1–1	2–3	0–3	—	2–3	3–0	3–0	5–1	2–2	4–2	8–1	1–4	2–1	1–4	2–1	0–2	4–2
Voorde-Appelterre	0–1	1–2	3–0	1–1	3–2	—	2–1	0–0	5–1	1–0	0–2	1–1	3–1	0–1	2–1	3–1	1–4	2–2
Jong Essevee	0–0	2–2	3–1	0–1	1–1	4–0	—	3–5	0–0	1–1	0–2	3–0	1–0	2–1	0–0	1–2	4–1	2–1
Oudenaarde	0–1	1–1	2–0	1–4	3–0	1–3	3–0	—	1–1	2–0	3–2	1–0	3–0	0–0	1–1	0–2	1–0	5–1
Oostkamp	0–4	2–1	1–1	2–2	1–2	2–2	1–5	2–0	—	1–3	2–1	1–2	2–1	2–1	1–1	3–1	3–1	2–3
Racing Gent	2–3	3–2	1–0	1–1	1–2	0–1	3–0	3–1	2–3	—	3–1	0–2	1–1	2–1	1–0	7–2	1–0	2–3
Gullegem	1–3	2–2	1–2	4–3	0–2	2–2	1–5	1–0	2–1	3–1	—	1–3	2–0	2–3	1–2	2–1	2–0	4–4
Torhout	3–2	1–0	3–4	2–1	2–1	4–1	0–3	0–0	2–3	2–1	0–1	—	0–6	1–1	2–1	3–1	0–0	4–1
Zelzate	1–3	4–7	1–3	1–2	1–0	1–1	3–2	1–3	4–3	1–2	1–2	1–1	—	4–0	1–2	2–2	3–1	6–0
Olsa Brakel	2–3	3–2	3–1	0–3	2–0	0–3	1–2	1–1	0–2	3–0	3–0	2–0	2–4	—	1–0	0–0	3–1	0–1
Mandel United	0–2	0–0	0–1	1–0	0–4	1–0	0–2	1–2	0–2	0–3	1–1	1–1	0–2	1–0	—	0–2	2–0	1–0
Harelbeke	1–0	1–1	1–1	2–0	0–3	4–0	2–1	2–2	2–2	2–1	2–3	2–0	1–2	1–1	0–1	—	2–2	0–1
Petegem	1–6	2–3	2–2	0–1	1–2	1–1	2–1	2–0	3–2	4–0	2–1	1–1	1–1	0–1	3–0	1–1	—	3–3
Wetteren	3–3	0–2	1–2	2–5	0–0	1–2	1–2	0–1	1–3	1–1	1–4	4–1	2–3	1–0	2–1	2–2	0–4	—

Source: vbal4 (in Dutch)
Legend: Blue = home team win; Yellow = draw; Red = away team win.

=== Period Champions ===
- 1st Period: Aalst (20 Points (out of 30))
- 2nd Period: Oostkamp (25 Points (out of 36))
- 3rd Period: Aalst (24 Points (out of 36))

== Belgian Division 2 VV B ==
Locations of the 2023–24 Belgian Division 2 VV B teams

=== League table ===
Pos	Team	Pld	W	D	L	GF	GA	GD	Pts	Qualification or relegation
1	Belisia (C, P)	34	21	8	5	71	37	+34	71	Promotion to the 2024–25 Belgian National Division 1
2	Hasselt (O, P)	34	21	4	9	67	37	+30	67	Qualification for the Promotion play-offs VV
3	Lyra-Lierse Berlaar (O, P)	34	18	6	10	61	47	+14	60	Qualification for the Promotion play-offs VV
4	Rupel Boom	34	18	6	10	62	58	+4	60	Qualification for the Promotion play-offs VV
5	Racing Mechelen	34	16	7	11	61	46	+15	55	
6	Houtvenne	34	15	10	9	48	43	+5	55	
7	Bocholt	34	16	6	12	59	46	+13	54	
8	Tongeren	34	14	6	14	50	48	+2	48	
9	Lebbeke	34	13	8	13	49	53	−4	47	
10	Jong KV Mechelen	34	13	7	14	57	49	+8	46	Qualification for the Promotion play-offs VV
11	Berchem	34	12	10	12	44	43	+1	46	
12	Diegem	34	13	6	15	62	63	−1	45	
13	Wezel	34	12	7	15	59	67	−8	43	
14	Hades	34	12	6	16	54	60	−6	42	
15	Lille	34	11	7	16	48	60	−12	40	
16	Overijse (R)	34	7	7	20	33	59	−26	28	Relegation to the 2024–25 Belgian Division 3
17	City Pirates (R)	34	7	4	23	41	86	−45	25	Relegation to the 2024–25 Belgian Division 3
18	Londerzeel (R)	34	6	7	21	34	58	−24	25	Relegation to the 2024–25 Belgian Division 3

Source: vbal4
Rules for classification: 1) Points; 2) Matches won; 3) Goal difference; 4) Goals scored; 5) Away matches won; 6) Goal difference in away matches; 7) Away goals scored.
(C) Champions; (O) Play-off winners; (P) Promoted; (R) Relegated

=== Results ===
Home \ Away	BEL	HAS	LLB	RUP	RCM	HOU	BOC	TON	LEB	KVM	BER	DIE	WEZ	HAD	LIL	OVE	C-P	LON
Belisia	—	1–1	1–1	2–0	4–2	2–0	2–1	3–0	1–0	1–0	2–1	2–1	3–2	4–1	1–1	3–0	4–0	2–1
Hasselt	2–1	—	2–0	4–1	3–0	1–1	1–0	1–0	5–0	1–1	2–0	0–2	4–1	3–1	0–2	3–0	3–1	0–3
Lyra-Lierse Berlaar	0–2	3–0	—	3–0	2–1	0–1	2–1	2–4	2–0	2–0	2–1	5–0	1–1	2–1	4–2	2–2	2–1	1–1
Rupel Boom	1–5	3–2	2–5	—	0–0	2–2	1–0	3–1	3–1	4–1	2–1	1–1	2–2	4–3	2–1	2–1	3–2	2–1
Racing Mechelen	1–1	0–1	4–1	0–2	—	3–1	3–0	1–1	0–1	2–5	3–0	1–0	3–0	2–4	1–0	1–0	2–3	1–0
Houtvenne	0–0	2–4	0–0	1–2	0–3	—	2–2	1–2	1–1	1–0	1–1	4–1	1–0	2–0	0–0	3–2	3–0	0–0
Bocholt	1–2	2–1	2–4	0–5	1–1	1–1	—	3–2	4–1	0–1	0–1	2–2	4–2	2–0	2–2	3–0	4–1	2–0
Tongeren	0–2	3–2	0–2	1–2	2–0	1–2	0–3	—	1–1	3–1	0–0	3–0	3–1	2–3	3–0	3–0	2–0	1–0
Lebbeke	2–2	1–3	1–2	2–1	1–2	5–1	2–0	0–0	—	1–1	0–0	2–1	3–2	2–2	2–1	3–0	2–2	3–2
Jong KV Mechelen	4–1	0–1	5–0	1–2	0–0	1–2	4–4	4–0	1–0	—	0–2	3–0	0–0	1–2	1–2	6–4	4–2	3–0
Berchem	1–1	1–1	0–1	3–0	1–1	2–3	0–3	2–0	2–0	1–3	—	1–1	2–2	3–2	1–1	2–0	4–0	1–0
Diegem	3–4	1–0	3–2	2–2	3–1	1–2	1–2	1–2	5–1	4–1	2–2	—	1–2	3–2	2–3	2–0	3–0	2–4
Wezel	3–0	2–3	4–1	1–0	2–5	2–1	1–3	1–5	0–2	2–0	4–1	0–1	—	1–0	3–1	2–2	4–3	2–0
Hades	2–1	2–1	2–2	3–1	1–4	1–3	0–1	1–1	2–3	0–0	1–2	3–3	3–2	—	3–1	0–0	2–1	0–1
Lille	2–0	1–2	1–0	4–3	1–3	0–3	0–1	1–0	0–3	2–2	0–2	2–0	5–3	2–1	—	1–1	1–2	3–2
Overijse	0–4	0–1	0–3	1–2	1–2	2–0	0–2	5–0	2–1	0–1	2–0	0–2	1–1	0–2	2–1	—	2–0	0–0
City Pirates	3–3	0–6	2–0	0–1	1–5	0–1	1–0	0–4	1–2	2–0	2–1	2–3	2–2	0–2	3–3	1–3	—	2–1
Londerzeel	0–4	1–3	0–2	1–1	3–3	1–2	0–3	0–0	1–0	1–2	1–2	2–5	1–2	0–2	2–1	0–0	4–1	—

Source: vbal4 (in Dutch)
Legend: Blue = home team win; Yellow = draw; Red = away team win.

=== Period Champions ===
- 1st Period: Jong KV Mechelen (21 Points)
- 2nd Period: Hasselt (27 Points)
- 3rd Period: Belisia (29 Points)

== Belgian Division 2 ACFF ==
Locations of the 2023–24 Belgian Division 2 ACFF teams

=== League table ===
Pos	Team	Pld	W	D	L	GF	GA	GD	Pts	Qualification or relegation
1	Mons (C, P)	34	27	4	3	76	23	+53	85	Promotion to the 2024–25 Belgian National Division 1
2	Rochefort (P)	34	20	6	8	64	40	+24	66	Qualification for the Promotion play-offs ACFF
3	Tubize-Braine (O, P)	34	19	9	6	64	35	+29	66	Qualification for the Promotion play-offs ACFF
4	Tournai (P)	34	17	12	5	59	33	+26	63	Qualification for the Promotion play-offs ACFF
5	Binche (P)	34	15	9	10	52	44	+8	54	Qualification for the Promotion play-offs ACFF
6	Meux	34	12	14	8	51	45	+6	50	
7	Warnant (R)	34	14	7	13	45	42	+3	49	Restarting at bottom of football pyramid
8	Stockay (Note: After conclusion of the play-offs, Stockay and Union SG B were also promoted. Stockay as highest-placed finisher with a license not already promoted, Union SG B as highest eligible U23 team.) (P)	34	13	8	13	59	50	+9	47	Promotion to the 2024–25 Belgian National Division 1
9	La Calamine	34	12	9	13	53	54	−1	45	
10	La Louvière Centre	34	13	5	16	48	47	+1	44	
11	Union SG B (P)	34	13	4	17	55	56	−1	43	Promotion to the 2024–25 Belgian National Division 1
12	Verviers	34	11	8	15	56	64	−8	41	
13	Verlaine	34	11	7	16	50	59	−9	40	
14	Ganshoren	34	10	9	15	44	57	−13	39	
15	Jette	34	9	8	17	33	63	−30	35	
16	Acren-Lessines	34	8	9	17	56	75	−19	33	
17	Hamoir (R)	34	6	5	23	30	71	−41	23	Relegation to the 2024–25 Belgian Division 3
18	Rebecq (R)	34	3	13	18	43	80	−37	22	Relegation to the 2024–25 Belgian Division 3

Source: vbal4
Rules for classification: 1) Points; 2) Matches won; 3) Goal difference; 4) Goals scored; 5) Away matches won; 6) Goal difference in away matches; 7) Away goals scored.
(C) Champions; (O) Play-off winners; (P) Promoted; (R) Relegated

=== Results ===
Home \ Away	MON	ROC	TUB	TOU	WRN	BIN	LAL	S-W	MEU	LAC	USG	VER	VEV	GAN	JET	A-L	HAM	REB
Mons	—	1–0	2–0	1–3	1–0	2–0	2–0	2–0	1–1	2–1	2–0	5–0	3–1	4–1	3–0	5–2	3–1	2–2
Rochefort	0–2	—	2–3	1–1	1–0	1–2	2–0	2–0	1–1	5–4	2–1	1–0	3–3	2–1	5–1	2–3	3–0	2–0
Tubize-Braine	0–1	0–1	—	1–1	2–0	2–1	2–0	2–2	0–1	2–1	2–0	3–0	4–1	2–2	2–0	1–0	4–1	2–1
Tournai	1–1	0–1	1–1	—	2–1	3–1	2–1	2–1	2–0	1–0	0–2	2–0	1–0	4–3	6–0	1–0	3–2	3–0
Warnant	0–2	1–0	1–0	1–2	—	3–2	0–2	1–0	3–0	1–1	0–0	1–1	2–1	5–0	4–0	3–0	3–1	2–2
Binche	0–3	1–3	1–1	2–1	2–2	—	2–0	2–2	3–4	0–0	3–2	3–2	4–1	1–0	0–0	0–2	0–0	0–0
La Louvière Centre	0–3	1–2	2–2	1–1	0–1	1–4	—	3–1	2–3	1–0	1–2	4–1	0–0	1–0	3–0	2–0	3–0	3–1
Stockay	1–5	2–2	2–2	2–2	2–0	1–2	1–0	—	0–0	3–2	3–0	1–1	0–1	3–1	2–0	5–1	4–0	3–1
Meux	2–1	1–4	1–1	2–2	5–0	0–0	0–4	1–1	—	2–1	2–3	1–1	3–1	1–0	2–3	1–1	5–0	3–1
La Calamine	1–3	2–1	0–2	1–1	2–1	2–0	2–1	1–2	0–0	—	0–0	1–0	1–4	2–0	1–1	5–0	2–1	3–1
Union SG B	1–3	3–4	1–3	0–2	4–0	0–2	3–1	1–4	0–0	4–0	—	0–1	4–5	0–2	1–3	1–2	4–0	5–0
Verlaine	3–1	2–1	1–3	3–1	0–2	1–2	0–1	4–2	1–2	2–2	6–0	—	1–3	2–2	5–3	3–1	0–2	2–2
Verviers	0–2	2–2	2–5	2–2	1–3	1–2	3–1	2–1	3–1	0–1	0–0	0–1	—	3–1	1–0	4–1	2–4	1–3
Ganshoren	0–3	0–3	1–0	2–0	1–1	0–0	1–1	2–0	2–2	4–1	1–2	3–0	1–1	—	2–1	3–2	1–1	2–2
Jette	0–1	0–1	1–4	0–0	0–0	0–1	2–1	1–0	0–0	2–3	1–5	1–0	1–0	2–1	—	3–2	1–0	2–2
Acren-Lessines	1–2	1–1	2–3	3–3	3–1	1–3	1–1	4–0	1–1	3–3	1–2	1–2	3–3	2–1	0–0	—	3–1	6–5
Hamoir	0–1	0–1	1–2	0–2	0–1	2–0	2–3	0–3	1–0	0–3	0–3	2–2	2–3	0–3	2–2	2–1	—	0–0
Rebecq	1–1	1–2	1–1	0–0	2–1	1–6	1–3	0–5	1–3	4–4	0–1	0–2	1–1	2–3	3–2	2–2	0–2	—

Source: vbal4 (in Dutch)
Legend: Blue = home team win; Yellow = draw; Red = away team win.

=== Period Champions ===
- 1st Period: Mons (30 Points)
- 2nd Period: Mons (25 Points)
- 3rd Period: Mons (30 Points)

== Promotion play-offs ==
=== Promotion play-offs VV ===
The play-offs feature eight teams, the two second-place finishers in divisions VV A and VV B as well as from each division the winners of each of the three periods (for periods won by overall champions or runners-up the highest team not yet qualified takes the spot instead). The eight teams play a knockout tournament, with all teams unseeded when setting up the draw. Due to the reform of the Belgian National Division 1 (into a separate VV and ACFF division) and uncertainty about the number of VV teams to be relegated from the Challenger Pro League, it was uncertain at the start of the playoffs how many teams would be promoted. In any case, at most one U23 team would be promoted.

Qualified teams:

- Hasselt (runner-up division VV B)
- Jong Cercle (highest place eligible finisher (5th) not directly qualified from division VV A)
- Jong Essevee (2nd highest place eligible finisher (9th) not directly qualified from division VV A)
- Jong KV Mechelen (winner period 1 division VV B)
- Lyra-Lierse Berlaar (highest place eligible finisher (3rd) not directly qualified from division VV B)
- Merelbeke (winner period 3 division VV A)
- Ninove (runner-up division VV A)
- Rupel Boom (highest place eligible finisher (4th) not directly qualified from division VV B)

Round 1
11 May 2024
Jong Cercle	1
Jong KV Mechelen	0
11 May 2024
Hasselt	1
Ninove	0
12 May 2024
Merelbeke	2
Jong Essevee	1
12 May 2024
Lyra-Lierse Berlaar	5
Rupel Boom	0

Round 2
23 May 2024 (Cancelled)
Jong Cercle
Hasselt
23 May 2024 (Cancelled)
Merelbeke
Lyra-Lierse Berlaar

Placing 1st/2nd
26 May 2024 (Cancelled)
Winner Round 2 Match 1
Winner Round 2 Match 2
Placing 3rd/4th
26 May 2024 (Cancelled)
Loser Round 2 Match 1
Loser Round 2 Match 2

==== Round 1 ====
11 May 2024

Jong Cercle	1–0	Jong KV Mechelen
Gijdé 90+2' (pen.)

11 May 2024

Hasselt	1–0	Ninove
Vanrafelghem 86'

12 May 2024

Merelbeke	2–1 (a.e.t.)	Jong Essevee
Binst 102'; Boskamp 113'		Kotchkarov 112'

12 May 2024

Lyra-Lierse Berlaar	5–0	Rupel Boom
Kil 30'; Van Goylen 44'; Adesanya 53'; Peffer 67', 88'

After completion of round 1, it was nearly certain that the four winners would all be promoted, as six spots were available for VV teams with the first two spots taken by champions Eendracht Aalst and Belisia Bilzen, and the four round 1 winners included only one U23 team. On 17 May 2024, this was confirmed as Oostende would not be receiving a license to play in the Challenger Pro League (and thus be relegated), but would also not be receiving a license for the National Division 1, meaning it would directly relegate two levels meaning still six spots opened up, and the four round 1 winners were instantly promoted. Further rounds were thus canceled, as well as the consolation round for possible extra spots (where Jong Essevee had been drawn at home to Ninove, and Jong KV Mechelen was to host Rupel-Boom). A final twist followed a few days later when news was released that Division VV A winners Eendracht Aalst had been refused a license to be promoted and per the rules, this meant the automatic promoted shifted to the next highest eligible team Ninove, despite the fact they had lost the promotion playoffs a few days prior.

In the end, Hasselt, Jong Cercle, Lyra-Lierse Berlaar, Merelbeke and Ninove were promoted.

=== Promotion play-offs ACFF ===
The play-offs feature four teams, the second-place finishers and the winners of each of the three periods (for periods won by overall champions or runners-up the highest team not yet qualified takes the spot instead). Overall champions Mons had won all three periods and hence the four highest eligible finishers were taking part:

Qualified teams:

- Binche (3rd highest place eligible finisher (5th) not directly qualified from division ACFF)
- Rochefort (runner-up division ACFF)
- Tournai (2nd highest place eligible finisher (4th) not directly qualified from division ACFF)
- Tubize-Braine (highest place eligible finisher (3rd) not directly qualified from division ACFF)

Going into the playoffs it was already certain that all teams would be promoted due to the reform of the National Division 1 which was split into a VV and ACFF division. The playoffs were played nevertheless.

Semi-final
18 May 2024
Tournai	5
Binche	2
19 May 2024
Rochefort	0
Tubize-Braine	5

Placing 1st/2nd
24 May 2024
Tournai	1
Tubize-Braine	4
Placing 3rd/4th
26 May 2024
Binche	1 (4)
Rochefort	1 (3)

==== Round 1 ====
18 May 2024
20:00

Tournai	5–2	Binche
Henry 7'; Robail 13' (pen.); Strobbe 32'; Destrain 45' (pen.); Pieraert 76'		Renquin 53'; Scohy 63'

19 May 2024
15:00

Rochefort	0–5	Tubize-Braine
		El Omari 4', 26', 85', 90'; Hendrickx 11'

All four teams were promoted.
