= RAEC Mons =

RAEC Mons may refer to one of two Belgian football clubs:

- RAEC Mons (1910), the club which used this name between 1934 and its dissolution in 2015
- RAEC Mons (2015), the club which has used this name since 2020.
