= RAEC =

RAEC may refer to:

- RAEC Mons (1910), a Belgian football club which used this name between 1934 and its dissolution in 2015
- RAEC Mons (2015), a club which has used this name since 2020.
- Royal Army Educational Corps
- Royal Aero Club (RAeC)
