= Mayingila Nzuzi Mata =

French footballer (born 1994)

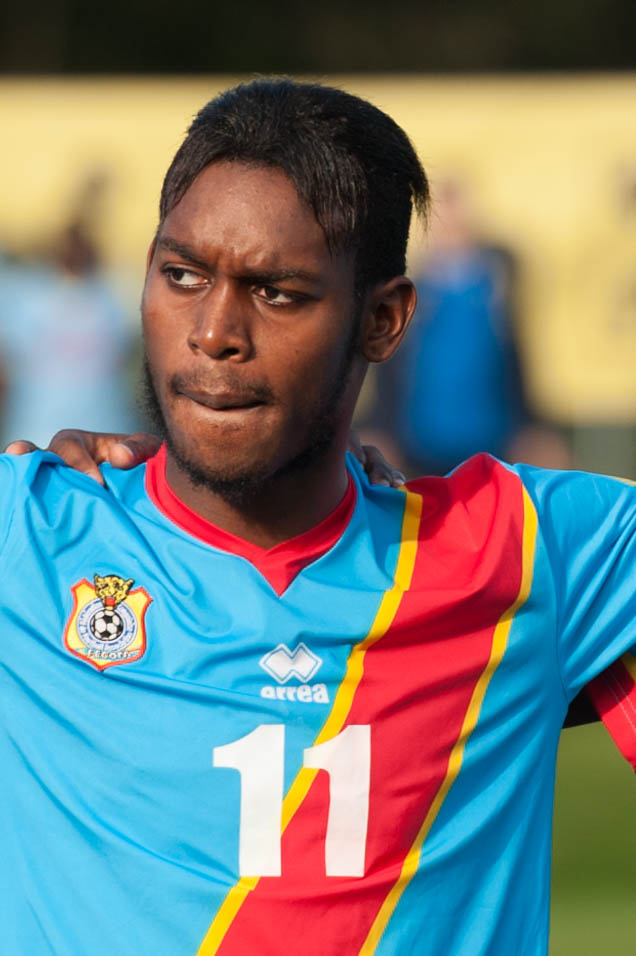
- Nzuzi with DR Congo national U20 team in 2014

Personal information
- Date of birth: 17 May 1994 (age 32)
- Place of birth: Paris, France
- Height: 1.81 m (5 ft 11 in)
- Position: Forward

Team information
- Current team: RAEC Mons
- Number: 9

Youth career
- –2012: Paris FC
- 2012–2014: Chamois Niortais

Senior career*
| Years | Team | Apps | (Gls) |
| 2014–2015 | Chamois Niortais | 5 | (0) |
| 2015–2016 | Chambly | 19 | (2) |
| 2016–2017 | Paris Saint-Germain B | 20 | (3) |
| 2017–2018 | Boulogne-Billancourt | 17 | (7) |
| 2018–2019 | Dunkerque | 33 | (12) |
| 2019–2020 | Red Star | 16 | (0) |
| 2020–2022 | RWDM | 48 | (15) |
| 2022–2024 | Tuzlaspor | 42 | (11) |
| 2024 | Nantong Zhiyun | 14 | (1) |
| 2024 | Esenler Erokspor | 1 | (0) |
| 2025 | Shenzhen Juniors | 22 | (6) |
| 2026– | RAEC Mons | 8 | (0) |
- * Club domestic league appearances and goals as of 28 June 2026

Mayingila Nzuzi Mata (born 17 May 1994), also known as Kévin Nzuzi Mata, is a professional footballer who plays as a forward for RAEC Mons. Born in France, he represented the DR Congo U20 national team.

== Early life ==
Nzuzi Mata was born in the 18th arrondissement of Paris to parents who were both born in Léopoldville, Belgian Congo. He acquired French nationality on 6 December 2000 through the collective effect of his parents' naturalization.

== Club career ==
Nzuzi Mata began his career with Chamois Niortais, where he made five appearances in Ligue 2 during the 2014–15 season. He went on to join FC Chambly on a one-year deal in the summer of 2015, after being released by Niort.

In June 2016, he signed a professional contract with Paris Saint-Germain to play with the reserve team in Championnat de France Amateur.

In the summer of 2017 he moved to Boulogne-Billancourt in Championnat National 2 and in 2018 he joined Dunkerque in Championnat National.

In July 2019, he signed for Red Star. There, he made 17 appearances in which he failed to score.

In August 2020, it was announced that N'Zuzi Mata had signed a one-year contract with the option of an additional year with Belgian First Division B club RWDM.

In January 2024, he signed for Chinese Super League club Nantong Zhiyun.

== International career ==
Nzuzi Mata played a friendly match with DR Congo national U20 team in October 2014.

== Career statistics ==
As of match played 8 November 2025.

Appearances and goals by club, season and competition
| Club | Season | League | | | National cup | | League cup | | Total | |
| Club | Season | Division | Apps | Goals | Apps | Goals | Apps | Goals | Apps | Goals |
|---|---|---|---|---|---|---|---|---|---|---|
| Chamois Niortais | 2014–15 | Ligue 2 | 5 | 0 | 2 | 1 | 1 | 0 | 8 | 1 |
| Chambly | 2015–16 | National | 19 | 2 | 3 | 0 | 0 | 0 | 22 | 2 |
| Paris Saint-Germain B | 2016–17 | CFA Group A | 20 | 3 | 0 | 0 | 0 | 0 | 20 | 3 |
| Boulogne-Billancourt | 2017–18 | National 2 | 17 | 7 | 0 | 0 | 0 | 0 | 17 | 7 |
| Dunkerque | 2018–19 | National | 33 | 12 | 1 | 0 | 0 | 0 | 34 | 12 |
| Red Star | 2019–20 | National | 16 | 0 | 1 | 2 | 1 | 0 | 18 | 2 |
| RWDM | 2020–21 | First Division B | 25 | 8 | 1 | 0 | — | | 26 | 8 |
| RWDM | 2021–22 | First Division B | 23 | 7 | 2 | 0 | — | | 25 | 7 |
| RWDM | Total | | 48 | 15 | 3 | 0 | — | | 51 | 15 |
| Tuzlaspor | 2022–23 | TFF First League | 32 | 8 | 2 | 1 | — | | 34 | 9 |
| Tuzlaspor | 2023–24 | TFF First League | 10 | 3 | 0 | 0 | — | | 10 | 3 |
| Tuzlaspor | Total | | 42 | 11 | 2 | 1 | — | | 44 | 12 |
| Nantong Zhiyun | 2024 | Chinese Super League | 14 | 1 | 0 | 0 | — | | 14 | 1 |
| Esenler Erokspor | 2024–25 | TFF First League | 1 | 0 | 0 | 0 | — | | 1 | 0 |
| Shenzhen Juniors | 2025 | China League One | 22 | 6 | 0 | 0 | — | | 22 | 6 |
| Career total | | | 238 | 57 | 12 | 4 | 2 | 0 | 252 | 61 |
