= Gyamfi Kyeremeh =

Belgian footballer

Personal information
- Date of birth: 9 March 1995 (age 31)
- Place of birth: Belgium
- Height: 1.70 m (5 ft 7 in)
- Position: Winger

Team information
- Current team: Merelbeke
- Number: 7

Youth career
- Lokeren
- Zulte Waregem
- Waasland-Beveren

Senior career*
Years	Team	Apps	(Gls)
2014–2015	Waasland-Beveren	1	(0)
2015–2017	Eintracht Braunschweig II	38	(1)
2017–2018	Oldham Athletic	1	(0)
2019–2020	Ronse	24	(5)
2020–2021	Knokke	1	(0)
2021–2022	Rupel Boom	24	(1)
2022–2023	Lokeren-Temse	1	(0)
2023	→ Harelbeke (loan)	16	(2)
2023–2025	Harelbeke	56	(5)
2025–	Merelbeke	24	(1)
- * Club domestic league appearances and goals as of 3 May 2026

Gyamfi Kyeremeh (born 9 March 1995) is a Belgian footballer who plays as a winger for Merelbeke.

== Career ==
Kyeremeh made his professional debut on 30 August 2014 in a Belgian Pro League match for Waasland-Beveren against Lierse S.K.

In 2015, he joined the reserve side of the German club Eintracht Braunschweig in the Regionalliga Nord.

In August 2017, Kyeremeh signed a two-year deal with an option of a third at Oldham Athletic A.F.C. following a trial spell.

== Career statistics ==
As of match played 16 September 2017

Appearances and goals by club, season and competition
Club	Season	League			National cup		League cup		Other		Total	
Club	Season	Division	Apps	Goals	Apps	Goals	Apps	Goals	Apps	Goals	Apps	Goals
Waasland Beveren	2014–15	Pro League	1	0	0	0	–		0	0	1	0
Eintracht Braunschweig II	2015–16	Regionalliga Nord	23	1	–		–		0	0	23	1
Eintracht Braunschweig II	2016–17	Regionalliga Nord	15	0	–		–		0	0	15	0
Eintracht Braunschweig II	Total		38	1	0	0	0	0	0	0	38	1
Oldham Athletic (loan)	2017–18	League One	1	0	0	0	0	0	0	0	1	0
Career total			40	1	0	0	0	0	0	0	40	1
