= SV Belisia Bilzen =

Belgian football club

Belisia Bilzen
- Full name: Sportvereniging Belisia Bilzen
- Founded: 2021; 5 years ago
- Ground: Sportpark Katteberg, Bilzen
- Capacity: 2,000
- Manager: Mirko Licata
- League: Belgian Division 1
- 2024–25: Belgian Division 1 VV, 10th of 16
| Home colours | Away colours |

Sportvereniging Belisia Bilzen is a football club based in Bilzen, Limburg, Belgium. The club is affiliated to the Royal Belgian Football Association (KBVB) with matricule 5775 and has sky blue as club colour. The club play in the third-tier Belgian Division 1.

== History ==
=== Rapid Spouwen (1950–2002) ===
The club joined the Royal Belgian Football Association (KBVB) with matricule 5775 as Rapid Spouwen in 1954, starting its existence in the Belgian Provincial Leagues.

In 1974, Spouwen reached the national divisions for the first time. They were able to maintain themselves in the Belgian Fourth Division for several years. In 1976, the second season in Fourth Division, they even finished second place in the league, albeit at a distance from winners White Star FC Beverst. In 1989 they again ended up in second place, this time three points behind title winner FC Poederlee. However, a few years later, in 1992, Spouwen finished third to last. After 18 seasons of in the national divisions, Spouwen returned to provincial football.

The club then also relegated from the First Provincial. In 1998, Spouwen won their group in the Second Provincial, and thus returned to the highest provincial level.

=== Spouwen-Mopertingen (2002–2021) ===
In the 2001–02 season, Spouwen finished fifth in the First Provincial, and qualified for the Limburg Provincial finals. Lutlommel VV and Turkse Rangers were eliminated, which resulted in a place in the interprovincial final rounds. There, however, they lost 5–1 to Union La Calamine and missed the return to the national tiers. That season, besides Spouwen being in First Provincial, nearby GS Mopertingen had recently won promotion to the same division. That club was affiliated to the KBVB with matricule 7073. The two clubs merged after the season to form Spouwen-Mopertingen. The merger club continued to play with Rapid Spouwen's matricule 5775.

The recently merged club immediately finished third in the First Provincial in its first season, and again forced a place in the final rounds for promotion. After SK Bree and RC Hades were knocked out, they once again advanced again to the interprovincial final round. This time they were successful. Spouwen-Mopertingen defeated Jeunesse Rochefortoise and SK Eernegem and again gained promotion to the national Fourth Division, for the first time in 11 years.

In the 2008–09 season, the club participated in the final round in the Fourth Division. In their first game at home, they lost 1–0 to KM Torhout. The 2009–10 season already saw a new high point in club history, as they eliminated RFC Liège and Wielsbeke in the Belgian Cup en route to the round of 16 against Mechelen. They held on to a draw until the 80th minute, Aloys Nong delivered a 1–0 lead to Mechelen. In stoppage time, Giuseppe Rossini expanded the lead to 2–0. Spouwen-Mopertingen left Mechelen home ground Achter de Kazerne to a standing ovation from the opposing supporters after their performance.

In the 2015–16 season, the club again reached the round of 16 of the Belgian Cup. After eliminating Beerschot, Diegem Sport and Oosterzonen, they drew Anderlecht. After an even game, Anderlecht scored the winner in the 89th minute, after a goal by Leander Dendoncker. Later in the season, Spouwen-Mopertingen reached the final play-off round of the Fourth Division. After beating Zwarte Leeuw, the team secured promotion to the Belgian Second Amateur Division.

=== Belisia Bilzen (2021–present) ===
In 2021, Spouwen-Mopertingen merged with Bilzerse Waltwilder, and a new club was formed named Belisia Bilzen, taking its name after the first football club of Bilzen named Belisia, founded in 1912. In August 2021, former Belgian international Luc Nilis became head coach of the team.

In 2023–24, Belisia Bilzen secure promotion to Belgian National Division 1 from 2024 to 2025 after winning of Belgian Division 2 VV A.

== Current squad ==
As of 1 March 2026

Note: Flags indicate national team as defined under FIFA eligibility rules; some limited exceptions apply. Players may hold more than one non-FIFA nationality.

| No. | Pos. | Nation | Player |
|---|---|---|---|
| 1 | GK | BEL | Leonardo Cascio |
| 2 | DF | BEL | Jasper Coolen |
| 3 | MF | BEL | Falke Vandecaetsbeek |
| 6 | DF | BEL | Lucas Chantrain |
| 8 | MF | BEL | Jordi Maus |
| 9 | FW | BEL | Aron Sulejmani |
| 10 | MF | BEL | Tiemen Wijnen |
| 11 | DF | BEL | Matthiece Nelissen |
| 12 | FW | POR | Lukas da Cruz |
| 16 | DF | BEL | Siebren Lathouwers |

| No. | Pos. | Nation | Player |
|---|---|---|---|
| 17 | FW | BEL | Alessandro Bongiorno |
| 18 | DF | BEL | Liam Dello |
| 19 | FW | COD | Nelson Balongo |
| 21 | DF | BEL | Thibaut Lathouwers |
| 22 | GK | BEL | Thijs Lambrix |
| 24 | DF | BEL | Tom Ghislain |
| 26 | MF | BEL | Ayoub Eddahouz |
| 39 | FW | BEL | Arthur Allemeersch |
| - | FW | BEL | Terry Osei-Berkoe |

== Honours ==
- Belgian Division 2
  - Champions (1): 2023–24
