= Mohammed El Âdfaoui =

Belgian footballer (born 2008)

Personal information
- Full name: Mohammed Jamel El Âdfaoui
- Date of birth: 28 February 2008 (age 18)
- Height: 1.82 m (6 ft 0 in)
- Position: Defensive midfielder

Team information
- Current team: Gent
- Number: 28

Youth career
- 2014–2016: RS Forestoise
- 2016–2023: Anderlecht
- 2023–2024: Gent

Senior career*
Years	Team	Apps	(Gls)
2024–	Jong KAA Gent	23	(3)
2025–	Gent	4	(0)

International career
2023	Belgium U15	5	(0)
2023–2024	Belgium U16	6	(0)
2024–	Belgium U17	3	(0)
- * Club domestic league appearances and goals as of 9 November 2025

Mohammed Jamel El Âdfaoui (born 28 February 2008) is a Belgian professional footballer who plays as a defensive midfielder for Gent.

== Club career ==
El Âdfaoui joined the youth academy of RSC Anderlecht at a young age. In 2023, at the age of fifteen, he transferred to Gent. In the 2024/25 season, El Âdfaoui moved up to Jong KAA Gent, the club's reserve team that became champions in Belgian Division 1 that season. In early July 2025, KAA Gent announced that El Âdfaoui had move to the club's first team and extended his contract until mid-2028.

== Interntational career ==
Born in Belgium, El Âdfaoui is of Moroccan descent. He is a youth international for Belgium.
