= Amine Benfriha =

Belgian footballer (born 2005)

Personal information
- Date of birth: 22 December 2005 (age 20)
- Height: 1.86 m (6 ft 1 in)
- Positions: Forward; attacking midfielder

Team information
- Current team: Esperanza Pelt
- Number: 5

Youth career
- KV Mechelen
- Standard Liège

Senior career*
Years	Team	Apps	(Gls)
2022–2024	SL16 FC	13	(0)
2024–2025	Oud-Heverlee Leuven U23	23	(4)
2025–2026	Francs Borains	0	(0)
2026–	Esperanza Pelt	7	(4)
- * Club domestic league appearances and goals as of 26 September 2026

Amine Benfriha (born 22 December 2005) is a Belgian footballer who plays as a forward or an attacking midfielder for Esperanza Pelt in the fifth-tier Belgian Division 3.

== Club career ==
Benfriha made his professional debut for SL16 FC on 19 February 2023, coming on as a substitute against Jong Genk.

On 30 August 2024, Benfriha joined Oud-Heverlee Leuven, signing a two-year contract with the U23 team.

On 4 September 2025, Benfriha moved to Francs Borains.

== Personal life ==
Benfriha is of Algerian descent.
