= KFC Merelbeke =

Association football club in Merelbeke, Belgium

- Full name: Koninklijke Fusieclub Merelbeke
- Short name: Merelbeke
- Founded: 1942; 84 years ago
- Ground: Molenkouterstadion, Merelbeke
- Chairman: Bernard Mortier
- Head coach: Bart Van Renterghem
- League: Belgian Division 1
- 2024–25: Belgian Division 1 VV, 13th of 16
- Website: https://www.kfcmerelbeke.be/molenkouter/
Home colours	Away colours

Koninklijke Fusieclub Merelbeke, simply known as KFC Merelbeke is a Belgian football club based in Merelbeke, East Flanders, registered with the Royal Belgian Football Association under matricule 3551. They compete in Belgian Division 1, playing in their traditional yellow and blue colours.

== Current squad ==
As of 1 March 2026

Note: Flags indicate national team as defined under FIFA eligibility rules; some limited exceptions apply. Players may hold more than one non-FIFA nationality.

No.	Pos.	Nation	Player
1	GK	BEL	Nathan Elyn
2	DF	BEL	Per Gordts
3	DF	BEL	Jolan Van De Velde
5	DF	BEL	Gillis Verhelst
6	DF	BEL	Merijn Rogiers
7	FW	BEL	Gyamfi Kyeremeh
8	MF	BEL	Beau Ponnet
10	FW	GHA	Richard Antwi
11	FW	BEL	Tarik El Boutaibe
12	DF	BEL	Vic Seurynck
14	FW	BEL	Arjunah Crighton
18	DF	BEL	Xander Balcaen

No.	Pos.	Nation	Player
19	MF	BEL	Nasseredine Mazouz
22	MF	BEL	Christian Bello Rivero
23	DF	BEL	Max De Ruyver
26	DF	BEL	Wout Vrijens
29	MF	BEL	Arne Van Den Eynde
30	FW	BEL	Nico Binst
35	DF	BEL	Nicolas Thienpont
36	FW	CIV	Oscar N'Guettia
40	GK	BEL	Wannes Carnewal
90	GK	BEL	Sef Van Damme
99	GK	BEL	Emiel Gardeyn

== Honours ==
- Belgian Division 2
  - Runner-up (1): 2023–24
- Belgian Division 3
  - Winner (1): 2018–19
