= Liamine Mokdad =

French footballer (born 2000)

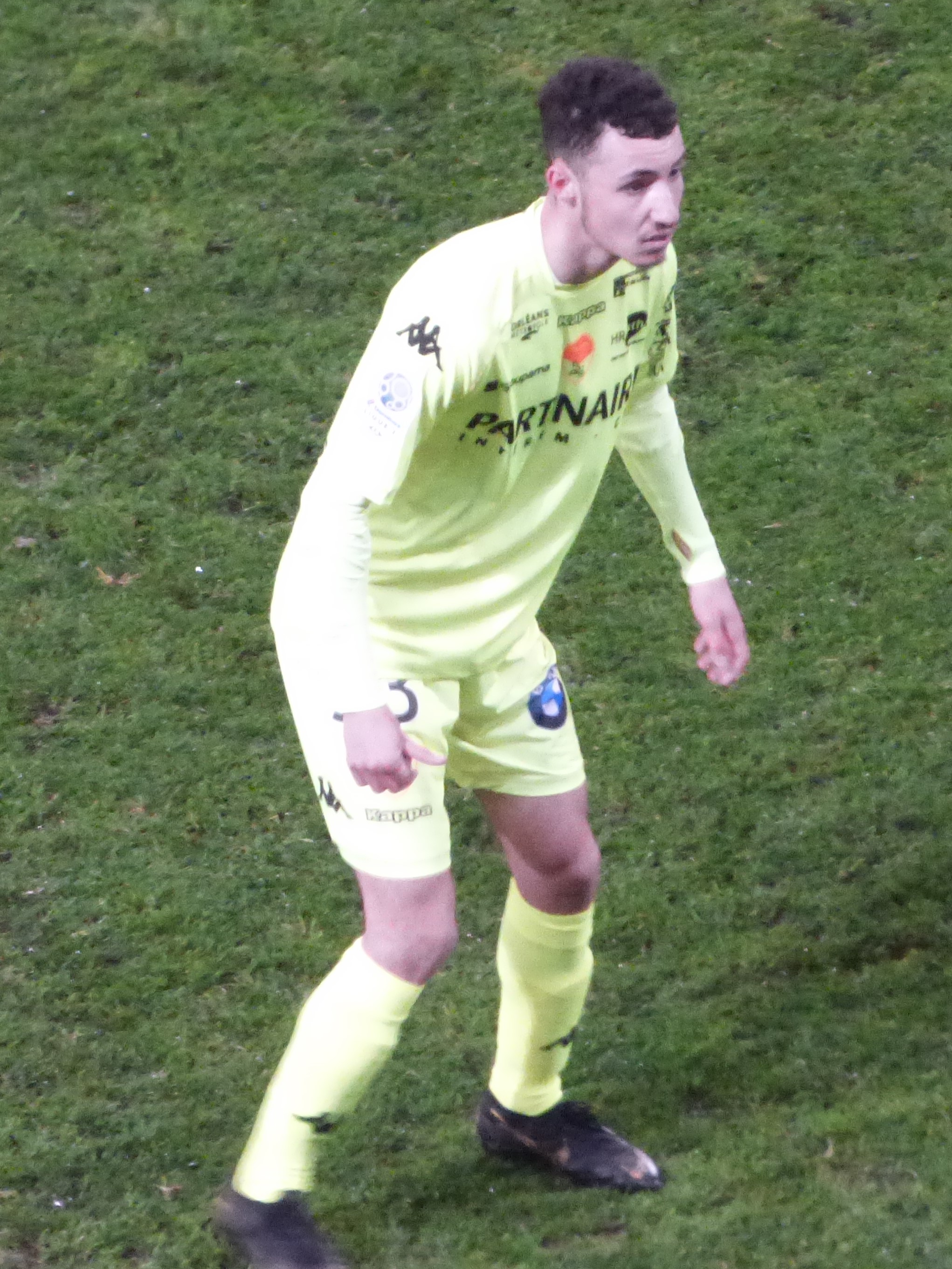
- Mokdad with Orléans in 2020

Personal information
- Date of birth: 21 May 2000 (age 26)
- Place of birth: Gonesse, France
- Height: 1.83 m (6 ft 0 in)
- Position: Midfielder

Team information
- Current team: Créteil
- Number: 25

Senior career*
Years	Team	Apps	(Gls)
2019–2023	Orléans II	41	(4)
2019–2023	Orléans	50	(1)
2023–2025	Virton	62	(8)
2025–	Créteil	11	(1)
- * Club domestic league appearances and goals as of 13 February 2026

Liamine Mokdad (born 21 May 2000) is a French professional footballer who plays as a midfielder for Championnat National 1 club Créteil.

== Career ==
Mokdad made his professional debut with US Orléans in a 4–0 Ligue 2 loss to on 3 December 2019.
