= RFC Tournai =

Former Belgian football club

- Full name: Royal Football Club Tournai
- Founded: 1 July 2002; 23 years ago
- Dissolved: 3 March 2026; 2 months ago
- Ground: Stade Luc Varenne, Tournai
- Capacity: 7,552
- 2025–26: Belgian Division 2 ACFF, 16th of 16 (relegated)
Home colours	Away colours

Royal Football Club Tournai, commonly known as RFC Tournai, was a Belgian football club from Tournai in the province of Hainaut. It was formed on 1 July 2002 by the merger of two older Tournai clubs, Royale Union Sportive Tournaisienne (matricule 26, founded 1903) and Royal Racing Club Tournaisien (matricule 36, founded 1908), retaining the Union's matricule 26—at the time one of the ten oldest still in active use in Walloon football. The club played its home matches at the Stade Luc Varenne and was declared bankrupt by the Tournai commercial court on 3 March 2026, leading to the retirement of matricule 26.

== History ==
=== Predecessors (1903–2002) ===
The senior of the two predecessor clubs, Union Sportive Tournaisienne, was founded in Tournai on 17 April 1903, probably from the union of two unaffiliated local sides, Student Club and Athletic Club, and was admitted to the Royal Belgian Football Association as a "club débutant" on 17 November 1903. It first played in the national series in the 1909–10 season and was assigned matricule 26 when the system was introduced in December 1926; the royal title followed on 22 April 1928, and the club took the name Royale Union Sportive Tournaisienne. The Union's only top-flight season was 1951–52, in which it finished bottom of the Belgian First Division with three wins and 12 points. In 1997, RUS Tournaisienne merged with Sporting Club de Pecq (matricule 8786, founded 1981), retaining matricule 26.

The Racing Club Tournaisien was founded in 1908 by two students, Félix Delannay and Georges Syoen, with a Catholic identity in contrast to the Union's more liberal and anticlerical tradition; the two clubs maintained a sustained rivalry over the next nine decades. The Racing Club reached the national series in 1926 and was assigned matricule 36; it received the royal title in 1933. Its single greatest achievement, and the club's most enduring legacy, was winning the 1955–56 Belgian Cup while playing in the Belgian Second Division—a feat not subsequently matched until KV Mechelen in 2019.

By the end of the 1990s, both clubs were in financial difficulty. Racing was placed under administrative relegation in 2001 over a bankruptcy filing, and in 2002 the two boards agreed to merge.

=== RFC Tournai (2002–2026) ===
The merger took effect on 1 July 2002, with the new club taking the name Royal Football Club Tournai, retaining matricule 26, and adopting red, white and black as its colours; matricule 36 was struck off. The merged club began in the third tier and oscillated between the third and fourth tiers in the following two decades.

After more than a decade in the fourth tier, RFC Tournai won the 2022–23 Belgian Division 3 promotion play-offs to return to the fourth tier, and finished fourth in 2023–24—sufficient under that season's expansion rules—to earn promotion to the Belgian National Division 1.

=== Decline and bankruptcy (2024–2026) ===
Following its 2024 promotion to the third tier, the club's on-pitch progress quickly reversed. On 11 May 2025, RFC Tournai lost the final play-down match 2–1 at home to Standard Liège's under-23 side SL16 FC and were relegated back to the fourth tier. Manager Luigi Nasca, who had led the back-to-back promotions, had already left in December 2024 for RAEC Mons.

RFC Tournai entered the 2025–26 Belgian Division 2 season with no points from its first eight competitive matches and a divided board, in which a "French branch" linked to a new sporting management group was at odds with the historic Flemish administration under chairman Rudi Lemoine. By February 2026 the club had been placed under a provisional administrator and was facing the prospect of a general forfeit and a two-division punishment drop; on 3 March 2026 the Tournai commercial court declared the club bankrupt, retiring matricule 26.

== Stadium ==
RFC Tournai played at the Stade Luc Varenne in Tournai. The Union's earlier ground, the Stade Gaston Horlait—later renamed the Stade Magdeleine Lefebvre—sat near the city's hospital and accommodated up to 10,000 spectators in its 1951–52 First Division season; it stood on the original Plaine des Hôpitaux site occupied by the Union from its 1903 foundation until 2004.

== Honours ==
- Belgian Cup
  - Winners: 1955–56 (as Royal Racing Club Tournaisien)
- Belgian Promotion (historic fourth tier)
  - Champions: 2004–05
