= Royal Stockay Saint-Georges-sur-Meuse =

Association football club in Saint-Georges-sur-Meuse, Belgium

- Full name: Royal Stockay Saint-Georges-sur-Meuse
- Short name: Stockay
- Founded: 1935; 90 years ago
- Ground: Terrain rue Joseph Wauters, Saint-Georges-sur-Meuse
- Manager: Marc Grosjean
- League: Belgian National Division 1
- 2023–24: Division 2 ACFF, 8th of 18 (promoted)
- Website: www.royalstockaysaintgeorges.be

Royal Stockay Saint-Georges-sur-Meuse is a Belgian football club based in the city of Saint-Georges-sur-Meuse. The club plays in the Belgian National Division 1, after promotion from the Belgian Division 2 in 2023–24.

== History ==
The club was founded on 3 March 1935 under the name Racing Club Saint-Georges and received matricule number 2239 upon registration and was placed in the provincial leagues in the province of Liège. In 1948, the club relocated to the outskirts of the city towards Warfusée, and therefore changed its name to Racing Club Warfusée. In 1957, after another relocation now to Stockay, the name became Racing Club Stockay-Warfusée and when the club became 50 years old in 1985 it was allowed to add the Royal designation to become Royal Racing Club Stockay-Warfusée or RRC Stockay-Warfusée for short.

It is under that latter name that the club reached for the first time the national level (fourth level), in 1961. Relegating back to the provincial level only three seasons later in 1964. Another short stint at the national level happened between 1970 and 1972. The real move upwards started in 2017 when the club reached the national level again (now fifth level), followed by another promotion in 2019 to the fourth level and in 2024 even up to the highest position ever attained as it was promoted again, now to the third level. At that point the name was altered once more, now to Royal Stockay Saint-Georges-sur-Meuse, often abbreviated as Stockay.

== Honours ==
- Belgian Division 3
  - Winner (1): 2018–19
