= Dylan De Belder =

Belgian footballer (born 1992)

Personal information
- Full name: Dylan Serge De Belder
- Date of birth: 3 April 1992 (age 34)
- Place of birth: Belgium
- Height: 1.85 m (6 ft 1 in)
- Position: Striker

Team information
- Current team: RAEC Mons
- Number: 17

Youth career
- 1998–2001: RLC Mesvin
- 2001–2008: RAEC Mons
- 2008–2009: RAA Louviéroise
- 2009–2011: RAEC Mons

Senior career*
Years	Team	Apps	(Gls)
2011–2015	Mons	35	(1)
2015–2016	Waasland-Beveren	3	(0)
2015–2016	→ Lommel United (loan)	28	(18)
2016–2017	Lierse	35	(22)
2017–2020	Cercle Brugge	67	(10)
2020–2024	Deinze	88	(22)
2024–	RAEC Mons	56	(30)

International career
2010–2011	Belgium U19	3	(0)
2012	Belgium U20	2	(0)
2013	Belgium U21	4	(0)
- * Club domestic league appearances and goals as of 28 June 2026

Dylan Serge De Belder (born 3 April 1992) is a Belgian footballer who plays as a striker for RAEC Mons.
