= Loris Brogno =

Belgian footballer (born 1992)

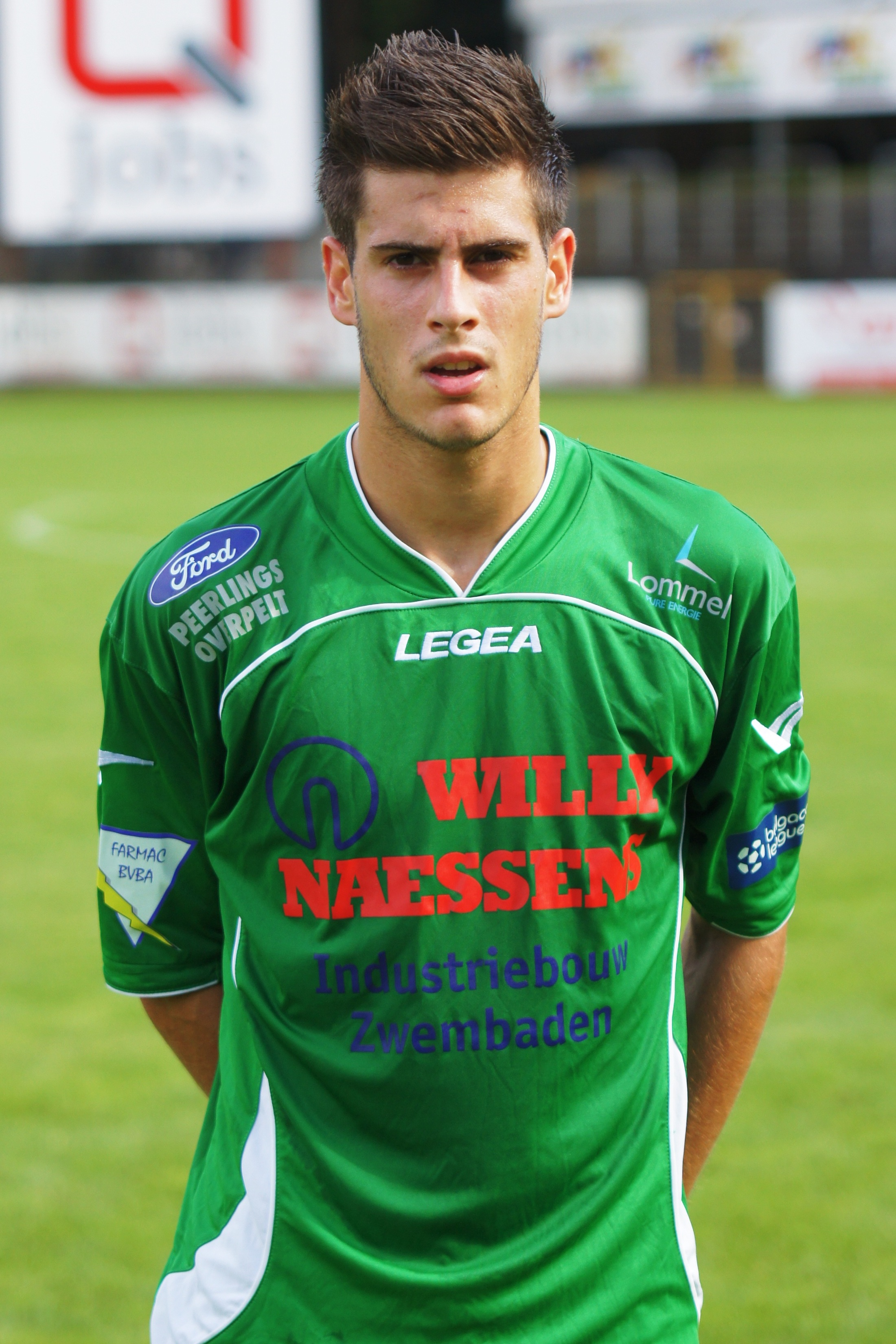

Personal information
- Date of birth: 18 September 1992 (age 34)
- Place of birth: Charleroi, Belgium
- Height: 1.75 m (5 ft 9 in)
- Position: Winger

Team information
- Current team: Mons
- Number: 7

Youth career
- 1996–2002: R.A. Marchiennoise
- 2002–2010: Charleroi

Senior career*
Years	Team	Apps	(Gls)
2010–2011	Charleroi	1	(0)
2012–2014	Oud-Heverlee Leuven	13	(1)
2013–2014	→ Lommel United (loan)	29	(7)
2014–2015	Mons	31	(8)
2015–2018	Sparta Rotterdam	63	(23)
2018–2021	Beerschot	48	(7)
2021–2023	Zira	44	(5)
2023–2024	Sangiuliano City	18	(0)
2024–	Mons	48	(19)
- * Club domestic league appearances and goals as of 24 June 2026

Loris Brogno (born 18 September 1992) is a Belgian professional footballer who plays as a forward for Belgian National Division 1 club Mons.

== Career ==
Brogno started his professional career with Charleroi and played his first official match in the Belgian Pro League on 23 March 2011, replacing Massimo Bruno after 57 minutes in a 0–3 loss to Cercle Brugge. That year, Charleroi relegated to the Belgian Second Division and Brogno only seldom played any matches. As a result, he chose to move to newly promoted Oud-Heverlee Leuven during the 2011–12 winter transfer window, where his uncle Toni Brogno had also played before.

As soon as OH Leuven was clear of relegation, Brogno got some playing chances, scoring his first goal on 21 March 2012 in a 3–1 home win against Sint-Truiden. During the 2012–13 season, he appeared in 8 matches for OH Leuven, but to allow the youngster to get more playing time, Brogno was loaned out to Lommel United for the following season. After this season his contract with OH Leuven ended, allowing him to move to Mons. He played one season for Mons but was allowed to leave at the end of the 2014–15 season as Mons went bankrupt and folded. He signed for Sparta Rotterdam on 8 June 2015. After three seasons in the Netherlands with Sparta, Brogno signed for Beerschot Wilrijk in May 2018.

On 18 August 2021, he signed a two-year contract with Zira in Azerbaijan.

== Personal life ==
He is a son of Dante Brogno and a nephew of Toni Brogno, both footballers.

== Honours ==
Sparta Rotterdam

- Eerste Divisie: 2015–16
