= Union Rochefortoise =

Association football club in Belgium

- Nickname: les Marcassins (The Young Wild Boars)
- Founded: 3 May 1939; 87 years ago (as Royale Jeunesse Rochefortoise Football Club) matricule 2799
- Ground: Parc des Roches, Rochefort
- Capacity: 1,000
- Chairman: Nicolas Lhoist
- Manager: Jeffrey Rentmeister
- League: Belgian Division 1
- 2025–26: Belgian Division 1 FFA, 6th of 12
| Home colours | Away colours |

Union Rochefortoise is a Belgian football club based in Rochefort, Namur Province. The club currently competes in the Belgian Division 1, the third tier of Belgian football. It plays its home matches at the Parc des Roches, which has a capacity of approximately 1,000 spectators. The club's colours are blue and white.

== History ==
The club was founded on 3 May 1939 as Jeunesse Rochefortoise Football Club and was assigned matricule number 2799 by the Royal Belgian Football Association. Due to the outbreak of the World War II, the club's competitive debut was delayed. Following the war, Jeunesse Rochefortoise progressed through the provincial leagues, achieving promotion to the national divisions for the first time in 1963 after winning the Namur Provincial First Division. In their debut season in the Promotion (then the fourth tier), the club finished fifth. However, they were relegated the following season. Subsequent promotions in 1968 and 1970 also resulted in immediate relegations.

In 1987, the club was granted the "Royal" designation, becoming Royale Jeunesse Rochefortoise Football Club. A provincial title in 1990 facilitated a return to the national divisions. Throughout the 1990s, the club maintained a stable presence in the Promotion. Notably, in 1997 and 1998, the team finished fourth in their series, qualifying for the promotion play-offs to the Third Division on both occasions, though they did not secure promotion.

Following relegation in 2003, the club merged with FC Jemelle (matricule 7214) in 2008, forming Jeunesse Rochefortoise Jemelle Association. This merger aimed to consolidate resources and revive the club's fortunes. In 2016, the club reverted to the name Royale Jeunesse Rochefortoise FC.

In April 2020, a further merger with FC Éprave (matricule 7049) led to the formation of Union Rochefortoise. This merger also introduced new club colours—blue and white—replacing the traditional red and white. The newly formed club retained matricule 2799.

A turning point in the club's modern era came in 2018, when Nicolas Lhoist, a local entrepreneur and member of the prominent Lhoist family, known for their global lime and dolomite business, became actively involved in the club's management. Initially serving as vice-president alongside his brothers Jérôme and Arthur, Lhoist brought renewed ambition and investment to the club. Following the 2020 merger, he assumed the role of president. Under Lhoist's leadership, the club implemented a long-term vision focused on infrastructure, youth development, and competitive advancement. This included the development of a covered synthetic pitch and a planned youth academy, partially supported by public subsidies. The club has also explored proposals for a new stadium in Marche-en-Famenne, reflecting its growing regional ambitions.

After a 16-year absence from national football, Union Rochefortoise returned to the national divisions in 2019, securing promotion to Division 3 Amateur via the interprovincial play-offs. The 2020–21 season was annulled due to the COVID-19 pandemic. In the 2022–23 season, the club won the Division 3, earning promotion to Division 2. The following season, they achieved a second consecutive promotion, ascending to the third-tier Division 1 for the 2024–25 season.

== Honours ==
Union Rochefortoise
| Honour | No. | Years |
|---|---|---|
| Belgian Division 3 ACFF B | 1 | 2022–23 |
