= Tiemen Wijnen =

Belgian footballer

Personal information
- Date of birth: 2 May 2000 (age 26)
- Place of birth: Belgium
- Height: 1.75 m (5 ft 9 in)
- Position: Midfielder

Team information
- Current team: Belisia Bilzen
- Number: 10

Youth career
- –2018: Genk

Senior career*
Years	Team	Apps	(Gls)
2018–2019	Roda JC	1	(0)
2019–2020	Bilzerse Waltwilder		
2020–	Belisia Bilzen	155	(58)

International career
2016	Belgium U16	2	(1)
2017	Belgium U17	6	(0)
- * Club domestic league appearances and goals as of 3 May 2026

Tiemen Wijnen (born 2 May 2000) is a Belgian footballer who plays for Belisia Bilzen.

== Club career ==
He made his Eerste Divisie debut for Roda JC Kerkrade on 30 November 2018 in a game against TOP Oss as a 89th-minute substitute for Nicky Souren.
