= KVK Ninove =

Association football club in Brakel, Belgium

- Full name: Koninklijke Voetbal Klub Ninove
- Short name: Ninove
- Founded: 1936; 90 years ago
- Ground: De Kloppers, Ninove
- Capacity: 1,500
- Chairman: Patrick De Doncker
- Head coach: Alan Haydock
- League: Belgian National Division 1
- 2023–24: Division 2 VV A, 2nd of 18 (promoted)
- Website: https://www.kvkninove.be/
Home colours

KVK Ninove is a Belgian football club the club takes place in the beautiful city of Ninove. Registered with the Belgian FA under matricule 2373. The full name of the club is Koninklijke Voetbal Klub Ninove (Royal Football Club Ninove) and it has green and black as club colours. The club has played for over three decades at the national level. The club set to play in Belgian National Division 1 from 2024–25 after promotion from Belgian Division 2 in 2023–24.

== History ==
Already early on in the 20th century, football was organized in Ninove. Around 1908 a city team took part in a local Denderstreek league with teams from neighbouring cities. From 1913 to 1923 the club played under the name Sporting Football Club Ninove, abbreviated as SFC Ninove (with matricule 176). This club dissolved however, with only a few company teams remaining, such as those linked to the factories of Union Allumettière and Fabelta.

Eventually, on 22 March 1936 the current club joined the Belgian FA under the name FC Ninove. Matricule 2373 was awarded and the club chose green and black as club colours, starting in the Belgian Provincial Leagues. Gradually, the club rose through the ranks, reaching the national level for the first time in 1956. That first season, Ninove immediately achieved the fourth place in the Belgian Fourth Division and continued in the following years mostly finishing either just below the top teams or in the middle of the pack. In 1966 however, the club finished second-to-last, dropping back into the provincial leagues, where it remained for several years and during that time the club name was changed to Flemish as VK Ninove.

In 1972, the club relocated closer to Aalst due to construction of a new road, which required leaving complex Den Doorn at the north of Ninove and taking up camp instead at De Kloppers located somewhat more south in Meerbeke. In 1975 the club was able to return to the Belgian Fourth Division, but struggled initially, only returning to the top of the division toward the end of the 1970s, eventually becoming runners-up in 1981 behind Merchtem. That season Merchtem was penalized for bribery and forced to relegate, allowing Ninove to be promoted instead, moving for the first time ever into the Belgian Third Division.

VK Ninove was able to maintain well at this level, often ending in the middle of the table, once even second in 1984. Towards the end of the 1980s the club struggled again, narrowly avoiding relegation in 1989 and 1990 but eventually going down in 1991. In the meantime upon its 50th year of existence, the club had changed its name to KVK Ninove, adding the royal designation Koninklijke to its name. This did not help the results however, as the club hovered between the bottom national and top provincial level for many years, dropping in 1993, rising in 1997 and dropping again in 2002. The struggle continued, with the club even dropping to the second provincial level for some seasons, before starting a more successful period from 2013, achieving promotions in 2013, 2015, 2019 and 2020 to end up at its current level, the Belgian Division 2.

In 2023–24, Ninove secure promotion to Belgian National Division 1 after finishing runner-up in Belgian Division 2 VV A due to S.C. Eendracht Aalst as Champions did not license to Belgian third tier and return to third tier after a year absence. There is a chant thats named KVK Je moeder Ja.

== Honours ==
- Belgian Division 2
  - Runner-up (1): 2023–24

== Current squad ==
As of 1 March 2026

Note: Flags indicate national team as defined under FIFA eligibility rules; some limited exceptions apply. Players may hold more than one non-FIFA nationality.

No.	Pos.	Nation	Player
1	GK	BEL	Wout Van der Perren
3	DF	BEL	Yari Verbeken
6	MF	BEL	Adam Zaânan
7	MF	BEL	Lorenzo De Geyndt
9	FW	BEL	Senda Mukandila
10	MF	BEL	Dario Oger
12	DF	BEL	Jari De Vriendt
13	DF	BEL	Maxim Meert
14	FW	UKR	Andriy Vieru
15	DF	BEL	Arno Lemable
16	DF	BEL	Gilles Vandecandelaere

No.	Pos.	Nation	Player
18	DF	BEL	Gilles Denayer
19	FW	BEL	Joachim Ngongo
22	DF	BEL	Lorenzo Matarrese
25	GK	BEL	Syben Bellemans
33	DF	BEL	Esteban Achlak
35	DF	BEL	Rudy Chirishungu
77	MF	BEL	Adam Karmaoui
79	MF	BEL	Nathan De Raes
80	DF	BEL	Elias Van Den Borre
94	FW	CMR	Dibola Junior
