= RAEC Mons (2015) =

Belgian football club

- Full name: Renaissance Albert Élisabeth Club de Mons
- Nicknames: Les Dragons (The Dragons); L'Albert (The Albert)
- Founded: 15 January 1945; 81 years ago as AS Quévy-le-Grand et Extensions; February 2015; 11 years ago as Royal Albert Quévy-Mons 23 June 2020; 6 years ago as Renaissance Mons 44
- Ground: Stade Charles Tondreau, Mons
- Capacity: 8,000
- Chairman: Hubert Ewbank; Frédéric Herpoel
- Manager: Frederik D'Hollander (interim)
- League: Belgian Division 1
- 2025–26: Belgian Division 1 FFA, 2nd (play-offs)
- Website: www.raecmons44.be
Home colours	Away colours

Renaissance Albert Élisabeth Club de Mons, commonly known as RAEC Mons, is a Belgian football club based in Mons, Hainaut Province, Wallonia. Founded on 15 January 1945 as AS Quévy-le-Grand et Extensions, and reformed after bankruptcy in 2015, the club is nicknamed the Dragons, a reference to the legend of the Ducasse de Mons. RAEC Mons compete in the Belgian Division 1, the third tier of Belgian football.

== History ==
The first club created in Quévy-le-Grand was Cercle Sportif de Quévy-le-Grand in 1928, which played in blue and yellow but dissolved only a few years later in 1934. The actual official foundation of the club therefore is 15 January 1945, when AS Quévy-le-Grand et Extensions was created, joining the Belgian FA and starting to play in the Belgian Provincial Leagues, again in blue and yellow.

In 1989, the club merged with the neighbouring FC Genly-Noirchain to form Union Sportive Genly-Quévy 89, changing its colours to orange and blue. The club obtained royal patronage upon its 50th year of existence in 1995, becoming RUS Genly-Quévy. Until that point, the club had played at the lowest levels of Belgian football, but from then on started moving up the ladder, especially in the early years of the 21st century. In 2007 the club promoted to the second provincial division, in 2009 to the first provincial division and in 2012 the club even reached the national level of Belgian football for the first time ever, moving into the Belgian Fourth Division. The club was able to maintain itself only for two seasons however, dropping back in 2014.

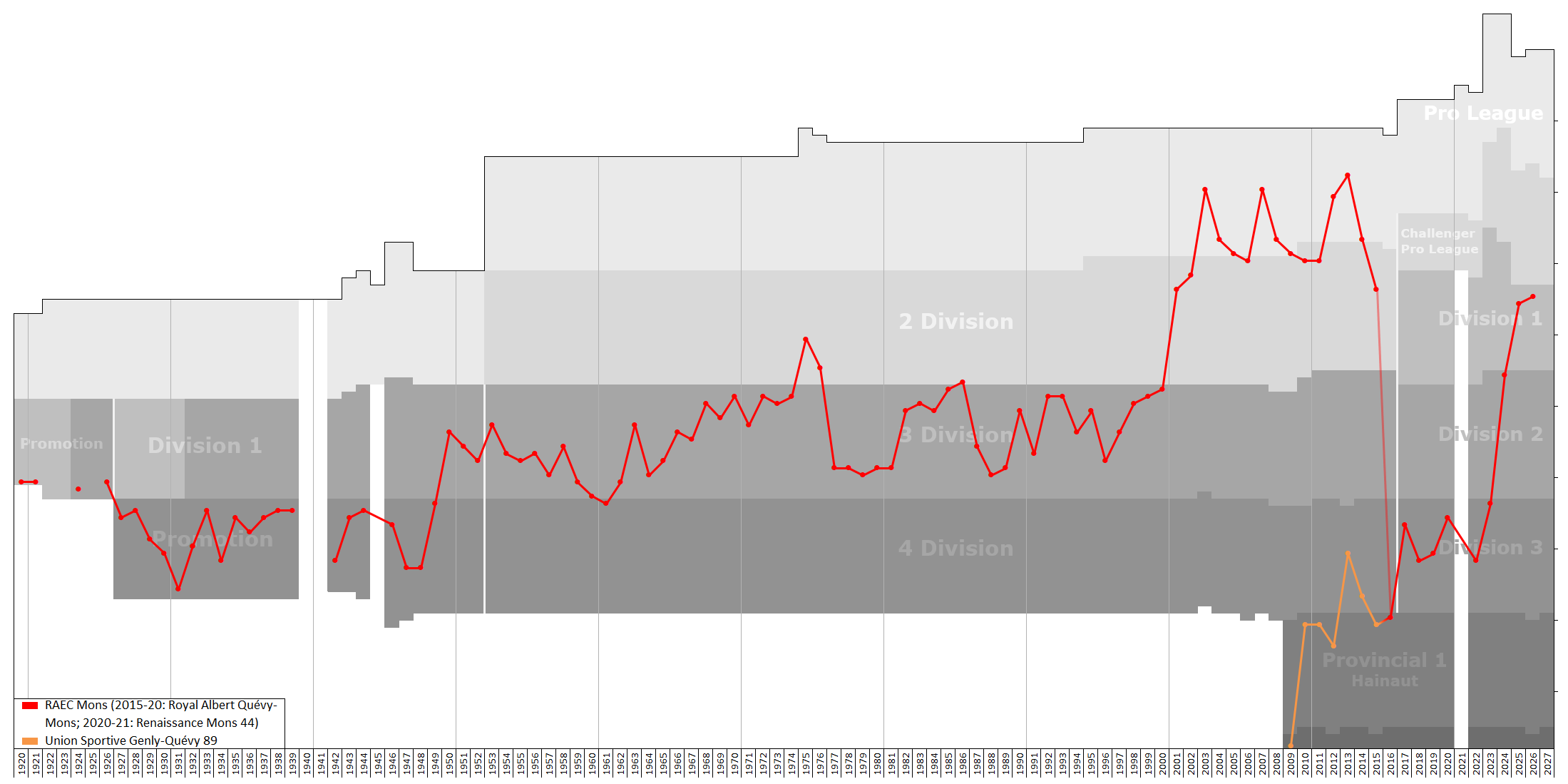
Historical chart of RAEC Mons league performance

=== Bankruptcy formerly RAEC Mons and current of Phoenix club ===
In February 2015, the neighbouring team RAEC Mons went bankrupt and folded, with the remaining parts of the club merging with RUS Genly-Quévy 89 to form Royal Albert Quévy-Mons and relocating from Quévy to Mons. On 23 June 2020, the club was renamed to Renaissance Mons 44, following an initiative from RAEC Mons supporters. From the 2021–22 season on, the club hoped to reclaim the former matricule 44 of RAEC Mons and also reverted to the former name.

=== Promotion two consecutive seasons ===
On 16 April 2023, Mons secured promotion to Belgian Division 2 from 2023–24 after defeating Crossing Schaerbeek 3-1 and becoming champions of Belgian Division 3 ACFF A in 2022–23.

On 13 April 2024, Mons secured consecutive promotions, moving to Belgian National Division 1 after defeating Stade Vervietois 3-1 and becoming champions of Belgian Division 2 ACFF in 2023–24.

=== New ownership and return of matricule 44 ===
In August 2025, Peter Gould and Charlie Methven, owner and general manager of Mount Pleasant F.A. respectively, acquired a majority stake in R.A.E.C. Mons.

On 18 August 2025, George Boateng was appointed head coach on a three-year contract. In his first season, Mons contested the title in the 2025–26 Division 1 FFA play-offs, finishing second, three points behind champions Virton, who won promotion to the Challenger Pro League.

On 8 July 2026, at its season presentation at the Stade Charles Tondreau, the club officially announced that it had recovered the historic matricule 44 of the former RAEC Mons, eleven years after that club's bankruptcy. The recovery followed a supporter-backed fundraising campaign launched in 2025 and was completed with the support of majority shareholder Gould.

On 8 October 2026, the club announced that it had parted ways with Boateng, citing results below its expectations, and placed Frederik D'Hollander in interim charge of the first team.

== Stadium ==
RAEC Mons plays in the Stade Charles Tondreau with 8,000-capacity.

== Players ==
=== Current squad ===
As of 5 February, 2026. Note: Flags indicate national team as defined under FIFA eligibility rules; some limited exceptions apply. Players may hold more than one non-FIFA nationality.

No.	Pos.	Nation	Player
1	GK	BEL	Arno Valkenaers
2	DF	NED	Bradley de Nooijer
4	DF	BEL	David Mindombe
5	DF	BEL	Dylan Ragolle
6	DF	JAM	Romain Blake
7	FW	BEL	Loris Brogno
8	MF	BEL	Thomas Vanhecke
9	FW	COD	Mayingila Nzuzi Mata
10	FW	FRA	Yacine Bentayeb
14	DF	JAM	Sue-Lae McCalla
17	FW	BEL	Dylan De Belder
18	DF	FRA	Tibère Bridoux
20	MF	FRA	Zakaria Nadrani

No.	Pos.	Nation	Player
21	FW	CPV	Gianni dos Santos
23	MF	BEL	Allan Tshimanga
24	MF	BEL	Florian Maes
26	DF	CMR	Raoul Kenne (on loan from Patro Eisden Maasmechelen)
27	GK	BEL	Maxime Vandermeulen
28	MF	BEL	Antoine De Bodt
45	FW	COD	Leslie Lubelu
48	MF	BEL	Lars Montegnies
55	DF	BEL	Cederick Van Daele
62	DF	FRA	Axel Benoît
81	GK	BEL	Henri Maton
93	FW	GER	Victor Gorny
97	DF	BEL	Jordan Dauchy

== Honours ==
- Belgian Division 2
  - Champions (1): 2023–24
- Belgian Division 3
  - Champions (1) : 2022–23
