= 2026–27 Belgian Cup =

Croky Cup

Tournament details
- Country: Belgium
- Dates: 26 July 2026 – TBA 2027
- Teams: 277

The 2026–27 Belgian Cup, called the Croky Cup for sponsorship reasons, is the 72nd season of Belgium's annual football cup competition. The competition began on 26 July 2026. The winners of the competition will qualify for the 2027–28 UEFA Europa League. Union SG are the defending champions. Match times are CEST (UTC+2) during the summer and CET (UTC+1) during the winter.

== Teams, dates and regulations ==
The Belgian Cup is a knockout competition with 277 teams taking part, all trying to reach the final at the Koning Boudewijn Stadium in May 2027. All rounds are single-match elimination rounds, except for the semi-finals. When tied after 90 minutes in the first three rounds, penalties will be taken immediately. From round four onwards, when tied after 90 minutes first an extra time period of 30 minutes will be played, then penalties are to be taken if still necessary.

Round	Draw date	Main date (Sundays, or Thursdays if mid-week)	Number of fixtures	Clubs remaining	New entries this round	Divisions entering this round
First round	24 June 2026	26 July 2026	58	277 → 219	116	Belgian Provincial Leagues
Second round	24 June 2026	2 August 2026	61	219 → 158	64	Belgian Division 3
Third round	24 June 2026	9 August 2026	53	158 → 105	45	Belgian Division 2
Fourth round	24 June 2026	16 August 2026	38	105 → 67	23	Belgian Division 1
Fifth round	24 June 2026	23 August 2026	19	67 → 48	None	None
Sixth round	24 June 2026	27 September 2026	16	48 → 32	13	11 Challenger Pro League teams 2 Belgian Pro League teams
Seventh round	28 September 2026	18 October 2026	14	32 → 16	16	16 Belgian Pro League teams
Eighth round	18 October 2026	6 December 2026	8	16 → 8	None	None
Quarter-finals	TBA	4 February 2027	4	8 → 4	None	None
Semi-finals	TBA	4 March 2027 (1st leg)	2	4 → 2	None	None
Semi-finals	TBA	22 April 2027 (2nd leg)	2	4 → 2	None	None
Final	TBA	TBA	1	2 → 1	None	None

== First round ==
This round of matches is scheduled to be played on 26 July 2026. It features 116 teams from the provincial leagues.

number of eligible teams per tier (U23-teams cannot participate) still in competition
Pro League	Challenger Pro League	Division 1	Division 2	Division 3	Provincial Leagues	Total
18 / 18	11 / 11	23 / 23	45 / 45	64 / 64	116 / 116	277 / 277

Tie	Home team	Score	Away team
1	Bevel	1–1 (4–5 p)	Zandhoven
2	Wijnegem	1–3	Duffel
3	Zwarte Leeuw	1–2	Dessel B
4	Merksplas	1–1 (16–17 p)	Witgoor Sport
5	Excelsior Bouwel	2–1	Leest
6	Kontich	5–0	Kessel United
7	Huizingen	0–4	Bierbeek
8	Haren	0–3	Wolvertem Merchtem
9	Teralfene	7–0	Boutersem United
10	Liedekerke	0–1	Fenixx Beigem Humbeek
11	Plenke Werchter	1–1 (5–4 p)	Schepdaal
12	Zuun	1–1 (4–3 p)	Wijgmaal
13	Hoeselt	2–4	Weerstand Koersel
14	Turkse Beringen	0–2	Eendracht Mechelen a/d Maas B
15	Torpedo Hasselt	5–0	Biesen B
16	Wezel Sport B	3–1	Linkhout
17	RWL Sport	2–3	St-Elen
18	Kaulille	0–2	Heide Hasselt
19	Munkzwalm	2–1	Heikant Zele
20	Vrasene	0–1	Eendracht Aalter
21	Eeklo	2–0	St-Maria-Horebeke
22	St-Martens-Latem	1–2	KSK Beveren
23	Berlare	2–2 (3–4 p)	Thor Kokerij-Meldert
24	Svelta Melsele	1–1 (3–4 p)	Borsbeke
25	Herleving Haasdonk	3–0	Elene Grotenberge B
26	Aalbeke Sport	2–0	Wielsbeke
27	Sassport Boezinge	3–3 (6–5 p)	Zonnebeke
28	Jabbeke B	1–5	Jong Male
29	Bissegem	7–1	Eendracht Wervik

Tie	Home team	Score	Away team
30	Club Roeselare	3–3 (2–4 p)	Marke
31	Beveren-Leie	3–1	Knesselare
32	Waterloo	3–1	Genappe
33	Saintoise	3–0	Enghiennois
34	Boitsfort	5–1	Jodoigne
35	Lasne Ohain	0–3	Etterbeek
36	Ransartoise	0–5	Etoiles d'Ere
37	Mont-s-Marchienne-College	0–5	Rapid Symphorinois
38	Luingnois	4–1	J.S. Thudinienne
39	Bleharies	1–1 (4–2 p)	Courcelloise
40	Rongy	2–5	Pays Blanc Antoinien
41	Peruwelz	5–1	Mominoise
42	Haine-Saint-Pierre	1–3	Gosselies Sports
43	Grand-Leez B	1–4	Grand-Leez
44	Ligny	1–2	Meux B
45	Bossiere Gembloux	2–0	Petit-Waret
46	Nismes	0–1	Chevetogne
47	Naninnois	4–1	Espoir Tarciennois
48	Lontzen	1–2	Trooz
49	Wanze/Bas-Oha	6–4	Croatia Wandre
50	Warsage	2–2 (4–3 p)	Fizoise
51	Blegnytoise B	1–1 (9–10 p)	Burdinnois
52	Templiers-Nandrin	4–1	Limbourg
53	Grivegnee	2–1	Seraing Athletique
54	Houffaloise	4–3	Wallonia Libin
55	Oppagne-Weris	2–4	Harre-Manhay
56	Marloie Sport	2–2 (6–5 p)	Assenois
57	Rapid Oudler	3–2	Nothomb-Post
58	Anthisnois	2–4	Bastogne

== Second round ==
This round is scheduled to be played on 2 August 2026. The 58 winners from the first round are joined by 64 clubs from the Division 3.

number of eligible teams per tier (U23-teams cannot participate) still in competition
Pro League	Challenger Pro League	Division 1	Division 2	Division 3	Provincial Leagues	Total
18 / 18	11 / 11	23 / 23	45 / 45	64 / 64	58 / 116	219 / 277

Tie	Home team	Score	Away team
59	Kontich	0–1	Berg en Dal (5)
60	Zepperen-Brustem (5)	8–0	Excelsior Bouwel
61	Geel (5)	4–0	Lille United (5)
62	Teralfene	1–6	Wezel Sport (5)
63	Fenixx Beigem Humbeek	1–0	Esperanza Pelt (5)
64	Turnhout (5)	2–0	Wolvertem Merchtem
65	Bree-Beek (5)	4–0	Plenke Werchter
66	Sint-Lenaarts (5)	2–1	Bierbeek
67	Dessel B	1–2	Nieuwmoer (5)
68	City Pirates (5)	4–2	Duffel
69	Zuun	0–8	Schoonbeek-Beverst (5)
70	Zandhoven	2–3	Averbode Testelt Okselaar (5)
71	Achel (5)	0–1	Witgoor Sport
72	Borsbeke	0–2	Gullegem (5)
73	St-Elen	1–6	Ieper (5)
74	Eendracht Aalter	0–3	Erpe-Mere United (5)
75	Torpedo Hasselt	1–2	Avanti Stekene (5)
76	Rumbeke (5)	2–1	Weerstand Koersel
77	Munkzwalm	2–1	Drongen (5)
78	KSK Beveren	1–4	Blankenberge (5)
79	Olsa Brakel (5)	3–1	Thor Kokerij-Meldert
80	Eendracht Mechelen a/d Maas B	1–4	Elene Grotenberge (5)
81	Wezel Sport B	2–1	Zwevegem Sport (5)
82	Club Lauwe (5)	2–1	Heide Hasselt
83	Herleving Haasdonk	2–2 (4–1 p)	Berchem Sport (5)
84	St-Denijs Sport (5)	1–0	Eeklo
85	Léopold (5)	1–0	Bissegem
86	Etterbeek	3–1	Stade Everois (5)
87	Marke	0–1	Betekom (5)
88	Beveren-Leie	1–3	Kosova Schaerbeek (5)
89	Saintoise	4–1	Elewijt (5)

Tie	Home team	Score	Away team
90	Saint-Michel (5)	2–0	Boitsfort
91	Huldenberg (5)	2–3	Waterloo
92	Sporting Bruxelles (5)	1–1 (3–2 p)	Sassport Boezinge
93	Linden (5)	3–0	Aalbeke Sport
94	Jong Male	2–3	Wambeek Ternat (5)
95	Biesme (5)	0–0 (10–9 p)	Luingnois
96	Etoiles d'Ere	2–2 (4–1 p)	Andenne Evelette (5)
97	Verlaine (5)	16–0	Bleharies
98	Bossiere Gembloux	1–5	Soignies Sports (5)
99	Peruwelz	2–1	Molenbaix (5)
100	Ciney (5)	3–1	Grand-Leez
101	Rochefort B (5)	7–0	Pays Blanc Antoinien
102	Rapid Symphorinois	2–2 (5–6 p)	Jemappes (5)
103	Monceau (5)	0–3	Gosselies Sports
104	Néchin (5)	3–0	Chevetogne
105	Naninnois	3–2	Arquet (5)
106	Meux B	2–2 (2–4 p)	Pont-A-Celles-Buzet (5)
107	Mormont (5)	1–0	Houffaloise
108	Sprimont (5)	0–1	Malmundaria (5)
109	Marloie Sport	1–1 (5–3 p)	Momalloise (5)
110	Libramontois (5)	0–3	Elsautoise (5)
111	Messancy (5)	2–1	Wanze/Bas-Oha
112	Harre-Manhay	1–0	Du Geer (5)
113	Waremmien (5)	4–3	Grivegnee
114	Aubel (5)	6–0	Trooz
115	Habay-la-Neuve B (5)	2–0	Templiers-Nandrin
116	Warsage	0–4	Tilffois (5)
117	Marloie Sport B	0–0 (2–4 p)	Longlier (5)
118	Burdinnois	2–2 (4–5 p)	Ans (5)
119	Rapid Oudler	2–2 (6–7 p)	Meix Dt-Virton (5)

== Third round ==
This round is scheduled to be played on 9 August 2026. The 61 winners from the second round are joined by 45 clubs from the Division 2.

number of eligible teams per tier (U23-teams cannot participate) still in competition
Pro League	Challenger Pro League	Division 1	Division 2	Division 3	Provincial Leagues	Total
18 / 18	11 / 11	23 / 23	45 / 45	47 / 64	14 / 116	158 / 277

Tie	Home team	Score	Away team
120	Harre-Manhay	2–1	Witgoor Sport
121	Wellen (4)	5–3	Waterloo
122	Saintoise	1–2	Eendracht Termien (4)
123	Eendracht Aalst Lede (4)	4–1	Sint-Lenaarts (5)
124	Ans (5)	0–2	City Pirates (5)
125	Malmundaria (5)	0–1	Rumbeke (5)
126	Saint-Michel (5)	2–0	Pont-A-Celles-Buzet (5)
127	Geel (5)	0–0 (2–4 p)	Bocholt (4)
128	Sporting Bruxelles (5)	0–3	De Kempen (4)
129	Sportief Rotselaar (4)	1–1 (8–7 p)	Wezel Sport (5)
130	Acren Lessines (4)	3–1	Etoiles d'Ere
131	Olsa Brakel (5)	2–2 (3–4 p)	Aubel (5)
132	Fenixx Beigem Humbeek	2–1	Naninnois
133	Nijlen (4)	1–1 (7–6 p)	Zepperen-Brustem (5)
134	Elsautoise (5)	4–2	Hades Kiewit Hasselt (4)
135	Cappellen (4)	3–1	Rochefort B (5)
136	Berg en Dal (5)	3–3 (3–2 p)	Aywaille (4)
137	Etterbeek	3–5	Lebbeke (4)
138	Peruwelz	0–2	Munkzwalm
139	Messancy (5)	1–1 (3–4 p)	Nieuwmoer (5)
140	Tongeren (4)	6–0	Jemappes (5)
141	Diksmuide-Oostende (4)	6–0	Avanti Stekene (5)
142	Wetteren (4)	2–1	Herleving Haasdonk
143	Habay-la-Neuve B (5)	0–0 (2–4 p)	St-Ghislain Tertre-Hautrage (4)
144	United Richelle (4)	4–3	Gullegem (5)
145	Club Lauwe (5)	0–1	Hamme (4)
146	Tempo Overijse (4)	4–2	Ieper (5)

Tie	Home team	Score	Away team
147	Longlier (5)	0–3	Petegem (4)
148	Ostiches-Ath (4)	2–1	Wezel Sport B
149	Soignies Sports (5)	0–1	Ninove (4)
150	KRC Mechelen (4)	6–1	Tilff (5)
151	Ganshoren (4)	3–3 (2–4 p)	Waremmien (5)
152	Biesme (5)	0–6	Oostkamp (4)
153	Verlaine (5)	1–0	Wilrijk (4)
154	Hoger Op Kalken (4)	2–1	Ciney (5)
155	Stade Vervietois (4)	1–1 (5–4 p)	Erpe-Mere United (5)
156	La Calamine (4)	5–0	Gosselies Sports
157	Wambeek Ternat (5)	1–1 (3–5 p)	Stade Mouscronnois (4)
158	Entite Manageoise (4)	1–1 (2–3 p)	Meix Dt-Virton (5)
159	Londerzeel (4)	6–2	Linden (5)
160	Bree-Beek (5)	5–0 FF	KRC Gent (4)
161	Rupel Boom (4)	2–1	Turnhout (5)
162	Crossing Schaerbeek (4)	1–0	Betekom (5)
163	Mormont (5)	1–3	Torhout (4)
164	Jette (4)	1–5	St-Denijs Sport (5)
165	Voorde-Appelterre (4)	4–2	Averbode Testelt Okselaar (5)
166	Schoonbeek-Beverst (5)	5–3	Oudenaarde (4)
167	Léopold (5)	0–2	Diegem (4)
168	Braine (4)	3–2	Elene Grotenberge (5)
169	Néchin (5)	2–3	Stockay (4)
170	Kosova Schaerbeek (5)	1–1 (4–3 p)	Namur (4)
171	Marloie Sport	0–4	Union Hutoise (4)
172	Blankenberge (5)	2–2	Binche (4)

== Fourth round ==
This round is scheduled to be played on 16 August 2026. The 53 winners from the third round are joined by 23 clubs from the Division 1.

number of eligible teams per tier (U23-teams cannot participate) still in competition
Pro League	Challenger Pro League	Division 1	Division 2	Division 3	Provincial Leagues	Total
18 / 18	11 / 11	23 / 23	36 / 45	14 / 64	3 / 116	105 / 277

Tie	Home team	Score	Away team
173	Flénu (3)	4–1	St-Ghislain Tertre-Hautrage (4)
174	Rupel Boom (4)	1–0	Acren Lessines (4)
175	Harre-Manhay	0–2	Londerzeel (4)
176	De Kempen (4)	3–1	Saint-Michel (5)
177	Hamme (4)	3–2 (a.e.t.)	Munkzwalm
178	Berg en Dal (5)	4–3	Sportief Rotselaar (4)
179	Zelzate (3)	3–2	Braine (4)
180	Merelbeke (3)	5–2	Ninove (4)
181	Eendracht Aalst Lede (4)	2–1	Union Hutoise (4)
182	Stade Vervietois (4)	1–0	Tienen (3)
183	Dessel (3)	5–3	United Richelle (4)
184	Stockay (4)	1–0 (a.e.t.)	Nieuwmoer (5)
185	Tongeren (4)	2–1	Kosova Schaerbeek (5)
186	Habay-la-Neuve (3)	0–0 (4–2 p)	La Calamine (4)
187	Blankenberge (5)	1–1 (4–5 p)	Houtvenne (3)
188	Lyra-Lierse (3)	1–2	Wellen (4)
189	Hoogstraten (3)	7–2	Stade Mouscronnois (4)
190	Onhaye (3)	2–1	Voorde-Appelterre (4)
191	Rochefort (3)	6–0	Ostiches-Ath (4)

Tie	Home team	Score	Away team
192	Crossing Schaerbeek (4)	3–1	Harelbeke (3)
193	Mandel United (3)	7–0	Waremmien (5)
194	Olympic Charleroi (3)	2–0	Hoger Op Kalken (4)
195	Nijlen (4)	2–2 (4–3 p)	Wetteren (4)
196	Mons (3)	5–0	Schoonbeek-Beverst (5)
197	St-Denijs Sport (5)	1–1 (3–4 p)	Verlaine (5)
198	Bree-Beek (5)	0–4	Heist (3)
199	Rumbeke (5)	1–1 (5–4 p)	Fenixx Beigem Humbeek
200	Tempo Overijse (4)	1–2	Thes (3)
201	Torhout (4)	0–1	Knokke (3)
202	City Pirates (5)	0–6	Diksmuide-Oostende (4)
203	Bocholt (4)	0–0 (2–3 p)	Diegem (4)
204	Meix Dt-Virton (5)	0–4	Belisia Bilzen (3)
205	Lebbeke (4)	1–4	Oostkamp (4)
206	Cappellen (4)	2–1	Elsautoise (5)
207	Eendracht Termien (4)	0–1	Tubize-Braine (3)
208	RWDM Brussels (3)	6–0	Aubel (5)
209	KRC Mechelen (4)	0–2	Roeselare (3)
210	Meux (3)	2–0	Petegem (4)

== Fifth round ==
This round is scheduled to be played on 23 August 2026 and features the 38 winners from the previous round.

number of eligible teams per tier (U23-teams cannot participate) still in competition
Pro League	Challenger Pro League	Division 1	Division 2	Division 3	Provincial Leagues	Total
18 / 18	11 / 11	20 / 23	15 / 45	3 / 64	0 / 116	67 / 277

Tie	Home team	Score	Away team
211	De Kempen (4)	0–3	Roeselare (3)
212	Rumbeke (5)	2–3	Houtvenne (3)
213	Merelbeke (3)	2–1	Stade Vervietois (4)
214	Oostkamp (4)	1–0	Meux (3)
215	Londerzeel (4)	2–0	Cappellen (4)
216	Rochefort (3)	3–0	Belisia Bilzen (3)
217	Heist (3)	2–1	Tongeren (4)
218	Diegem (4)	4–2	Verlaine (5)
219	Mandel United (3)	4–2	Eendracht Aalst Lede (4)
220	Nijlen (4)	2–1	Flénu (3)

Tie	Home team	Score	Away team
221	Crossing Schaerbeek (4)	5–0	Stockay (4)
222	Hamme (4)	1–2	Hoogstraten (3)
223	Thes (3)	0–2	Olympic Charleroi (3)
224	Knokke (3)	3–0	Dessel (3)
225	Tubize-Braine (3)	1–2	Rupel Boom (4)
226	Onhaye (3)	1–2	Habay-la-Neuve (3)
227	Wellen (4)	2–2 (6–5 p)	Berg en Dal (5)
228	RWDM Brussels (3)	1–3 (a.e.t.)	Diksmuide-Oostende (4)
229	Mons (3)	3–0	Zelzate (3)

== Sixth round ==
This round is scheduled to be played on 27 September 2026 and features the 19 winners from the previous round, joined by the 11 eligible clubs from the Challenger Pro League and two teams from the Pro League (Kortrijk and Lommel).

number of eligible teams per tier (U23-teams cannot participate) still in competition
Pro League	Challenger Pro League	Division 1	Division 2	Division 3	Provincial Leagues	Total
16 / 18	11 / 11	11 / 23	8 / 45	0 / 64	0 / 116	48 / 277

Tie	Home team	Score	Away team
230	Merelbeke (3)	0–1	Eupen (2)
231	Nijlen (4)	3–1	Rupel Boom (4)
232	Lokeren (2)	5–0 (Note: Houtvenne was initially drawn at home but agreed to play away.)	Houtvenne (3)
233	Diegem (4)	0–1 (a.e.t.)	Francs Borains (2)
234	Roeselare (3)	1–2	Patro Eisden Maasmechelen (2)
235	Olympic Charleroi (3)	1–1 (2–3 p)	Habay-la-Neuve (3)
236	Diksmuide-Oostende (4)	0–2	Lommel (1)
237	Londerzeel (4)	0–4	Mons (3)

Tie	Home team	Score	Away team
238	Heist (3)	2–2 (5–4 p)	Kortrijk (1)
239	Knokke (3)	2–5	Seraing (2)
240	Hoogstraten (3)	0–6	Dender EH (2)
241	RFC Liège (2)	4–1 (Note: Wellen was initially drawn at home but agreed to play away.)	Wellen (4)
242	Rochefort (3)	3–2	Lierse (2)
243	Oostkamp (4)	0–3	Virton (2)
244	Crossing Schaerbeek (4)	3–5	Beerschot (2)
245	Mandel United (3)	1–3	Hasselt (2)

26 September 2026	Londerzeel (4)	0–4	Mons (3)	Londerzeel
18:00 CEST		Report	Inaka 39'; Joossens 50' (o.g.); Dauchy 62'; Nadrani 80'	Stadium: Eeckelaers Stadion

26 September 2026	Diegem (4)	0–1 (a.e.t.)	Francs Borains (2)	Diegem
18:00 CEST		Report	Nioule 118'	Stadium: Gemeentelijk Sportstadion

26 September 2026	Oostkamp (4)	0–3	Virton (2)	Oostkamp
19:30 CEST		Report	Tormin 22', 69'; Wade 54'	Stadium: Stadion De Valkaart

26 September 2026	Lokeren (2)	5–0	Houtvenne (3)	Lokeren
20:00 CEST	Van Aerschot 17', 32', 56', 58'; Duku 74'	Report		Stadium: Daknamstadion

26 September 2026	Diksmuide-Oostende (4)	0–2	Lommel (1)	Ostend
20:00 CEST		Report	Reyners 31'; Schoofs 50'	Stadium: Batimont Solar Park

26 September 2026	Heist (3)	2–2 (a.e.t.) (5–4 p)	Kortrijk (1)	Heist-op-den-Berg
20:00 CEST	Mokam 61'; Epolo 90'	Report	Ambrose 11'; Podgoreanu 74'	Stadium: Omodo Jaecoo Sportpark
	Penalties
	Mokam (penalty missed); Epolo (penalty scored); El Banouhi (penalty scored); Zoete (penalty missed); Goossens (penalty scored); Ferrera (penalty scored); Schodts (penalty scored)		(penalty scored) Podgoreanu; (penalty missed) Lambert; (penalty missed) Mehssatou; (penalty scored) Van Landschoot; (penalty scored) Ambrose; (penalty scored) Anderson; (penalty missed) Murray-Campbell

26 September 2026	Hoogstraten (3)	0–6	Dender EH (2)	Hoogstraten
20:00 CEST		Report	Kestens 12'; Vandeplas 25', 32', 65'; Breugelmans 27'; Jullien 49'	Stadium: Sportcomplex Seminarie

26 September 2026	Mandel United (3)	1–3	Hasselt (2)	Izegem
20:00 CEST	A. Desot 48'	Report	Matoka 31'; Milts 90+1'; Bounou 90+3'	Stadium: Skyline Arena

26 September 2026	Roeselare (3)	1–2	Patro Eisden Maasmechelen (2)	Roeselare
20:00 CEST	Cassaert 71'	Report	Borry 45', 90+3'	Stadium: Schiervelde Stadion

26 September 2026	Nijlen (4)	3–1	Rupel Boom (4)	Nijlen
20:00 CEST	Quirynen 6'; Coeckelbergs 33'; Volkaerts 68'	Report	Zeroual 39'	Stadium: Campus KFC Nijlen

26 September 2026	Olympic Charleroi (3)	1–1 (a.e.t.) (2–3 p)	Habay-la-Neuve (3)	Charleroi
20:00 CEST	Sylla 26'	Report	Azouazi 57'	Stadium: Stade de la Neuville
	Penalties
	Calant (penalty missed); Crame (penalty scored); Moulhi (penalty missed); Ephestion (penalty scored); Benoît (penalty missed)		(penalty missed) Lempereur; (penalty scored) Azouazi; (penalty scored) Vandaele; (penalty scored) Ayala

27 September 2026	Merelbeke (3)	0–1	Eupen (2)	Merelbeke
16:00 CEST		Report	Delaurier-Chaubet 71'	Stadium: Sportpark Molenkouter

27 September 2026	Knokke (3)	2–5	Seraing (2)	Knokke
16:00 CEST	Mbega 66'; Colman 86'	Report	Messoussa 3', 16', 56'; Namri 9'; Lockman 57'	Stadium: Burgemeester Graaf Leopold Lippens Park

27 September 2026	Crossing Schaerbeek (4)	3–5	Beerschot (2)	Schaerbeek
16:00 CEST	Electeur 22'; Bitsindou 28'; Kumbi 52'	Report	Magidigidi 11'; Gyamfi 18'; Van Den Eynden 33' (pen.); Claes 37'; Van Eenoo 88'	Stadium: Stade communal de Schaerbeek

27 September 2026	Rochefort (3)	3–2	Lierse (2)	Rochefort
16:00 CEST	Cornet 73', 86'; Libert 75'	Report	El Touille 9'; Dwomoh 30'	Stadium: Stade du Parc des Roches

27 September 2026	RFC Liège (2)	4–1	Wellen (4)	Liège
16:00 CEST	Hazard 26'; D'Ostilio 41'; Bruggeman 55'; N'Salambi 80'	Report	Okoka Saka 89'	Stadium: Stade de Rocourt

== Seventh round ==
This round will feature the 16 winners from the previous round together with the remaining 16 teams from the Pro League, who enter at this stage. The 16 Pro League teams entering at this stage are seeded and cannot be drawn together, and any non-professional team (tier 3 and below) will always receive home advantge, unless their ground does not meet the eligibility criteria. The latter was the case for Habay-la-Neuve and Nijlen who were thus already certain of playing away prior to the draw.

number of eligible teams per tier (U23-teams cannot participate) still in competition
Pro League	Challenger Pro League	Division 1	Division 2	Division 3	Provincial Leagues	Total
17 / 18	10 / 11	4 / 23	1 / 45	0 / 64	0 / 116	32 / 277

16 October 2026	Westerlo (1)	2–0	Patro Eisden Maasmechelen (2)	Westerlo
20:30 CEST	Sandra 44'; Saito 75'	Report		Stadium: Het Kuipje; Referee: Jasper Vergoote

16 October 2026	Beveren (1)	3–0	Habay-la-Neuve (3)	Beveren
20:30 CEST	Slegers 38'; Verschueren 50'; Olatunji 90'	Report		Stadium: Freethiel Stadion; Referee: Jasper Vitse

16 October 2026	Hasselt (2)	1–2	Cercle Brugge (1)	Hasselt
20:30 CEST	Van Keymolen 80' (pen.)	Report	Manneh 20'; Ngoura 48'	Stadium: Stedelijk Sportstadion Hasselt; Referee: Matonga Simonini

16 October 2026	Standard Liège (1)	2–0	Dender EH (2)	Liège
21:00 CEST	Abid 29'; Nguene 88'	Report		Stadium: Stade Maurice Dufrasne; Referee: Anthony Letellier

17 October 2026	Heist (3)	0–1	Antwerp (1)	Heist-op-den-Berg
17:30 CEST		Report	Somers 64'	Stadium: Omodo Jaecoo Sportpark; Referee: Bert Verbeke

17 October 2026	Mons (3)	0–1 (a.e.t.)	Charleroi (1)	Mons
17:30 CEST		Report	Keita 102'	Stadium: Stade Charles Tondreau; Referee: Nathan Verboomen

17 October 2026	OH Leuven (1)	1–0	Francs Borains (2)	Leuven
17:30 CEST	Pletinckx 61'	Report		Stadium: Den Dreef; Referee: Nicolas Laforge

17 October 2026	Zulte Waregem (1)	3–0	Seraing (2)	Waregem
20:45 CEST	Aké 15'; Mbodji 77'; Ementa 87' (pen.)	Report		Stadium: Elindus Arena; Referee: Michiel Allaerts

17 October 2026	Club Brugge (1)	1–0	Lokeren (2)	Bruges
20:45 CEST	Lemaréchal 45'	Report		Stadium: Jan Breydel Stadium; Referee: Jan Boterberg

17 October 2026	Virton (2)	0–2	Genk (1)	Virton
20:45 CEST		Report	Durosinmi 17'; Heymans 28'	Stadium: Stade Yvan Georges; Referee: Wesli De Cremer

17 October 2026	La Louvière (1)	4–0	RFC Liège (2)	La Louvière
20:45 CEST	Gruber 31'; Faye 62'; Rousseau 73'; Filet 84'	Report		Stadium: Easi Arena; Referee: Kevin Van Damme

18 October 2026	KV Mechelen (1)	5–1	Eupen (2)	Eupen
13:30 CEST	Koudou 26'; Decherf 36'; Lohunanu-Mbasi 47'; Hammar 49'; Van Brederode 65'	Report	Plastun 4'	Stadium: Achter de Kazerne

18 October 2026	Rochefort (3)	3–3 (a.e.t.) (4–3 p)	Gent (1)	Rochefort
13:30 CEST	Azevedo 19'; Lauwrensens 64'; Vanhecke 70' (pen.)	Report	Seck 38', 61'; Hoedaert 60' (o.g.)	Stadium: Stade du Parc des Roches
	Penalties
	Essikal (penalty scored); Vanhecke (penalty scored); Hoedaert (penalty scored); Sarr (penalty scored)		(penalty scored) De Vlieger; (penalty scored) Delorge; (penalty scored) Diallo; (penalty missed) Sonko; (penalty missed) Balikwisha

18 October 2026	Union SG (1)	3–0	Nijlen (4)	Forest
13:30 CEST	Florucz 69'; Zeneli 80'; Van de Perre 83'	Report		Stadium: Joseph Marien Stadium

18 October 2026	Beerschot (2)	2–1	Anderlecht (1)	Antwerp
18:00 CEST	Haj Mohamed 22', 72'	Report	Bertaccini 86'	Stadium: Olympisch Stadion

18 October 2026	Sint-Truiden (1)	4–1	Lommel (1)	Sint-Truiden
18:30 CEST	Matsuzawa 26'; Shinkawa 39'; Soèllé Soèllé 62'; Mbuku 74'	Report	Van Duiven 4'	Stadium: Stayen

== Eighth round ==
The draw for the eighth round will take place after the completion of the seventh round.

number of eligible teams per tier (U23-teams cannot participate) still in competition
Pro League	Challenger Pro League	Division 1	Division 2	Division 3	Provincial Leagues	Total
14 / 18	1 / 11	1 / 23	0 / 45	0 / 64	0 / 116	16 / 277

4 December 2026	Club Brugge (1)	v	Beveren (1)	Bruges
20:30 CET				Stadium: Jan Breydel Stadium

4 December 2026	Union SG (1)	v	Westerlo (1)	Forest
21:00 CET				Stadium: Joseph Marien Stadium

5 December 2026	Charleroi (1)	v	Sint-Truiden (1)	Charleroi
17:30 CET				Stadium: Stade du Pays de Charleroi

5 December 2026	Zulte Waregem (1)	v	Cercle Brugge (1)	Waregem
17:30 CET				Stadium: Elindus Arena

5 December 2026	La Louvière (1)	v	Standard Liège (1)	La Louvière
20:45 CET				Stadium: Easi Arena

5 December 2026	Beerschot (2)	v	Genk (1)	Antwerp
20:45 CET				Stadium: Olympisch Stadion

6 December 2026	Rochefort (3)	v	KV Mechelen (1)	Rochefort
13:30 CET				Stadium: Stade du Parc des Roches

6 December 2026	Antwerp (1)	v	OH Leuven (1)	Antwerp
18:30 CET				Stadium: Bosuilstadion

== Quarter-finals ==
The draw for the quarter-finals will take place after the eighth round matches are concluded.

== Semi-finals ==
The four quarter-final winners will enter the semi-finals, held over two legs.
