= Thomas van Bommel =

Dutch footballer (born 2002)

Personal information
- Date of birth: 11 July 2002 (age 24)
- Place of birth: Meerssen, Netherlands
- Height: 1.91 m (6 ft 3 in)
- Position: Midfielder

Youth career
- –2013: Fortuna Sittard
- 2013–2016: Meerssen
- 2016–2020: MVV

Senior career*
Years	Team	Apps	(Gls)
2020–2023	MVV	48	(1)
2023–2025	Patro Eisden	0	(0)
2024	→ Sporting Hasselt (loan)	13	(1)
2024–2025	→ Bocholt (loan)	4	(1)
2025–2026	Tongeren	26	(3)
- * Club domestic league appearances and goals

Thomas van Bommel (born 11 July 2002) is a Dutch footballer who plays as a midfielder.

== Career ==
=== MVV ===
Van Bommel made his professional debut for MVV in the Eerste Divisie on 22 September 2020, coming on as an 88th-minute substitute for Jelle Duin in a 2–0 loss to Den Bosch. On 30 October, he replaced Kai Heerings with four minutes to play against Helmond Sport and scored his first professional goal to equalise in a 1–1 away draw.

=== Patro Eisden ===
On 1 May 2023, it was announced that Van Bommel had signed with Challenger Pro League club Patro Eisden Maasmechelen, joining the club as a free agent from 1 July 2023. After failing to make an appearance for the club, he was sent on loan to Sporting Hasselt for the remainder of the season.

In July 2024, Van Bommel was sent on a one-season loan to Bocholt VV. He missed most of the 2024–25 season with a groin injury, ultimately appearing only in the final four matches.

=== Tongeren ===
Ahead of the 2025–26 season, Van Bommel joined Belgian Division 2 club Tongeren, filling the central-midfield vacancy left by the departure of Oleg Kuchinska.

In September 2026, he announced his provisional retirement from football due to a recurring injury.

== Personal life ==
Van Bommel's father is Mark van Bommel, and his younger brother is Ruben van Bommel, while his maternal grandfather is Bert van Marwijk. His father played for the Netherlands in the 2010 FIFA World Cup final, in which van Marwijk was the manager.

== Career statistics ==
As of match played 26 April 2026

Appearances and goals by club, season and competition
Club	Season	League			National cup (Note: Includes KNVB Cup)		Total	
Club	Season	Division	Apps	Goals	Apps	Goals	Apps	Goals
MVV	2020–21	Eerste Divisie	13	1	1	0	14	1
MVV	2021–22	Eerste Divisie	18	0	1	0	19	0
MVV	2022–23	Eerste Divisie	17	0	0	0	17	0
MVV	Total		48	1	2	0	50	1
Patro Eisden	2023–24	Challenger Pro League	0	0	0	0	0	0
Hasselt (loan)	2023–24	Belgian Division 2	13	1	—		13	1
Bocholt (loan)	2024–25	Belgian Division 2	4	1	0	0	4	1
Tongeren	2025–26	Belgian Division 2	26	3	0	0	26	3
Career total			91	6	2	0	93	6
