= 2025–26 Belgian Division 2 =

Belgian Division 2
- Season: 2025–26
- Dates: 23 August 2025 –
- Champions: VV A: Mandel United; VV B: Heist; FFA: Onhaye
- Promoted: VV: Mandel United; Heist; Harelbeke; FFA: Onhaye; Flénu
- Relegated: VV A: Westhoek; Gullegem; VV B: Rotselaar; Berchem; Berg en Dal; FFA: Raeren-Eynatten; Sporting Bruxelles; Tilff; Tournai
- Matches: 357
- Goals: 1,115 (3.12 per match)

The 2025–26 Belgian Division 2 is the tenth season of the division in its current format, placed at the fourth-tier of football in Belgium.

== Team changes ==
=== In ===
Relegated from the Belgian Division 1:

- Cappellen, Heist, Young Reds Antwerp, Tournai and Binche.

Promoted from the Belgian Division 3:

- VV champions: Mandel United (VV A) and Londerzeel (VV B).
- ACFF champions: Richelle United and Braine.
- VV play-off winners: Diksmuide-Oostende, Hamme, Kalken, Nijlen and Wetteren.
- ACFF play-off winners: Flénu, Tilff and Sporting Bruxelles.
- Additional promotion: Rotselaar (VV B) to fill vacancy created by Jong KV Mechelen move to VV A.

=== Out ===
Promoted to the 2025–26 Belgian Division 1:

- VV champions: Roeselare (VV A) and Houtvenne (VV B).
- ACFF champion: Crossing Schaerbeek.
- Play-off winners: Diegem, Habay-la-Neuve and Meux.
- Zelzate were promoted to Belgian Division 1 due to Jong Genk remain in Challenger Pro League

Relegated to the 2025–26 Belgian Division 3:

- Olsa Brakel, Lille, Pelt, Voorde-Appelterre, Wezel Sport, La Louvière Centre, Verlaine and Eupen U23.
- The U23 teams of Westerlo and Seraing were withdrawn.
- Dikkelvenne was voluntarily relegated to the Belgian Provincial Leagues.

=== Internal moves ===
Jong KV Mechelen moved from VV B to VV A due to Zelzate's promotion to Division 1.

== Belgian Division 2 VV A ==
Locations of the 2025–26 Belgian Division 2 VV A teams

=== League table ===
Pos	Team	Pld	W	D	L	GF	GA	GD	Pts	Qualification or relegation
1	Mandel United (Note: The match between Mandel United and Oostkamp on Matchday 28 was suspended after 82 minutes, with the score at 1-1, due to an alleged racist incident. Oostkamp walked off the pitch and refused to continue play. One week later, Mandel United was acquitted due to insufficient evidence. As Oostkamp had abandoned the match, they were penalized with a 5-0 loss and a 250 Euro fine.) (C, P)	30	20	8	2	60	21	+39	68	Promotion to the 2026–27 Belgian Division 1
2	Diksmuide-Oostende (Note: Only five clubs applied for a license to play in Division 1, including champions Mandel United. Therefore, the other four clubs automatically qualified for promotion play-offs.)	30	19	4	7	56	27	+29	61	Qualification for the Promotion play-offs VV
3	Lebbeke	30	13	7	10	38	40	−2	46	
4	Wetteren	30	13	6	11	50	47	+3	45	
5	Oostkamp	30	13	5	12	50	48	+2	44	
6	Torhout	30	13	2	15	54	60	−6	41	
7	Petegem	30	12	5	13	43	46	−3	41	
8	Harelbeke (O, P)	30	10	11	9	57	47	+10	41	Qualification for the Promotion play-offs VV
9	Kalken	30	11	6	13	42	58	−16	39	
10	Hamme	30	10	6	14	45	56	−11	36	
11	Jong Essevee	30	8	12	10	57	53	+4	36	Qualification for the Promotion play-offs VV
12	Jong KV Mechelen	30	10	5	15	51	58	−7	35	Qualification for the Promotion play-offs VV
13	Oudenaarde	30	9	8	13	39	54	−15	35	
14	Racing Gent	30	9	7	14	46	66	−20	34	Qualification for the Relegation play-offs
15	Westhoek (R)	30	9	6	15	45	46	−1	33	Relegation to the 2026–27 Belgian Division 3
16	Gullegem (R)	30	8	8	14	47	53	−6	32	Relegation to the 2026–27 Belgian Division 3

Updated to match(es) played on 27 April 2026. Source: RBFA
Rules for classification: 1) Points; 2) Matches won; 3) Goal difference; 4) Goals scored; 5) Away matches won; 6) Goal difference in away matches; 7) Away goals scored.
(C) Champions; (O) Play-off winners; (P) Promoted; (R) Relegated

=== Period champions ===
- Period 1: Mandel United
- Period 2: Mandel United
- Period 3: Wetteren

=== Results ===
Home \ Away	DIK	ESS	GEN	GUL	HAM	HAR	KAL	KVM	LEB	MAN	OOS	OUD	PET	TOR	WES	WET
Diksmuide-Oostende	—	0–0	2–4	1–2	3–0	1–0	3–0	5–0	5–0	1–2	3–1	2–1	1–0	0–2	2–1	2–0
Jong Essevee	1–3	—	1–1	2–2	5–1	1–4	4–0	3–4	4–1	1–2	2–3	3–1	0–0	4–1	5–3	1–1
Racing Gent	0–0	2–4	—	2–1	1–0	2–1	4–3	0–2	1–0	1–3	2–3	1–5	2–0	1–4	1–4	3–1
Gullegem	1–2	2–1	1–3	—	2–3	0–0	5–0	2–0	2–2	0–1	0–3	3–3	3–1	3–1	2–2	1–2
Hamme	0–1	2–3	3–0	2–4	—	2–2	0–3	3–0	0–1	0–3	3–2	2–0	0–1	3–0	1–1	1–2
Harelbeke	1–1	2–2	4–2	3–3	5–1	—	0–2	1–2	1–1	1–3	1–3	1–1	1–3	2–1	2–0	1–1
Kalken	2–1	1–1	1–1	2–1	1–1	3–3	—	1–3	0–2	0–2	1–0	4–2	0–3	1–4	2–1	1–1
Jong KV Mechelen	1–2	3–0	3–3	4–0	3–3	3–3	1–3	—	2–2	1–2	2–3	0–0	0–3	0–1	2–1	2–3
Lebbeke	2–1	2–0	2–0	2–0	0–2	1–1	1–3	3–1	—	0–0	4–0	0–0	0–1	1–0	2–1	2–1
Mandel United	0–1	2–2	0–0	2–1	1–1	1–0	1–1	2–1	2–2	—	5–0 FF	4–0	3–0	4–0	2–1	1–1
Oostkamp	0–1	3–1	1–0	2–1	4–0	0–1	4–1	2–1	2–0	1–1	—	2–2	2–2	5–1	0–3	0–1
Oudenaarde	1–0	2–2	3–2	2–2	0–4	0–5	2–0	1–0	0–1	0–1	2–2	—	1–2	3–4	3–0	1–0
Petegem	2–3	0–0	5–0	2–0	2–2	2–3	1–3	0–1	0–4	1–5	1–1	1–0	—	4–1	2–1	4–2
Torhout	1–3	1–1	1–1	1–2	1–3	1–4	2–1	1–5	6–0	2–3	3–1	5–0	2–0	—	3–2	3–2
Westhoek	2–2	1–1	4–4	1–0	0–1	1–2	0–1	4–1	1–0	0–2	2–0	0–1	2–0	1–0	—	1–1
Wetteren	0–4	3–2	4–2	1–1	5–1	3–2	4–1	1–3	3–0	1–0	1–0	1–2	3–0	0–1	1–4	—

Updated to match(es) played on 26 April 2026. Source: RBFA
Legend: Blue = home team win; Yellow = draw; Red = away team win.

== Belgian Division 2 VV B ==
Locations of the 2025–26 Belgian Division 2 VV B teams

=== League table ===
Pos	Team	Pld	W	D	L	GF	GA	GD	Pts	Qualification or relegation
1	Heist (P, C)	30	20	5	5	85	28	+57	65	Promotion to the 2026–27 Belgian Division 1
2	Londerzeel	30	20	5	5	68	39	+29	65	Qualification for the Promotion play-offs VV
3	Young Reds Antwerp^{U23}	30	19	4	7	62	27	+35	61	Qualification for the Promotion play-offs VV
4	Termien (Note: Termien did not obtain a Division 1 license, so were ineligible for the play-offs.)	30	17	4	9	70	48	+22	55	
5	Rupel Boom	30	16	5	9	53	42	+11	53	Qualification for the Promotion play-offs VV
6	Bocholt	30	15	3	12	52	41	+11	48	Qualification for the Promotion play-offs VV
7	Hades	30	12	5	13	38	56	−18	41	
8	Wellen	30	11	6	13	34	47	−13	39	
9	Racing Mechelen	30	9	9	12	38	40	−2	36	
10	Nijlen	30	8	10	12	49	64	−15	34	
11	STVV Youth^{U23}	30	9	6	15	62	74	−12	33	
12	Tongeren	30	7	12	11	39	54	−15	33	
13	Cappellen	30	9	4	17	49	70	−21	31	
14	Rotselaar	30	7	9	14	45	59	−14	30	Qualification for the Relegation play-offs
15	Berchem (R)	30	5	10	15	36	53	−17	25	Relegation to the 2026–27 Belgian Division 3
16	Berg en Dal (R)	30	6	3	21	34	72	−38	21	Relegation to the 2026–27 Belgian Division 3

Source: RBFA
Rules for classification: 1) Points; 2) Matches won; 3) Goal difference; 4) Goals scored; 5) Away matches won; 6) Goal difference in away matches; 7) Away goals scored.
(C) Champions; (P) Promoted; (R) Relegated

=== Period champions ===
- Period 1: Londerzeel
- Period 2: Heist
- Period 3: Hades

=== Results ===
Home \ Away	BED	BER	BOC	CAP	HAD	HEI	LON	NIJ	RCM	ROT	RUP	STR	TER	TON	WEL	YRA
Berg en Dal	—	3–4	1–2	2–2	1–2	1–5	1–3	0–2	1–3	2–0	0–1	3–2	4–2	0–4	1–0	0–3
Berchem	2–0	—	2–2	1–1	1–1	2–4	1–1	1–3	0–3	1–2	0–1	1–1	0–2	1–1	1–1	2–2
Bocholt	2–1	1–3	—	1–3	3–4	0–1	0–2	0–0	1–0	2–4	2–3	2–0	1–3	5–0	4–0	1–0
Cappellen	2–0	2–1	2–3	—	2–0	0–6	1–3	2–0	0–3	2–3	1–2	2–4	1–2	2–2	2–1	0–3
Hades	2–1	1–0	0–1	1–0	—	1–3	1–0	2–1	1–0	1–1	3–1	3–5	0–3	1–2	1–1	1–0
Heist	4–1	2–2	3–0	5–0	5–0	—	1–1	5–0	0–0	5–0	3–1	1–0	5–1	4–0	2–1	0–1
Londerzeel	1–0	1–0	1–3	3–1	4–3	1–0	—	2–1	1–1	3–2	3–1	4–5	5–3	4–1	3–0	1–2
Nijlen	2–2	2–0	2–3	3–2	3–0	1–1	1–3	—	2–2	1–1	2–4	2–2	2–1	1–1	1–0	2–3
Racing Mechelen	1–2	0–2	1–0	5–1	1–2	1–3	1–1	1–2	—	1–0	1–0	1–1	1–1	1–1	1–1	1–3
Rotselaar	2–4	1–1	0–3	1–2	2–2	1–5	1–2	2–2	2–3	—	3–3	5–1	2–2	1–1	1–2	0–1
Rupel Boom	5–0	3–2	1–0	3–3	3–0	1–4	2–2	4–1	1–0	2–1	—	2–1	0–1	1–1	2–0	0–2
STVV Youth	5–1	3–2	0–5 FF (Note: The match between STVV Youth and Bocholt had originally ended in a 6–2 win for the home team, however Bocholt filed a complaint and the match result was changed into a 0–5 forfeit win as the disciplinary committee had ruled that the home team had used several ineligible players from their mother club Sint-Truiden.)	2–3	3–4	2–6	2–3	5–5	3–0	1–2	1–3	—	1–3	4–2	0–1	3–1
Termien	2–1	3–2	1–2	6–2	2–0	2–1	1–2	5–1	4–1	2–2	3–1	4–0	—	3–3	3–0	0–1
Tongeren	0–0	0–1	0–0	0–7	0–0	1–0	0–4	2–1	1–1	0–1	0–1	1–3	3–0	—	6–0	0–6
Wellen	2–1	3–0	0–2	2–0	4–0	1–1	1–3	5–0	2–1	2–1	1–1	1–1	0–3	0–5	—	1–0
Young Reds Antwerp	5–0	3–0	3–1	2–1	3–1	5–0	2–1	3–3	1–2	0–1	1–0	1–1	4–2	1–1	0–1	—

Updated to match(es) played on 26 April 2026. Source: RBFA
Legend: Blue = home team win; Yellow = draw; Red = away team win.

== Belgian Division 2 FFA ==
On 15 April 2026, the ACFF announced that it was renaming itself to the "Football Francophone Amateur" (FFA).

Locations of the 2025–26 Belgian Division 2 FFA teams

=== League table ===
Pos	Team	Pld	W	D	L	GF	GA	GD	Pts	Qualification or relegation
1	Onhaye (C, P)	34	20	7	7	61	46	+15	67	Promotion to the 2026–27 Belgian Division 1
2	Ganshoren	34	19	8	7	67	32	+35	65	Qualification for the Promotion play-offs FFA
3	Verviers	34	19	8	7	45	30	+15	65	Qualification for the Promotion play-offs FFA
4	Flénu (O, P)	34	18	6	10	75	45	+30	60	Qualification for the Promotion play-offs FFA
5	Braine	34	18	5	11	63	40	+23	59	
6	Union Hutoise	34	15	12	7	47	37	+10	57	
7	Ostiches-Ath	34	15	10	9	46	33	+13	55	
8	Raeren-Eynatten (Note: Raeren-Eynatten chose to restart at the provincial level) (R)	34	14	9	11	40	39	+1	51	Relegation to Belgian Provincial Leagues
9	Jette	34	11	16	7	53	43	+10	49	
10	La Calamine	34	13	8	13	45	43	+2	47	
11	Acren-Lessines	34	13	6	15	70	69	+1	45	
12	Richelle United	34	12	7	15	49	44	+5	43	
13	Manageoise	34	11	8	15	47	62	−15	41	
14	Binche	34	12	7	15	39	46	−7	40 (Note: Binche were deducted three points before the start of the season)	
15	Aywaille	34	9	8	17	49	60	−11	35	
16	Sporting Bruxelles (R)	34	8	5	21	36	66	−30	29	Relegation to the 2026–27 Belgian Division 3
17	Tilff (R)	34	7	5	22	27	62	−35	26	Relegation to the 2026–27 Belgian Division 3
18	Tournai (Note: Tournai relegated to the provincial level due to going into administration) (R)	34	2	5	27	32	94	−62	11	Relegation to Belgian Provincial Leagues

Source: RBFA
Rules for classification: 1) Points; 2) Matches won; 3) Goal difference; 4) Goals scored; 5) Away matches won; 6) Goal difference in away matches; 7) Away goals scored.
(C) Champions; (O) Play-off winners; (P) Promoted; (R) Relegated

=== Period champions ===
- Period 1: Braine
- Period 2: Ganshoren
- Period 3: Onhaye

=== Results ===
Home \ Away	A-L	AYW	BIN	BRA	FLE	GAN	HUY	JET	LAC	MAN	ONH	O-A	R-E	RIC	SPB	TIL	TOU	VEV
Acren-Lessines	—	3–1	3–1	3–2	1–2	2–3	4–0	1–3	3–1	1–4	2–2	1–3	5–2	3–4	1–2	1–2	3–1	2–4
Aywaille	3–1	—	0–0	3–0	1–3	0–2	1–4	1–3	3–1	4–1	0–1	2–2	1–1	1–1	2–2	2–3	4–1	0–0
Binche	3–1	1–2	—	0–4	2–1	1–0	0–0	2–2	1–2	1–0	1–2	0–1	1–1	0–0	1–0	2–1	2–1	0–3
Braine	1–3	2–0	0–1	—	3–2	2–2	1–1	4–0	1–0	4–0	1–2	0–3	0–0	2–0	2–0	2–0	3–1	2–0
Flénu	2–3	4–1	1–0	1–2	—	2–3	0–0	2–5	4–0	3–2	2–2	0–1	3–0	2–1	2–1	5–1	5–1	2–2
Ganshoren	2–1	1–0	3–1	3–1	0–1	—	0–0	1–1	1–1	0–1	0–2	1–1	1–2	4–1	6–0	4–0	3–0	0–0
Union Hutoise	2–2	1–1	3–2	0–2	0–0	1–3	—	2–2	3–0	1–1	1–2	1–1	1–0	2–1	0–0	1–0	3–1	0–2
Jette	2–0	3–0	1–1	0–2	0–0	0–0	1–1	—	3–3	1–2	1–1	1–3	1–0	2–1	2–2	0–0	1–1	0–0
La Calamine	2–2	4–3	1–0	1–2	1–1	2–0	1–2	0–0	—	4–1	1–1	1–0	3–1	1–0	1–0	3–0	5–0	0–2
Manageoise	2–3	3–0	2–1	2–1	0–5	1–4	2–3	1–1	2–2	—	1–3	0–0	3–3	1–0	1–0	2–0	0–2	2–3
Onhaye	2–2	3–2	2–1	3–2	4–3	1–4	1–2	2–0	2–0	4–0	—	1–4	1–0	0–4	0–1	4–3	2–2	1–0
Ostiches-Ath	2–2	2–2	0–2	1–1	1–2	1–2	0–2	3–0	2–1	0–3	2–0	—	0–1	2–1	1–0	0–0	3–0	0–1
Raeren-Eynatten	4–0	2–1	2–1	2–0	1–5	1–4	0–1	1–1	1–0	1–1	0–2	0–0	—	1–0	4–0	2–0	1–0	0–0
Richelle United	0–2	2–1	2–2	1–1	2–0	2–0	1–2	1–3	0–0	1–0	1–2	1–1	0–2	—	2–0	4–0	3–1	0–3
Sporting Bruxelles	0–3	1–2	2–3	1–2	1–2	0–2	1–0	1–5	1–0	3–2	2–2	3–1	1–2	0–5	—	1–0	6–2	1–3
Tilff	2–2	0–2	2–0	2–5	0–2	1–1	2–1	2–1	0–1	1–1	0–2	1–2	0–1	1–4	1–0	—	0–1	1–2
Tournai	1–4	1–3	1–4	0–5	1–5	1–3	2–4	1–3	0–2	1–2	0–2	0–2	1–1	1–2	3–3	0–0	—	1–1
Verviers	2–0	1–0	0–1	2–1	2–1	1–4	0–2	1–4	0–2	1–1	1–0	0–1	1–0	1–1	1–0	1–0	3–2	—

Updated to match(es) played on 26 April 2026. Source: RBFA
Legend: Blue = home team win; Yellow = draw; Red = away team win.

== Play-offs ==
=== Promotion play-offs ===
==== VV ====
The promotion play-offs are contested by eight teams, from each division four teams: the team finishing second overall plus the three period champions. In case one or more periods are won by the eventual champion (already promoted) or by the same club, then the best ranked team that has not already qualified will take its place. Furthermore, any team not eligible (for instance due to not receiving a licence) will not be eligible to take place and the next best ranked team will take its spot.

Qualified teams:

- Bocholt (3rd highest place eligible finisher (6th) not directly qualified from division VV B)
- Diksmuide-Oostende (runner-up division VV A)
- Harelbeke (highest place eligible finisher (8th) not directly qualified from division VV A)
- Jong Essevee (2nd highest place eligible finisher (11th) not directly qualified from division VV A)
- Jong KV Mechelen (3rd highest place eligible finisher (12th) not directly qualified from division VV A)
- Londerzeel (runner-up division VV B)
- Rupel Boom (2nd highest place eligible finisher (5th) not directly qualified from division VV B)
- Young Reds Antwerp (highest place eligible finisher (3rd) not directly qualified from division VV B)

The eight teams are playing for a single extra promotion spot, there was no seeding during the draw, and a consolation 3rd-place match was drawn as well to determine a full top 4 ranking in case extra spots would become available.

Round 1
3 May 2026
Jong KV Mechelen	2 (3)
Rupel Boom (p)	2 (4)
3 May 2026
Londerzeel (a.e.t.)	3
Young Reds Antwerp	1
1 May 2026
Diksmuide-Oostende	1
Harelbeke	2
3 May 2026
Bocholt	2
Jong Essevee	3

Round 2
10 May 2026
Rupel Boom	2
Londerzeel (a.e.t.)	3
10 May 2026
Harelbeke	3
Jong Essevee	0

Placing 1st/2nd
14 May 2026
Londerzeel	1 (3)
Harelbeke	1 (4)
Placing 3rd/4th
14 May 2026
Jong Essevee	1
Rupel Boom	2

===== Round 1 =====
3 May 2026
15:00 CEST

Bocholt	2–3	Jong Essevee
Vermijl 25'; Carvalho Alleoni 54'	Report	Talini 3'; Van Keymolen 55', 80'

Axor Arena, Bocholt
Referee: Ruben Wuyts

3 May 2026
15:00 CEST

Jong KV Mechelen	2–2 (a.e.t.)	Rupel Boom
Van Helden 13'; Cicero 26'	Report	Geudens 16'; Lemti 90'
Penalties
Van Der Velde (penalty missed); Struyf (penalty scored); Conaert (penalty scored); Golic (penalty missed); Azaouzi (penalty scored); Nuyts (penalty missed)	3–4	(penalty missed) Daif; (penalty scored) Mbaye; (penalty missed) Geudens; (penalty scored) Belhadj; (penalty scored) Houttequiet; (penalty scored) Coveliers

Domein Het Breeven, Bornem
Referee: Lauren Cools

1 May 2026
16:00 CEST

Diksmuide-Oostende	1–2	Harelbeke
Bronchain 59'	Report	Dubrovnyi 17'; Veeckman 52'

Batimont Solar Park, Ostend
Referee: Dirk Schoenmaeckers

3 May 2026
15:00 CEST

Londerzeel	3–1 (a.e.t.)	Young Reds Antwerp
Tshimanga 79'; Atãnãsoae 110'; Guldix 120'	Report	Renders 21'

Eeckelaers Stadion, Londerzeel
Referee: Yves Verslycken

===== Round 2 =====
10 May 2026
15:00 CEST

Harelbeke	3–0	Jong Essevee
Bendianishvili 37'; Dubrovnyi 60' (pen.), 82'	Report

Forestierstadion, Harelbeke
Referee: Bram De Clercq

10 May 2026
15:00 CEST

Rupel Boom	2–3 (a.e.t.)	Londerzeel
Daif 80'; Geeraerts 84'	Report	Tshimanga 51'; Siebens 66', 115'

Gemeentelijk Parkstadion, Boom
Referee: Wouter Debusscher

===== Placing 3rd/4th =====
14 May 2026
15:00 CEST

Jong Essevee	1–2	Rupel Boom
Balde 47'	Report	Daif 63'; Wauters 80'

The Farm, Zulte
Referee: Jonas Timmermans

===== Placing 1st/2nd =====
14 May 2026
18:00 CEST

Londerzeel	1–1 (a.e.t.)	Harelbeke
El Madani 120'	Report	Degryse 95'
Penalties
Dellevoet (penalty missed); Ibn El Mokadem (penalty scored); El Madani (penalty scored); Siebens (penalty scored); Van Den Steen (penalty missed)	3–4	(penalty scored) Bendianishvili; (penalty scored) De Backer; (penalty scored) Verhaest; (penalty scored) Dubrovnyi; (penalty missed) Coopman

Eeckelaers Stadion, Londerzeel
Referee: Tom Lamberigts

==== FFA ====
Four teams normally contest the promotion play-offs: the team finishing second overall plus the three period champions. In case one or more periods are won by the eventual champion (already promoted) or by the same club, then the best-ranked team that has not already qualified will take its place. Furthermore, any team not eligible (for instance, due to not receiving a licence) will not be eligible to take place, and the next best-ranked team will take its spot.

Qualified teams:

- Flénu (2nd highest place eligible finisher (4th) not directly qualified)
- Ganshoren (runner-up)
- Verviers (highest place eligible finisher (3rd) not directly qualified)

As only three teams had applied and successfully obtained a licence, one team was drawn to receive a bye in the first round. Only the second round winner will be promoted to the 2026–27 Belgian Division 1

Round 1
3 May 2026
Flénu (a.e.t.)	4
Ganshoren	2

Round 2
10 May 2026
Flénu	3
Verviers	1

===== Round 1 =====
3 May 2026
15:00 CEST

Flénu	4–2 (a.e.t.)	Ganshoren
Durieux 54', 90'; Lagneaux 108', 110'	Report	Bosango 9', 51'

Complexe Sportif Flénu, Flénu
Referee: Arnaud Soors

===== Round 2 =====
10 May 2026
15:00 CEST

Flénu	3–1	Verviers
Laurent 45'; Ulens 70'; Petta 77'	Report	Meunier 15'

Complexe Sportif Flénu, Flénu
Referee: Ibrahim Afifi

Flénu was promoted to the Belgian Division 1.

=== Relegation play-off ===
At this level of the football pyramid, there is only a relegation playoff on the VV-side, with the two teams finishing 14th playing each other. Going into the match, it was already near certain that both clubs would be spared, as none of the VV teams had been relegated from the 2025–26 Challenger Pro League, but rules stipulate that the match needed to be played to determine the order in case an extra relegation was necessary.

30 April 2026
20:30 CEST

RC Gent	2–1	Rotselaar
Rommens 71'; Hitchinson 88'	Report	Buekers 53'

Chillax Arena, Oostakker
Referee: Jiri Bergs

== See also ==
- 2025–26 Belgian Pro League
- 2025–26 Challenger Pro League
- 2025–26 Belgian Division 1
- 2025–26 Belgian Division 3
- 2025–26 Belgian Cup
