= 2026–27 Belgian Division 1 =

Belgian Division 1
- Season: 2026–27
- Dates: August 2026 – May 2027

The 2026–27 Belgian Division 1 is the eleventh season of the third-tier football league. It is the third season in which the division is split into two groups: VV (Voetbal Vlaanderen) and FFA (Football Francophone Amateur).

== Team changes ==
=== Out ===
The following teams were promoted at the end of the 2025–26 season:

- To Challenger Pro League:
  - VV: Hasselt
  - FFA: Virton

The following teams were relegated at the end of the 2025–26 season:

- To Belgian Division 2:
  - VV: Diegem, Ninove
  - FFA: Namur, Schaerbeek, Stockay

=== In ===
The following teams were relegated from the Challenger Pro League:

- RWDM Brussels and Olympic Charleroi (both FFA)

The following teams were promoted from the Belgian Division 2:

- VV group:
  - Mandel United (as champions of division VV A)
  - Heist (as champions of division VV B)
  - Harelbeke (via play-offs)
- FFA group:
  - Onhaye (as champions)
  - Flénu (via play-offs)

== VV ==
Locations of the 2026–27 Belgian National Division 1 VV teams

=== League table ===
Pos	Team	Pld	W	D	L	GF	GA	GD	Pts	Qualification or relegation
1	Mandel United	12	8	1	3	23	12	11	25	Promotion to the Challenger Pro League
2	Roeselare	12	7	4	1	21	5	16	25	
3	Houtvenne	12	7	2	3	23	16	7	23	
4	Thes	12	6	4	2	20	13	7	22	
5	OH Leuven U-23^{U23}	12	6	4	2	25	19	6	22	
6	Belisia	12	6	2	4	23	19	4	20	
7	Merelbeke	12	5	3	4	16	14	2	18	
8	Dessel	12	5	3	4	24	24	0	18	
9	Heist	12	5	2	5	24	17	7	17	
10	Hoogstraten	12	4	4	4	26	21	5	16	
11	Knokke	12	4	1	7	14	20	−6	13	
12	Tienen	12	3	3	6	19	21	−2	12	
13	Jong Cercle^{U23}	12	2	4	6	17	28	−11	10	
14	Lyra-Lierse	12	2	3	7	18	27	−9	9	
15	Zelzate	12	2	3	7	15	28	−13	9	Relegation to Division 2
16	Harelbeke	12	2	1	9	9	33	−24	7	Relegation to Division 2

Updated to match(es) played on 15 November 2026. Source: Voetbal Vlaanderen : Competitie 1e Afdeling Voetb Vl (in Dutch)
Rules for classification: 1) Points; 2) Matches won; 3) Goal difference; 4) Goals scored; 5) Away goals scored; 6) Away matches won.

=== Results ===
Home \ Away	BEL	CER	DES	HAR	HEI	HOO	HOU	KNO	LLB	MAN	MER	OHL	ROE	TES	TIE	ZEL
Belisia	—				3–1		3–4		4–0		1–0			0–3	2–2	
Jong Cercle		—				1–4	1–1	2–1	2–1						1–3	1–1
Dessel	3–4	3–1	—	4–0		1–1		1–0				2–2				
Harelbeke				—		3–3			0–3	0–3				1–0	0–4	1–4
Heist		3–1		2–1	—	1–2	4–0							1–1	4–0	
Hoogstraten	0–1					—	3–0		4–4		2–3		1–1			
Houtvenne			5–0				—	2–0		2–1	1–1	3–1		1–2		
Knokke	3–2			0–2	3–0			—			0–3	3–2			3–2	
Lyra-Lierse			1–2		3–2		0–1		—				0–3	3–3		1–2
Mandel United	1–0	3–1	4–3			2–1			1–1	—						3–1
Merelbeke		3–1	1–1	3–0	2–1					0–2	—		0–4			
OH Leuven U-23		3–3		4–1	0–0				3–1		1–0	—			2–1	4–3
Roeselare	1–1		2–0	3–0				2–1		1–0		0–0	—	0–1		
Thes		2–2						2–0		2–1		2–3		—	1–0	1–1
Tienen			3–4			3–1				0–2	0–0		1–1		—	
Zelzate	1–2				1–5	1–4	0–3	0–0					0–3			—

Updated to match(es) played on 15 November 2026. Source: Voetbal Vlaanderen : Competitie 1e Afdeling Voetb Vl
Legend: Blue = home team win; Yellow = draw; Red = away team win.

== FFA ==
Locations of the 2026–27 Belgian National Division 1 FFA teams

=== Regular season ===
==== League table ====
Pos	Team	Pld	W	D	L	GF	GA	GD	Pts	Qualification or relegation
1	Meux	13	8	1	4	20	14	6	25	Qualification for Promotion play-offs
2	Union SG B^{U23}	13	7	3	3	25	15	10	24	Qualification for Promotion play-offs
3	Tubize-Braine	13	7	3	3	21	15	6	24	Qualification for Promotion play-offs
4	Mons	13	7	2	4	30	20	10	23	Qualification for Promotion play-offs
5	Rochefort	13	6	4	3	25	14	11	22	Qualification for Promotion play-offs
6	RWDM Brussels	13	6	3	4	17	15	2	21	Qualification for Promotion play-offs
7	Olympic Charleroi	13	5	4	4	18	23	−5	19	Qualification for Relegation play-offs
8	Zébra Élites^{U23}	13	3	6	4	13	14	−1	15	Qualification for Relegation play-offs
9	SL16 FC^{U23}	13	4	2	7	14	15	−1	14	Qualification for Relegation play-offs
10	Onhaye	13	4	2	7	13	22	−9	14	Qualification for Relegation play-offs
11	Habay-la-Neuve	13	3	4	6	11	16	−5	13	Qualification for Relegation play-offs
12	Flénu	13	0	2	11	11	35	−24	2	Qualification for Relegation play-offs

Updated to match(es) played on 15 November 2026. Source: FFA : Compétition D1 FFA (in French)
Rules for classification: 1) Points; 2) Matches won; 3) Goal difference; 4) Goals scored; 5) Away goals scored; 6) Away matches won.

==== Results ====
Home \ Away	ROC	MEU	RWD	USG	MON	TUB	STL	ZEB	OLC	HAB	ONH	FLE
Rochefort	—					2–3	1–0	1–1	4–0	4–2	1–2	
Meux	0–3	—	0–1	2–1				3–2	0–3		2–1	
RWDM Brussels	1–1	0–1	—		1–2	2–1		1–0		1–1		3–0
Union SG B	0–2		4–2	—	4–3		1–0	2–0		2–0		
Mons	2–0	0–5 (Note: The match originally ended in a 0–0 draw, but was awarded as a 5–0 forfeit win to Meux after Mons were found to have not complied with the regulations regarding the number of U21 players in their squad.)			—	2–2	3–0		3–0			4–0
Tubize-Braine	1–4	0–1		1–1		—		1–0	1–1	1–0	2–1	
SL16 FC		0–1	1–1	0–3	3–2	0–1	—				4–1	1–0
Zébra Élites	1–1				1–0		1–0	—	1–1	0–0	0–0	2–2
Olympic Charleroi		1–1	3–1	1–1		1–3	0–5 (Note: The match was suspended and later awarded as a 5–0 forfeit win to SL16 FC following a floodlight failure.)		—	1–0		
Habay-la-Neuve		1–0	1–2	2–1	2–2		0–0			—		2–1
Onhaye			0–1	0–0	2–5			2–4	0–2	1–0	—	1–0
Flénu	1–1	1–4		2–5	0–2	0–4			3–4		1–2	—

Updated to match(es) played on 15 November 2026. Source: FFA
Legend: Blue = home team win; Yellow = draw; Red = away team win.

=== Play-offs ===
In the play-offs, teams start with half the points gained during the regular season (rounded up).

== See also ==
- 2026–27 Belgian Pro League
- 2026–27 Challenger Pro League
- 2026–27 Belgian Division 2
- 2026–27 Belgian Division 3
- 2026–27 Belgian Cup
