= André Ntambue =

Dutch-Congolese footballer

Personal information
- Full name: André Kalenga Ntambue
- Date of birth: 16 April 1992 (age 34)
- Place of birth: Kinshasa, DR Congo
- Height: 1.82 m (6 ft 0 in)
- Position: Forward

Team information
- Current team: Olsa Brakel
- Number: 12

Youth career
- 2002–2003: FC Utrecht
- 2003–2008: Feyenoord
- 2008–2011: ADO Den Haag

Senior career*
Years	Team	Apps	(Gls)
2011–2013	ADO Den Haag	0	(0)
2013–2014	Diegem Sport	16	(1)
2014	Ceahlăul Piatra Neamț	5	(0)
2014–2015	Royal Géants Athois	24	(7)
2015–2016	Gullegem	19	(11)
2016–2017	Deinze	14	(2)
2017	Landskrona	0	(0)
2017–2018	Gullegem		
2018–2019	KSV Temse		
2019–2020	Olsa Brakel		
2020–2023	KVK Ninove		
2023–	Olsa Brakel	16	(2)
- * Club domestic league appearances and goals as of 18:41, 21 April 2024 (UTC)

André Kalenga Ntambue (born 16 April 1992) is a professional Dutch-Congolese football player who currently plays for Belgian club Olsa Brakel as a forward.

He has formerly played for various clubs in Belgium and Romania.

== Career ==
André Ntambue played in the youth of FC Utrecht, Feyenoord and ADO Den Haag. At ADO Den Haag, he played in the U23 team and in the ADO Den Haag AV amateur team. In 2013 he went to Diegem Sport, which ended in the Third class. After a year and a half, he left for Romanian Ceahlăul Piatra Neamț, with whom he played in League 1. After half a season there, he played two seasons for Third-class clubs Géants Athois and FC Gullegem. In 2016 he left for KMSK Deinze, which ended in the Second Division. Through the reorganization of the Belgian competitions, Deinze relegated to first-class amateurs.

Ahead of the 2023–24 season, Ntambue re-joined his former club, Belgian Division 2 side Olsa Brakel.

== Pro career ==
Ntambue managed to play professionally for Belgian, Romanian and Swedish clubs namely Deinze, C. Piatra Neamț, Gullegem, Royal Géants Athois Diegem Sport with certain appearances. He has appeared in the Belgian and Romanian top flight Beloften Eredivisie and Liga I In March 2015 Ntambue was on trail at Cheltenham Tonwn but was unable to join due to registration issues
