= 2026–27 Belgian Pro League =

124th season of top-tier football in Belgium

Belgian Pro League
- Season: 2026–27
- Dates: 7 August 2026 – 23 May 2027

The 2026–27 Belgian Pro League (officially known as the Jupiler Pro League due to sponsorship reasons) is the 124th season of top-tier football in Belgium.

== Format change ==
The Belgian Pro League returned to a competition without playoffs, after 17 seasons of using the play-off system (in various forms, and with the exception of the 2019–20 season when the playoffs could not be held due to the COVID-19 pandemic). Disputes and legal procedures against this decision have been running until mid-June 2026, mainly due to the fact that as part of the reform, a rule was introduced (during the ongoing 2024-25 season!) that at least four U23-teams would always remain in the Challenger Pro League (and hence could not be relegated unless another U23-team got promoted from the third level). This rule was abolished two seasons later, as it was judged to be illegal by the Belgian Competition Authority, and would result in a yearly fine of €12 million to the Pro League. While this rule was abolished, the reform to 18 teams ultimately remained intact, to the dismay of some teams who argued that if one part of the package was cancelled, the whole reform should be cancelled.

Furthermore, in a debate held in June 2026 between the largest six clubs (Anderlecht, Antwerp, Club Brugge, Genk, Gent, and Union SG), with the exception of Club Brugge, all club leaders acknowledged that a league with 18 teams is far from the best format for Belgium, as it is less interesting for the rights holders, has fewer clashes between big teams, and reduces fan interest throughout the season. Long-term they are aiming to reduce the number of teams in the highest division to 14 or fewer, and reduce the number of professional teams in Belgian football altogether. In the end, the league will expand to 18 teams and be run as a round-robin tournament without playoffs. The bottom two teams will be relegated to the 2027–28 Challenger Pro League.

== Teams ==
Beveren was promoted as champions of the 2025–26 Challenger Pro League already in March 2026, returning to the top level after five seasons. One month later, Kortrijk took the runners-up spot without playing, as third-placed Beerschot dropped points away to Eupen, making it mathematically certain Kortrijk was also promoted, returning to the top level after just one season. On 23 May 2026, Lommel gained promotion for the first time under its current name and 23 years after predecessor KFC Lommel SK, following a 3–2 victory on aggregate in the promotion/relegation play-off final against Dender.

=== Stadiums and locations ===
Locations of the 2026–27 Belgian Pro League teams

Matricule	Club	Location	Venue	Capacity
35	Anderlecht	Anderlecht, Brussels	Constant Vanden Stock Stadium	21,500
1	Antwerp	Antwerp	Bosuilstadion	21,000
4068	Beveren	Beveren	Freethiel Stadion	8,190
12	Cercle Brugge	Bruges	Jan Breydel Stadium	29,042
22	Charleroi	Charleroi	Stade du Pays de Charleroi	14,000
3	Club Brugge	Bruges	Jan Breydel Stadium	29,042
322	Genk	Genk	Cegeka Arena	24,956
7	Gent	Ghent	Planet Group Arena	20,000
19	Kortrijk	Kortrijk	Guldensporen Stadion	9,399
94	La Louvière	La Louvière	Easi Arena	8,050
1986	Lommel SK	Lommel	Soevereinstadion	8,000
25	Mechelen	Mechelen	AFAS-stadion Achter de Kazerne	16,700
18	OH Leuven	Leuven	Den Dreef	10,000
373	Sint-Truiden	Sint-Truiden	Stayen	14,600
16	Standard Liège	Liège	Stade Maurice Dufrasne	30,023
10	Union SG	Forest, Brussels	Stade Joseph Marien	9,400
2024	Westerlo	Westerlo	Het Kuipje	8,035
5381	Zulte Waregem	Waregem	Regenboogstadion	12,500

=== Number of teams by area ===
#	Province or region	Team(s)
4	West Flanders	Cercle Brugge, Club Brugge, Kortrijk, and Zulte Waregem
3	Antwerp	Antwerp, Mechelen and Westerlo
3	Limburg	Genk, Lommel and Sint-Truiden
2	Brussels	Anderlecht and Union SG
2	East Flanders	Beveren and Gent
2	Hainaut	Charleroi and La Louvière
1	Flemish Brabant	OH Leuven
1	Liège	Standard Liège

=== Managerial changes ===
Team	Outgoing manager	Manner of departure	Date of vacancy	Position in the table	Incoming manager	Date of appointment
Zulte Waregem	(Belgium) Steve Colpaert	Moved to assistant role	19 May 2026	Pre-season	(England) Michael Beale	19 May 2026
Anderlecht	(France) Jérémy Taravel	End of caretaker spell	24 May 2026	Pre-season	(Portugal) Vítor Bruno	23 June 2026
Antwerp	(Belgium) Faris Haroun	End of caretaker spell	24 May 2026	Pre-season	(Germany) Marvin Compper	3 August 2026
Beveren	(Netherlands) Marink Reedijk	End of contract	24 May 2026	Pre-season	(Netherlands) Tim Bakens	18 June 2026
OH Leuven	(Belgium) Felice Mazzù	Sacked	27 May 2026	Pre-season	(Belgium) Timmy Simons	23 June 2026
La Louvière	(Belgium) Frédéric Taquin	End of contract	30 June 2026	Pre-season	(England) Edward Still	1 July 2026
Sint-Truiden	(Belgium) Wouter Vrancken	End of contract	30 June 2026	Pre-season	(Belgium) Frédéric De Meyer	1 July 2026
Genk	(Belgium) Nicky Hayen	Signed by Burnley	10 July 2026	Pre-season	(Denmark) Jess Thorup	14 July 2026
Cercle Brugge	(Denmark) Lars Friis	Sacked	2 November 2026	17th	(Portugal) Pedro Caixinha	2 November 2026
La Louvière	(England) Edward Still	Sacked	8 November 2026	17th	(Belgium) Sven Vandenbroeck	12 November 2026

== League table ==
Pos	Team	Pld	W	D	L	GF	GA	GD	Pts	Qualification or relegation
1	Club Brugge	12	10	1	1	32	10	+22	31	Qualification for the Champions League league phase
2	Union SG	11	9	2	0	30	7	+23	29	Qualification for the Champions League third qualifying round
3	Gent	12	9	1	2	20	7	+13	28	Qualification for the Europa League second qualifying round
4	Charleroi	12	9	1	2	28	15	+13	28	Qualification for the Conference League second qualifying round
5	Anderlecht	11	6	2	3	14	12	+2	20	
6	Genk	12	5	3	4	21	15	+6	18	
7	Lommel	11	4	4	3	15	13	+2	16	
8	Standard Liège	11	4	3	4	18	16	+2	15	
9	Westerlo	12	4	2	6	26	31	−5	14	
10	Sint-Truiden	12	3	3	6	24	24	0	12	
11	OH Leuven	11	3	3	5	12	17	−5	12	
12	Antwerp	12	3	3	6	20	26	−6	12	
13	Cercle Brugge	12	3	3	6	15	22	−7	12	
14	Zulte Waregem	12	3	3	6	15	22	−7	12	
15	Mechelen	12	3	3	6	14	25	−11	12	
16	Beveren	12	4	1	7	14	23	−9	13	
17	La Louvière	12	2	1	9	13	27	−14	7	Relegation to Challenger Pro League
18	Kortrijk	11	1	1	9	4	23	−19	4	Relegation to Challenger Pro League

Updated to match(es) played on 22 November 2026. Source: Jupiler Pro League (in Dutch)
Rules for classification: 1) Points; 2) Matches won; 3) Goal difference; 4) Goals scored; 5) Away matches won; 6) Away goal difference; 7) Away goals scored; 8) Play-off.

== Results ==
Home \ Away	AND	ANT	BEV	CER	CHA	CLU	GNK	GNT	KOR	LAL	LOM	MEC	OHL	STR	STA	USG	WES	ZWA
Anderlecht							0–0		1–0	2–1							4–1	3–0
Antwerp			2–1		3–0		4–4				2–2			1–4		0–2		
Beveren	1–0										1–3		3–0	2–0		1–2		
Cercle Brugge	1–2					a		0–3			0–1			3–3			1–0	
Charleroi				3–2								2–0	3–1	2–2		2–3		
Club Brugge		3–1		1–0			3–0		3–0					3–2				
Genk			4–0					1–1	3–0	3–0					2–1		3–2	
Gent	4–0					2–1						2–0	1–0		2–1			
Kortrijk		0–3	1–0		1–3							1–3						0–2
La Louvière				0–1		1–4		1–2	3–0			2–2						3–0
Lommel					0–1	0–1						0–0					4–0	
Mechelen	0–1					1–5	1–0							4–3	3–3		0–4	
OH Leuven				1–1		0–3				2–0	2–2	2–0			1–2			
Sint-Truiden										4–0	1–1					0–3	0–2	
Standard Liège		1–0	3–0	2–2	0–1				1–1	2–0								
Union SG	3–0			5–2			1–0				5–0		1–1					0–0
Westerlo		5–1	4–4		1–5										4–2	1–5		2–2
Zulte Waregem		2–2	4–0		0–1	2–4	2–1	0–2										

Updated to match(es) played on 21 November 2026. Source: Kalender Pro League 2026-27
Legend: Blue = home team win; Yellow = draw; Red = away team win.

== Season statistics ==
=== Top goalscorers ===
Rank	Player	Club	Goals
1	(Germany) Nicolo Tresoldi	Club Brugge	10
2	(Belgium) Norman Bassette	Westerlo	8
2	(Iran) Dennis Eckert	Standard Leige	8
4	(Nigeria) Rafiu Durosinmi	Genk	7
4	(France) Aurelien Scheidler	Charleroi	7
6	(Nigeria) Mustapha Isah	La Louviere	6
6	(Netherlands) Don-Angelo Konadu	Lommel	6
6	(Democratic Republic of the Congo) Freddy Mbemba	Charleroi	6

== See also ==
- 2026–27 Challenger Pro League
- 2026–27 Belgian Division 1
- 2026–27 Belgian Division 2
- 2026–27 Belgian Division 3
- 2026–27 Belgian Cup
