= Kanyinda =

Kanyinda is a surname. Notable people with the surname include:

- Balufu Bakupa-Kanyinda (born 1957), Belgian film director
- Holly Christian Tshimanga Kanyinda (born 1997), Belgian footballer
- Ordane Kanda-Kanyinda (born 1996), Belgian basketball player
- Serge Kanyinda, Congolese actor
