= KFC Nijlen =

- Full name: Koninklijke Football Club Nijlen
- Founded: 1927; 99 years ago (as FC Nijlen)
- Ground: Campus KFC Nijlen, Nijlen
- League: Belgian Division 2
- 2025–26: Belgian Division 2, VV B, 10th of 16
- Website: nijlen.voetbalassist.be
Home colours	Away colours

KFC Nijlen is a Belgian association football club based in Nijlen, in the province of Antwerp. Founded in 1927 as Fc Nijlen, the club has competed under its current name since 1997. It is affiliated to the Royal Belgian Football Association under matricule number 1065, and plays in blue and white.

== History ==
The first occurrence of a football club in Nijlen was in 1921, when Eendracht Nijlen joined the Belgian Football Association. It was a short-lived club, as it already disappeared in 1926, even before the introduction of matricule numbers.

=== FC Nijlen (1927–1965) ===
In 1927, a new club was founded, FC Nijlen, which was assigned matricule number 1065 and began playing in the regional leagues. One year later, several other football clubs were founded in Nijlen and affiliated with the Football Association, namely Groen Wit Nijlen (matricule number 1332), and Nijlen Sportvrienden (matricule number 1350). However FC Nijlen was the club that enjoyed the most success. In 1934, Groen Wit Nijlen was disbanded, and in 1937, FC Nijlen reached the lowest national level (the promotion series) for the first time, which was the third tier at that time.

FC Nijlen managed to hold its own well in the Promotion division during the following seasons. The other Nijlen club, Nijlen Sportvrienden, was disbanded during the Second World War, in 1942. After World War II, a new club emerged in Nijlen as FC Sportvrienden Nijlen was founded in 1946 (matricule number 436). Meanwhile, FC Nijlen remained successful in the Promotion division and finished in the sub-top for several consecutive seasons. In 1950, Nijlen finished second in its league, five points behind league winner Helzold FC Zolder. After another season in the sub-top, they finished third to last in the 1951–52 season. After conclusion of that season, major league reforms were implemented by the Belgian Football Association: a new Fourth Division was created and henceforth formed the promotion series. The number of clubs and series in the higher divisions was reduced. FC Nijlen was thus relegated, but continued to play national football in the new Fourth Division, where they remained for the following years. In 1957, the club received a royal (koninklijke) designation and the club name became KFC Nijlen. In 1958, they finished second to last, and thus, after two decades of national football, the club was relegated back to the Belgian Provincial Leagues.

=== KFC SV Nijlen (1965–1997) ===
In 1965, KFC Nijlen merged with the other Nijlen club, FC Sportvrienden Nijlen. The merged club was named KFC de Sportvrienden Nijlen (short: KFC SV Nijlen) and continued playing with FC Nijlen's matricule number 1065. In 1966, after eight years of provincial football, the club was able to return to the national promotion leagues. The merged club managed to maintain its position in the Fourth Division, and in 1968, they even finished second in the league, five points behind SC Maccabi Antwerpen . In the following years, they were unable to repeat this success, but the club continued to play in the mid-table. However, in 1972, together with Voorwaarts Tienen, they finished decisively in last place, and after six years of national football, the club dropped to the provincial leagues once again.

=== KFC Nijlen (since 1997) ===
In 1984, another new club was founded in Nijlen, Sporting Nijlen (matricule number 8946). After eight years of provincial football, FC SV Nijlen reached the national Fourth Division again in 1980. After a few seasons in the mid-table, Nijlen finished second to last in 1985, and after five years, they dropped back to the provincial leagues. In 1997, the younger Sporting Nijlen disappeared, while KFC SV Nijlen changed its name to KFC Nijlen. In 1998, the club reached the Fourth Division once more, but the stay lasted only one season, and the club was relegated back to the provincial leagues in 1999.

KFC Nijlen was promoted back to the First Provincial Division in 2014, after ten seasons in the Second Provincial Division. Just one year later, in 2015, the club managed to advance to the then Fourth Division (after which this was renamed Belgian Division 3 and dropped to tier 5 following another league reform). KFC Nijlen managed to maintain itself at this level for almost a decade and grew into a stable and ambitious team within national amateur football during that period. In 2025, the club made history by securing promotion to the Belgian Division 2 (tier 4) for the first time: after a strong regular season in which the team finished second, Nijlen secured promotion via the play-offs, where it took the decisive step with a spectacular 3–2 victory against Tempo Overijse, the third-placed team. During the 2026–27 Belgian Cup, Nijlen was the only club from the fourth tier to make it into the Seventh round, were they were drawn against reigning Belgian Cup holders Union SG after already having beaten Zepperen-Brustem, Wetteren, Flénu, and Rupel Boom.

== Known former players ==
- Raymond Ceulemans
- Yves De Winter (youth)
- Harald Pinxten
- Kenny Thompson
- Matthias Trenson
