= Kevin Franck =

Belgian footballer

Personal information
- Full name: Kevin Franck
- Date of birth: 10 June 1982 (age 44)
- Place of birth: Aalst, Belgium
- Height: 1.78 m (5 ft 10 in)
- Position: Midfielder

Youth career
- –1999: Eendracht Aalst
- 1999–2000: AA Gent

Senior career*
Years	Team	Apps	(Gls)
2000–2001	Real Madrid B		
2001–2002	RCD Mallorca B		
2002–2004	Denderleeuw	36	(8)
2004–2007	Dender	7	(0)
2007–2008	KVSK United		
2008–2009	Eendracht Aalst		
2009–2010	KSV Oudenaarde		
2010–2011	Londerzeel		
2012–2013	TK Meldert		
2013–2014	Gent-Zeehaven		
2014–2016	Rapid Lebbeke		
2016–2020	FC Mere		
- * Club domestic league appearances and goals

Kevin Franck (born 10 June 1982 in Aalst) is a retired Belgian football player.

== Career ==
He gained some notability for being a Belgian footballer to have played for Real Madrid, even though he never made it to the first team.

In the 2006-07 in Belgian football, he became second division champions with Dender, thus achieving promotion to the highest level of Belgian football. As Franck wasn't already certain of his place in the first team, he was transferred to KVSK United, who see him as the successor of former Anderlecht player Philip Haagdoren, who has now become KVSK United's coach.

Franck was transferred to Eendracht Aalst in the summer of 2008, after one year signed in June 2009 for KSV Oudenaarde.
