= RCS Onhaye =

Belgian football club

- Full name: Cercle Sportif Onhaye
- Founded: 1963; Matricule number 6626
- Ground: Terrain Onhaye; Onhaye
- 2025–26: Belgian Division 2 FFA, 1st of 16 (promoted)
- Website: rcsonhaye.be
Home colours

Royale Cercle Sportif Onhaye is a Belgian association football club based in Onhaye, Namur. The club has matricule number 6626 and the club's colors are red and white. They currently play in the Belgian Division 1, and play their home games at Terrain Onhaye in Onhaye.

== History ==
The club was founded in 1963 as Cercle Sportif Onhaye, commonly abbreviated as CS Onhaye. The club joined the Belgian FA and started at the lowest provincial level, back then the third provincial division.

Their first season did not go well, as their player-manager and local police officer Marcel Rihoux, was soon forbidden by his district chief from continuing his sporting duties. The championship proceeded without an official coach, and the team often conceded a flurry of goals. In their fourth season, a crowd of 400 saw them draw the final match 1-1 at home against Wanlin, resulting in Onhaye finishing second, just behind champions Wanlin. In 1968-69, under player-manager Pol Roeges, the club won the title in only its fifth season and thus gained promotion to the second provincial division (P2). Following this success, it also won the second provincial division title the following year and secured promotion to the first provincial division (P1), after achieving the remarkable feat of holding first place for 60 matches.

CS Onhaye continued to play at the highest provincial level for several seasons, before dropping down to P2 in 1974 and then to P3 in 1980. That year, the club moved to the current site, until then they had been playing in a nearby meadow. In 1986, CS Onhaye went back up to P2 before going down to P3 ten years later (1996) to return to P2 in 1999, and P1 in 2001. That year an additional building was constructed at the entrance to the complex, comprising two spacious changing rooms, a changing room for referees, a ticket office and a garage.

The Namur Provincial Cup was won twice, in 2004 and 2007, then, for the first time in its history, CS Onhaye reached the national level in 2013, which coincided with the 50th anniversary of the club, now bearing the title of "Royal" Cercle Sportif Onhaye, abbrevtiated RCS Onhaye. Two difficult seasons followed and the club dropped back down to the first provincial league for the 2015-16 season, which has been the last outside the national level. Onhaye promoted to the Belgian Third Amateur Division in 2016 via the promotion play-offs, spent one season in the Belgian Second Amateur Division in 2019-20, its highest ever level reached at that time, but immediately dropped back to the Belgian Division 3. In 2024 the club became champions in the Belgian Division 3, immediately becoming third in the level above. In 2026 they took the title in the Belgian Division 2 and will play the 2026-27 season in the Belgian Division 1, the highest level in their history and only one level below the professional tiers.
