= Flénu =

Sub-municipality of the city of Mons, Belgium

Flénu Flinnu (Walloon)
- Sub-municipality of Mons
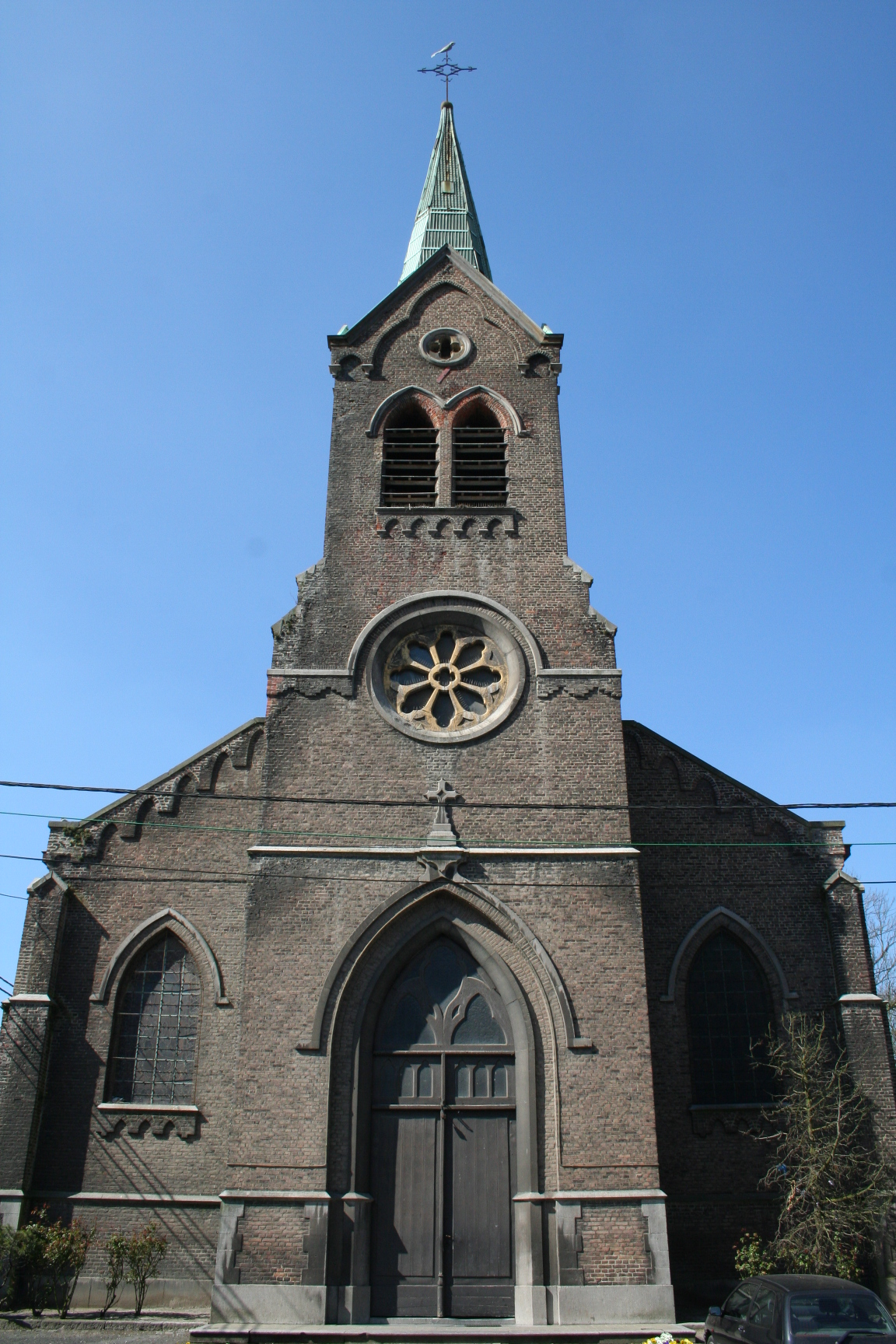
- Sainte-Barbe Church

- Location of Flénu in Mons
- Interactive map of Flénu
- Location within Belgium Location within Hainaut (Belgium)
- Coordinates: 50°26′12″N 3°53′15″E
- Country: Belgium
- Community: French Community
- Region: Wallonia
- Province: Hainaut
- Arrondissement: Mons
- Municipality: Mons

Area
  - Total: 3.86 km^{2} (1.49 sq mi)

Population (2020-01-01)
  - Total: 5,669
  - Density: 1,470/km^{2} (3,800/sq mi)
- Postal codes: 7012
- Area codes: 065

Flénu (French pronunciation: [fleny]; Walloon: Flinnu) is a sub-municipality of the city of Mons located in the province of Hainaut, Wallonia, Belgium. The municipality of Flénu was formed on 8 June 1870, when it was detached from the municipality of Jemappes. In 1971, Flénu was merged into Jemappes. On 1 January 1977, Jemappes was merged into Mons.
