= 2026–27 Belgian Division 3 =

Belgian Division 3
- Season: 2026–27
- Dates: August 2026 – May 2027

The 2026–27 Belgian Division 3 is the eleventh season of the division in its current format, placed at the fifth tier of football in Belgium.

== Format changes ==
The 2026–27 season will be the final season under the current format for the FFA (Francophone) side of the division. Starting from the 2027–28 season, the FFA league will be restructured from two parallel series into three groups of twelve teams. These groups will subsequently split into two play-off groups of six, mirroring the format currently used in Division 1 FFA.

To facilitate the expansion of Division 2 FFA from approximately 18 to 24 clubs (two series of 12) in 2027–28, additional teams will need to be promoted from Division 3. It is expected that between 6 and 8 teams will be promoted at the end of the season. Additionally, relegation from Division 3 to the Provincial Leagues will be flexible, with potentially only 1 to 4 teams relegated across the FFA divisions, to maintain the target of 36 clubs in Division 3.

The exact number of promotions and relegations will depend on several variables, including the number of French-speaking clubs relegated from the Challenger Pro League (D1B), movements between Division 1 FFA and Division 2, administrative decisions, and clubs meeting licensing and stadium criteria.

== Team changes ==
=== Out ===
==== Promoted to the 2026–27 Belgian Division 2 ====
- Tempo Overijse (VV A Champions)
- De Kempen (VV B Champions)
- Stade Mouscronnois (FFA A Champions)
- Eupen U23 (FFA B Champions)
- Wilrijk (Promoted via VV play-offs)
- Eendracht Aalst Lede (Promoted via VV play-offs)
- Voorde-Appelterre (Promoted via VV play-offs)
- Union Saint-Ghislain Tertre Hautrage (Promoted via FFA play-offs)

==== Relegated to the Belgian Provincial Leagues ====
- From VV A: Boezinge, Fenixx BeigHum and Berlare.
- From VV B: Zwarte Leeuw, Haasdonk and Turkse Rangers.
- From FFA A: Aische, Condruzien, Loyers and Jodoigne.
- From FFA B: Houffalize, Marloie Sport, Eupen 1963 and Harre-Manhay.

==== Removed from competition ====
- La Louviere Centre

=== In ===
==== Relegated from the 2025–26 Belgian Division 2 ====
- Westhoek (now playing as Ieper), Gullegem, Berchem Sport, Berg en Dal, Raeren-Eynatten, Sporting Bruxelles and Tournai.
- Note: Raeren-Eynatten finished in eighth place last season but chose to voluntarily relegate to the Provincial Leagues. Tournai fell into administration and will also be relegated to the Provincial Leagues.

==== Promoted from the Belgian Provincial Leagues ====
- VV: Avanti Stekene, FC ATO, Betekom, Bree-Beek, Linden, Nieuwmoer and Zwevegem.
- FFA: Léopold, Molenbaix, Soignies, USC Jemappes, SC Néchin, FC Ans, Habay-la-Neuve U23, Longlier, Malmedy, Rochefort U23 and Tilff.

==== U23 team added ====
- Lommel U23

== Belgian Division 3 VV A ==
Locations of the 2026–27 Belgian Division 3 VV A teams

=== League table ===
| Pos | Team | Pld | W | D | L | GF | GA | GD | Pts | Qualification or relegation |
|---|---|---|---|---|---|---|---|---|---|---|
| 1 | Gullegem | 12 | 9 | 2 | 1 | 33 | 11 | +22 | 29 | Promotion to the 2027–28 Belgian Division 2 |
| 2 | Ieper (T) | 12 | 8 | 2 | 2 | 32 | 16 | +16 | 26 | Qualification for the Promotion play-offs VV |
| 3 | Rumbeke | 12 | 8 | 0 | 4 | 28 | 17 | +11 | 24 | Qualification for the Promotion play-offs VV |
| 4 | City Pirates | 12 | 7 | 3 | 2 | 30 | 14 | +16 | 24 | Qualification for the Promotion play-offs VV |
| 5 | Olsa Brakel | 12 | 7 | 3 | 2 | 19 | 12 | +7 | 24 | Qualification for the Promotion play-offs VV |
| 6 | WS Lauwe | 12 | 5 | 4 | 3 | 19 | 15 | +4 | 19 | |
| 7 | Avanti Stekene | 12 | 6 | 0 | 6 | 21 | 14 | +7 | 18 | |
| 8 | Elene-Grotenberge | 12 | 5 | 3 | 4 | 24 | 20 | +4 | 18 | |
| 9 | Blankenberge | 12 | 5 | 3 | 4 | 23 | 20 | +3 | 18 | |
| 10 | Drongen | 12 | 4 | 2 | 6 | 15 | 16 | −1 | 14 | |
| 11 | St Denijs Sport | 12 | 4 | 2 | 6 | 14 | 20 | −6 | 14 | |
| 12 | Erpe-Mere United | 12 | 4 | 1 | 7 | 12 | 15 | −3 | 13 | |
| 13 | Zwevegem | 12 | 4 | 1 | 7 | 16 | 25 | −9 | 13 | |
| 14 | Berchem Sport | 12 | 3 | 2 | 7 | 16 | 21 | −5 | 11 | Relegation to the 2027–28 Belgian Provincial Leagues |
| 15 | Wambeek-Ternat | 12 | 1 | 1 | 10 | 7 | 40 | −33 | 4 | Relegation to the 2027–28 Belgian Provincial Leagues |
| 16 | Elewijt | 12 | 0 | 3 | 9 | 8 | 41 | −33 | 3 | Relegation to the 2027–28 Belgian Provincial Leagues |

Updated to match(es) played on 15 November 2026. Source: Voetbal Vlaanderen
Rules for classification: 1) Points; 2) Matches won; 3) Goal difference; 4) Goals scored; 5) Away matches won; 6) Goal difference in away matches; 7) Away goals scored.
(T) Qualified, but not yet for the particular phase indicated

=== Period champions ===
| Period | Matchdays | Champion |
|---|---|---|
| 1 | 1–10 | Ieper (Note: Ieper and Gullegem both finished the first period on 23 points with seven wins; Ieper took the period title on goal difference (+19 against +17).) |
| 2 | 11–20 | To be determined |
| 3 | 21–30 | To be determined |

=== Results ===
| Home \ Away | AVA | BER | BLA | BRA | CIP | DRO | E-G | ELE | E-M | GUL | IEP | LAU | RUM | STD | W-T | ZWE |
|---|---|---|---|---|---|---|---|---|---|---|---|---|---|---|---|---|
| Avanti Stekene | — | | | 0–1 | | | 1–2 | 3–0 | | | | | 3–1 | | 3–1 | 2–0 |
| Berchem Sport | | — | 0–3 | | 1–2 | | 3–1 | | | | 2–3 | 1–2 | | | 4–0 | |
| Blankenberge | 2–1 | | — | | 3–4 | | | | 0–0 | 2–3 | 0–2 | | | | 2–1 | |
| Olsa Brakel | | | 3–3 | — | 1–0 | | 3–0 | | 1–0 | | | | 2–0 | 2–1 | | |
| City Pirates | 1–0 | | | | — | 1–1 | | | | | 4–0 | 1–1 | 3–2 | | 9–0 | |
| Drongen | | 2–0 | 0–3 | 0–1 | | — | 0–2 | | | | | | | 1–1 | | 2–0 |
| Elene-Grotenberge | | | | | 2–2 | | — | 7–0 | 2–0 | 1–1 | | 3–3 | | | 4–1 | |
| Elewijt | | 1–3 | 2–2 | | | 0–1 | | — | | 0–2 | | 2–2 | | 0–3 | | |
| Erpe-Mere United | 2–0 | 1–0 | | | 0–1 | 0–4 | | 5–0 | — | | | | 0–3 | | | |
| Gullegem | 3–0 | 1–1 | | 2–1 | | 5–3 | | | 2–1 | — | 2–0 | | | | | |
| Ieper | | | | 1–1 | | 1–0 | | 7–1 | | | — | 1–1 | | 4–1 | | 4–1 |
| WS Lauwe | 0–2 | | | 2–0 | | | | | 2–1 | | | — | 1–2 | 1–0 | | 0–2 |
| Rumbeke | | 5–1 | 2–0 | | | | 2–0 | 5–1 | | | 2–5 | | — | | | 2–1 |
| St Denijs Sport | 1–6 | 0–0 | 2–3 | | | | | | | 2–1 | | | 0–2 | — | | 1–0 |
| Wambeek-Ternat | | | | | | 2–1 | | 1–1 | | 0–4 | 1–4 | 0–4 | | 0–2 | — | |
| Zwevegem | | | | 3–3 | 3–2 | | 4–0 | | 0–2 | 0–7 | | | | | 2–0 | — |

Updated to match(es) played on 15 November 2026. Source: RBFA
Legend: Blue = home team win; Yellow = draw; Red = away team win.

== Belgian Division 3 VV B ==
Locations of the 2026–27 Belgian Division 3 VV B teams

=== League table ===
| Pos | Team | Pld | W | D | L | GF | GA | GD | Pts | Qualification or relegation |
|---|---|---|---|---|---|---|---|---|---|---|
| 1 | Wezel Sport (T) | 14 | 10 | 2 | 2 | 44 | 13 | +31 | 32 | Promotion to the 2027–28 Belgian Division 2 |
| 2 | Turnhout | 13 | 8 | 1 | 4 | 37 | 23 | +14 | 25 | Qualification for the Promotion play-offs VV |
| 3 | Zepperen-Brustem | 13 | 8 | 1 | 4 | 30 | 18 | +12 | 25 | Qualification for the Promotion play-offs VV |
| 4 | Sint-Lenaarts | 13 | 8 | 1 | 4 | 26 | 21 | +5 | 25 | Qualification for the Promotion play-offs VV |
| 5 | Achel | 13 | 7 | 3 | 3 | 27 | 10 | +17 | 24 | Qualification for the Promotion play-offs VV |
| 6 | Bree-Beek | 13 | 6 | 3 | 4 | 18 | 14 | +4 | 21 | |
| 7 | Berg en Dal | 14 | 6 | 2 | 6 | 25 | 23 | +2 | 20 | |
| 8 | Huldenberg | 13 | 5 | 4 | 4 | 18 | 18 | 0 | 19 | |
| 9 | Geel | 14 | 5 | 4 | 5 | 18 | 24 | −6 | 19 | |
| 10 | Betekom | 13 | 5 | 2 | 6 | 16 | 20 | −4 | 17 | |
| 11 | Schoonbeek-Beverst | 13 | 4 | 5 | 4 | 29 | 27 | +2 | 17 | |
| 12 | Esperanza Pelt | 13 | 5 | 1 | 7 | 15 | 32 | −17 | 16 | |
| 13 | FC ATO | 13 | 5 | 0 | 8 | 27 | 33 | −6 | 15 | |
| 14 | Linden | 13 | 4 | 1 | 8 | 24 | 38 | −14 | 13 | |
| 15 | Nieuwmoer | 13 | 3 | 3 | 7 | 20 | 28 | −8 | 12 | Relegation to the 2027–28 Belgian Provincial Leagues |
| 16 | Lommel U23^{U23} | 13 | 3 | 0 | 10 | 11 | 29 | −18 | 9 | Relegation to the 2027–28 Belgian Provincial Leagues |
| 17 | Lille | 13 | 2 | 3 | 8 | 13 | 27 | −14 | 9 | Relegation to the 2027–28 Belgian Provincial Leagues |

Updated to match(es) played on 15 November 2026. Source: Voetbal Vlaanderen
Rules for classification: 1) Points; 2) Matches won; 3) Goal difference; 4) Goals scored; 5) Away matches won; 6) Goal difference in away matches; 7) Away goals scored.
(T) Qualified, but not yet for the particular phase indicated

=== Period champions ===
| Period | Matchdays | Champion |
|---|---|---|
| 1 | 1–10 | Wezel Sport |
| 2 | 11–22 | To be determined |
| 3 | 23–34 | To be determined |

=== Results ===
| Home \ Away | WEZ | ZEP | STL | BET | LIN | PEL | NEW | HUL | GEE | ACH | TUR | B-D | ATO | B-B | S-B | LIL | LOM^{U23} |
|---|---|---|---|---|---|---|---|---|---|---|---|---|---|---|---|---|---|
| Wezel Sport | — | | | | 4–1 | 4–0 | 1–2 | 5–1 | | 2–2 | 4–0 | | | | | 2–1 | |
| Zepperen-Brustem | | — | 6–3 | | | | 1–0 | 2–0 | 1–1 | | | | 5–1 | | 3–1 | | |
| Sint-Lenaarts | | | — | 2–0 | | 2–0 | | 1–2 | | 1–1 | | | 2–0 | | | | 2–1 |
| Betekom | 1–5 | | | — | | | 3–1 | | 2–1 | 0–3 | 0–0 | 3–2 | | | | 0–1 | |
| Linden | | | 3–2 | 1–3 | — | 0–2 | | | 2–2 | | | | | 2–4 | 3–4 | | |
| Esperanza Pelt | | 0–3 | | 2–1 | | — | | | | 2–0 | | | | 1–0 | 3–3 | 0–2 | |
| Nieuwmoer | | | 0–2 | | 3–2 | 1–3 | — | | | | | | | 2–2 | 3–2 | 3–3 | |
| Huldenberg | | | | | | 4–1 | 1–1 | — | | | 0–3 | | | 1–2 | 2–2 | | 4–1 |
| Geel | 0–5 | | | | | | 3–2 | 0–0 | — | 0–2 | | 1–0 | | 1–0 | 3–0 | 2–2 | |
| Achel | | 2–0 | | | 6–0 | | | 0–0 | | — | 0–2 | 1–0 | 5–1 | | | | 0–1 |
| Turnhout | | 3–1 | 4–5 | | | 7–1 | 2–1 | | 5–1 | | — | | | | | | 1–0 |
| Berg en Dal | 1–4 | 3–2 | | | 5–3 | | 3–1 | 0–2 | | | 3–1 | — | 1–2 | | | | |
| FC ATO | 2–1 | | | | 1–2 | 5–0 | | 0–1 | 1–2 | | 3–7 | | — | | | 6–1 | |
| Bree-Beek | 1–3 | 2–1 | 0–2 | 1–0 | | | | | | | | 1–1 | | — | 0–0 | | 4–0 |
| Schoonbeek-Beverst | 1–1 | | 4–0 | 1–1 | | | | | | | 4–2 | 2–4 | 5–2 | | — | | |
| Lille | | 0–2 | 0–2 | | 1–2 | | | | | 1–5 | | 0–0 | | 0–1 | | — | 1–2 |
| Lommel U23^{U23} | 0–3 | 2–3 | | 0–2 | 1–3 | | | | 2–1 | | | 0–2 | 1–3 | | | | — |

Updated to match(es) played on 15 November 2026. Source: RBFA
Legend: Blue = home team win; Yellow = draw; Red = away team win.

== Belgian Division 3 FFA A ==
Locations of the 2026–27 Belgian Division 3 FFA A teams

Due to ongoing court proceedings, the FFA made the decision to postpone the start of the Belgian Division 3 FFA season. As a result the season will only start from Matchday 3.

=== League table ===
| Pos | Team | Pld | W | D | L | GF | GA | GD | Pts | Qualification or relegation |
|---|---|---|---|---|---|---|---|---|---|---|
| 1 | Arquet (T) | 12 | 9 | 2 | 1 | 26 | 14 | +12 | 29 | Promotion to the 2027–28 Belgian Division 2 |
| 2 | FC Kosova Schaerbeek | 12 | 7 | 2 | 3 | 27 | 11 | +16 | 23 | Promotion to the 2027–28 Belgian Division 2 |
| 3 | Evelette-Jallet | 12 | 6 | 5 | 1 | 28 | 23 | +5 | 23 | Qualification for the Promotion play-offs FFA (Note: Due to the restructuring of the FFA divisions for the 2027–28 season, there will be 6, 7, 8, or 9 teams promoted to Division 2 and only 1, 2 or 3 teams relegated to the Provincial Leagues. Final qualification spots will be determined by movements in the higher divisions.) |
| 4 | Ciney | 12 | 7 | 1 | 4 | 17 | 20 | −3 | 22 | Qualification for the Promotion play-offs FFA |
| 5 | Léopold | 12 | 6 | 3 | 3 | 24 | 18 | +6 | 21 | Qualification for the Promotion play-offs FFA |
| 6 | Molenbaix | 12 | 5 | 4 | 3 | 20 | 17 | +3 | 19 | Qualification for the Promotion play-offs FFA |
| 7 | Soignies | 12 | 5 | 4 | 3 | 21 | 20 | +1 | 19 | |
| 8 | Buzet | 12 | 4 | 5 | 3 | 25 | 21 | +4 | 17 | |
| 9 | Néchin | 11 | 4 | 4 | 3 | 24 | 18 | +6 | 16 | |
| 10 | Biesme | 11 | 4 | 3 | 4 | 17 | 14 | +3 | 15 | |
| 11 | Rochefort U23^{U23} | 12 | 3 | 4 | 5 | 17 | 22 | −5 | 13 | |
| 12 | Stade Everois | 12 | 3 | 1 | 8 | 23 | 28 | −5 | 10 | |
| 13 | Sporting Bruxelles | 12 | 3 | 1 | 8 | 11 | 21 | −10 | 10 | |
| 14 | USC Jemappes | 12 | 2 | 4 | 6 | 16 | 24 | −8 | 10 | |
| 15 | Monceau | 12 | 2 | 3 | 7 | 16 | 29 | −13 | 9 | Possible relegation to the 2027–28 Belgian Provincial Leagues |
| 16 | Saint-Michel | 12 | 0 | 4 | 8 | 12 | 24 | −12 | 4 | Possible relegation to the 2027–28 Belgian Provincial Leagues |

Updated to match(es) played on 15 November 2026. Source: D3 FFA série A
Rules for classification: 1) Points; 2) Matches won; 3) Goal difference; 4) Goals scored; 5) Away matches won; 6) Goal difference in away matches; 7) Away goals scored.
(T) Qualified, but not yet for the particular phase indicated

=== Period champions ===
| Period | Matchdays | Champion |
|---|---|---|
| 1 | 1–10 | Arquet |
| 2 | 11–20 | To be determined |
| 3 | 21–30 | To be determined |

=== Results ===
| Home \ Away | ARQ | BIE | BUZ | CIN | E-J | EVE | JEM | KOS | LEO | MOL | MON | NEC | ROC | SOI | SPB | STM |
|---|---|---|---|---|---|---|---|---|---|---|---|---|---|---|---|---|
| Arquet | — | | | | | | | 1–0 | 2–2 | 1–1 | | 3–1 | | 1–3 | | 3–2 |
| Biesme | 1–2 | — | | | 1–2 | | 6–1 | | | | 2–2 | | 0–1 | | 1–0 | |
| Buzet | 1–2 | | — | | 3–3 | | 4–2 | | | | 4–1 | | 3–3 | | 2–0 | |
| Ciney | | | 3–3 | — | | 2–1 | | 2–1 | 0–3 | | | 0–5 (Note: The match was not played after the referee ruled the artificial pitch non-compliant because of a raised section of turf near the halfway line. The FFA disciplinary commission awarded a 5–0 forfeit win to Néchin, and Ciney's appeal was rejected by the FFA appeal committee on 29 October 2026.) | | 2–1 | | 2–1 |
| Evelette-Jallet | | | | 2–1 | — | 2–1 | 2–1 | | | | 2–1 | | 1–1 | | 2–0 | |
| Stade Everois | | 1–2 | | | | — | | 2–1 | 1–2 | | | 3–3 | | 5–0 | | 4–2 |
| USC Jemappes | 1–3 | | | 1–2 | | 3–0 | — | | | 1–1 | 2–1 | 1–1 | | | | |
| FC Kosova Schaerbeek | | | 4–1 | | | | 1–0 | — | | 3–1 | 6–0 | | 4–0 | | 2–0 | |
| Léopold | | 0–0 | 1–0 | | 6–4 | | | 1–2 | — | | | 0–3 | 4–0 | | | |
| Molenbaix | | 1–2 | | | 2–2 | 3–1 | | | 3–1 | — | | | 2–1 | 1–3 | 2–0 | |
| Monceau | 0–2 | | | 1–2 | | | | | 2–3 | 1–1 | — | 3–2 | | | | 2–1 |
| Néchin | | | 1–3 | | 3–3 | | | 2–2 | | | | — | | | | 1–0 |
| Rochefort U23 | 2–3 | | | 0–1 | | 4–1 | 1–1 | | | | | | — | 2–2 | 2–0 | |
| Soignies | | 3–1 | 1–1 | | 3–3 | | | | 1–1 | | | 0–2 | | — | | 2–1 |
| Sporting Bruxelles | 0–3 | | | 1–0 | | 4–3 | | | | | 2–2 | | | 0–2 | — | |
| Saint-Michel | | 1–1 | 0–0 | | | | 2–2 | 1–1 | | 1–2 | | | | | 0–4 | — |

Updated to match(es) played on 15 November 2026. Source: RBFA
Legend: Blue = home team win; Yellow = draw; Red = away team win.

== Belgian Division 3 FFA B ==
Locations of the 2026–27 Belgian Division 3 FFA B teams

=== League table ===
| Pos | Team | Pld | W | D | L | GF | GA | GD | Pts | Qualification or relegation |
|---|---|---|---|---|---|---|---|---|---|---|
| 1 | Elsautoise (T) | 12 | 10 | 2 | 0 | 39 | 9 | +30 | 32 | Promotion to the 2027–28 Belgian Division 2 |
| 2 | Verlaine | 12 | 8 | 4 | 0 | 21 | 3 | +18 | 28 | Promotion to the 2027–28 Belgian Division 2 |
| 3 | Aubel | 12 | 8 | 1 | 3 | 17 | 10 | +7 | 25 | Qualification for the Promotion play-offs FFA (Note: Due to the restructuring of the FFA divisions for the 2027–28 season, there will be 6, 7, 8, or 9 teams promoted to Division 2 and only 1, 2 or 3 teams relegated to the Provincial Leagues. Final qualification spots will be determined by movements in the higher divisions.) |
| 4 | Libramontois | 12 | 7 | 1 | 4 | 19 | 14 | +5 | 22 | Qualification for the Promotion play-offs FFA |
| 5 | Malmedy | 12 | 5 | 5 | 2 | 19 | 14 | +5 | 20 | Qualification for the Promotion play-offs FFA |
| 6 | Sprimont | 12 | 6 | 1 | 5 | 21 | 16 | +5 | 19 | Qualification for the Promotion play-offs FFA |
| 7 | FC Ans | 12 | 5 | 4 | 3 | 26 | 24 | +2 | 19 | |
| 8 | Momalloise | 12 | 5 | 1 | 6 | 23 | 17 | +6 | 16 | |
| 9 | Messancy | 12 | 5 | 1 | 6 | 14 | 17 | −3 | 16 | |
| 10 | Habay-la-Neuve U23^{U23} | 12 | 4 | 3 | 5 | 18 | 18 | 0 | 15 | |
| 11 | Du Geer | 12 | 4 | 2 | 6 | 19 | 22 | −3 | 14 | |
| 12 | Meix-dt-Virton | 12 | 3 | 3 | 6 | 9 | 17 | −8 | 12 | |
| 13 | Stade Waremmien | 12 | 3 | 2 | 7 | 16 | 29 | −13 | 11 | |
| 14 | Mormont | 12 | 2 | 3 | 7 | 19 | 25 | −6 | 9 | |
| 15 | Longlier | 12 | 2 | 2 | 8 | 13 | 28 | −15 | 8 | Possible relegation to the 2027–28 Belgian Provincial Leagues |
| 16 | Tilff | 12 | 0 | 3 | 9 | 12 | 42 | −30 | 3 | Possible relegation to the 2027–28 Belgian Provincial Leagues |

Updated to match(es) played on 15 November 2026. Source: D3 FFA série B
Rules for classification: 1) Points; 2) Matches won; 3) Goal difference; 4) Goals scored; 5) Away matches won; 6) Goal difference in away matches; 7) Away goals scored.
(T) Qualified, but not yet for the particular phase indicated

=== Period champions ===
| Period | Matchdays | Champion |
|---|---|---|
| 1 | 1–10 | Elsautoise |
| 2 | 11–20 | To be determined |
| 3 | 21–30 | To be determined |

=== Results ===
| Home \ Away | ANS | AUB | DUG | ELS | HLN | LIB | LON | MAL | MEI | MES | MOM | MOR | SPR | TIL | VER | WAR |
|---|---|---|---|---|---|---|---|---|---|---|---|---|---|---|---|---|
| FC Ans | — | 4–1 | 3–3 | 1–2 | | | 1–1 | 2–2 | | | | 3–0 | | | | |
| Aubel | | — | | | | 1–2 | 3–0 | 1–0 | 2–0 | 1–0 | | | 1–1 | | 0–2 | |
| Du Geer | | 0–1 | — | | 2–0 | | | | 1–3 | | 0–1 | | | 4–2 | 0–2 | |
| Elsautoise | | | 5–1 | — | 4–0 | 4–2 | | | | | | 4–1 | 3–1 | | | |
| Habay-la-Neuve U23 | 4–0 | | | | — | | | | 0–0 | | 2–1 | | 3–4 | 4–0 | 0–2 | |
| Libramontois | 2–4 | | | | | — | | | 2–0 | | 1–0 | | 0–2 | 3–1 | 0–0 | |
| Longlier | | | 0–2 | 0–4 | 3–1 | 1–2 | — | | 1–2 | | | | 0–2 | | | |
| Malmedy | | | | 1–1 | 1–1 | 1–0 | 5–2 | — | | | | 3–2 | 1–0 | | | |
| Meix-dt-Virton | 1–4 | | | | | | | 0–0 | — | 0–2 | | | | 3–1 | 0–0 | 0–3 |
| Messancy | | | 2–1 | 0–1 | | 0–2 | 1–2 | 2–1 | | — | | 3–2 | | | | |
| Momalloise | 2–3 | 0–1 | | 0–2 | | | 3–1 | | | | — | 1–2 | | | | 7–2 |
| Mormont | | 1–2 | 2–2 | | 1–1 | 0–3 | | | | | | — | | 6–0 | 1–2 | |
| Sprimont | | | | | | | | | 1–0 | 0–2 | 1–3 | | — | 6–2 | 0–1 | 3–0 |
| Tilff | 1–1 | 0–3 | | 2–2 | | | | | | 2–2 | 1–4 | | | — | | 0–4 |
| Verlaine | 5–0 | | | | | | | 1–1 | | 4–0 | 1–1 | | | | — | 1–0 |
| Stade Waremmien | | | 1–3 | 0–7 | 0–2 | | 2–2 | 2–3 | | 1–0 | | 1–1 | | | | — |

Updated to match(es) played on 15 November 2026. Source: RBFA
Legend: Blue = home team win; Yellow = draw; Red = away team win.
