= KRC Harelbeke (2016) =

Belgian football club

- Full name: Koninklijke Racing Club Harelbeke
- Nickname: De Ratten (The Rats)
- Founded: 1930; 96 years ago as KSV Ingelmunster; 2003; 23 years ago as Sporting West Harelbeke; 2016; 10 years ago as KRC Harelbeke
- Ground: Stedelijk Forestiersstadion, Harelbeke
- Capacity: 10,000
- Chairman: Nico Daenens
- Manager: Kevin Franck
- League: Belgian Division 1
- 2025–26: Belgian Division 2 VV A, 8th of 16 (promoted via play-offs)
- Website: krcharelbeke.be
Home colours	Away colours

Koninklijke Racing Club Harelbeke, commonly known as KRC Harelbeke, is a Belgian football club based in Harelbeke, West Flanders. It traces its registration to KSV Ingelmunster, founded in 1930 in the neighbouring town of Ingelmunster, and assumed Harelbeke's footballing role in 2002 after absorbing the town's recently defunct club, KRC Zuid-West-Vlaanderen (formerly KRC Harelbeke). The club subsequently played under several names—Sporting West Ingelmunster-Harelbeke, then Sporting West Harelbeke—before adopting the name KRC Harelbeke in 2016. It plays at the Stedelijk Forestiersstadion, which it shares with SWL Harelbeke. As of the 2025–26 season the club plays in Belgian Division 1, the third tier of Belgian football.

== History ==
=== Origins and the 2002 merger ===
The football club now called KRC Harelbeke originates not in Harelbeke but in nearby Ingelmunster, where KSV Ingelmunster was founded in 1930. It took over the role of Harelbeke's football club in 2002, when it merged with the town's existing side. That club, which had been renamed KRC Zuid-West-Vlaanderen after its relegation in 2001, had previously spent six seasons in the top division between 1995 and 2001—achieving a best finish of fifth in 1997–98 and a UEFA Intertoto Cup appearance—before financial problems led to its liquidation. In the merger the matricule of the former top-flight club was dissolved, and the combined side continued under the Ingelmunster registration, moving into Harelbeke's Forestiersstadion.

=== Decline and recovery (2002–2016) ===
Sporting West's logo from 2008–16

The merged club initially competed in the Second Division but struggled, and after its principal backer, Willy Callens, withdrew his support it went into a sharp decline, dropping as far as the provincial leagues by 2008. Playing under the name Sporting West Harelbeke, it won immediate promotion from the first provincial division on the final matchday; following a further relegation and promotion, it had returned to the national fourth tier by 2011. In 2016 the club adopted the name Racing Club Harelbeke (KRC Harelbeke), taking on the name, colours and identity of the former top-flight club that had disappeared a decade and a half earlier.

=== KRC Harelbeke (since 2016) ===
In the 2025–26 season the club competed in Belgian Division 2. Despite finishing eighth of sixteen, it secured a surprise promotion to the third-tier Belgian Division 1 through the end-of-season promotion play-offs.

== Stadium ==
KRC Harelbeke plays its home matches at the Stedelijk Forestiersstadion in Harelbeke, which has a capacity of 10,000 and which it shares with SWL Harelbeke.

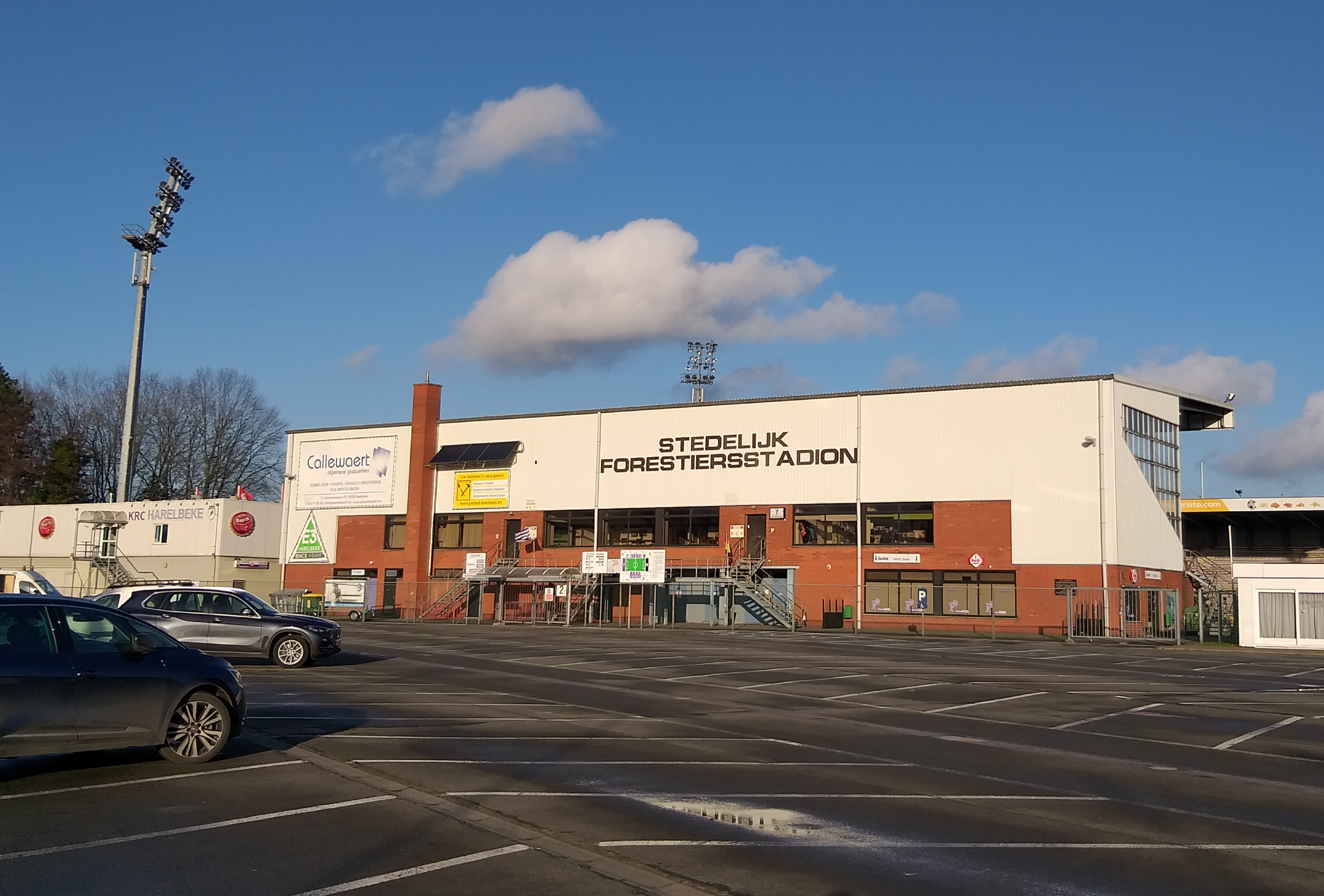
The Stedelijk Forestiersstadion, home ground of KRC Harelbeke from the outside

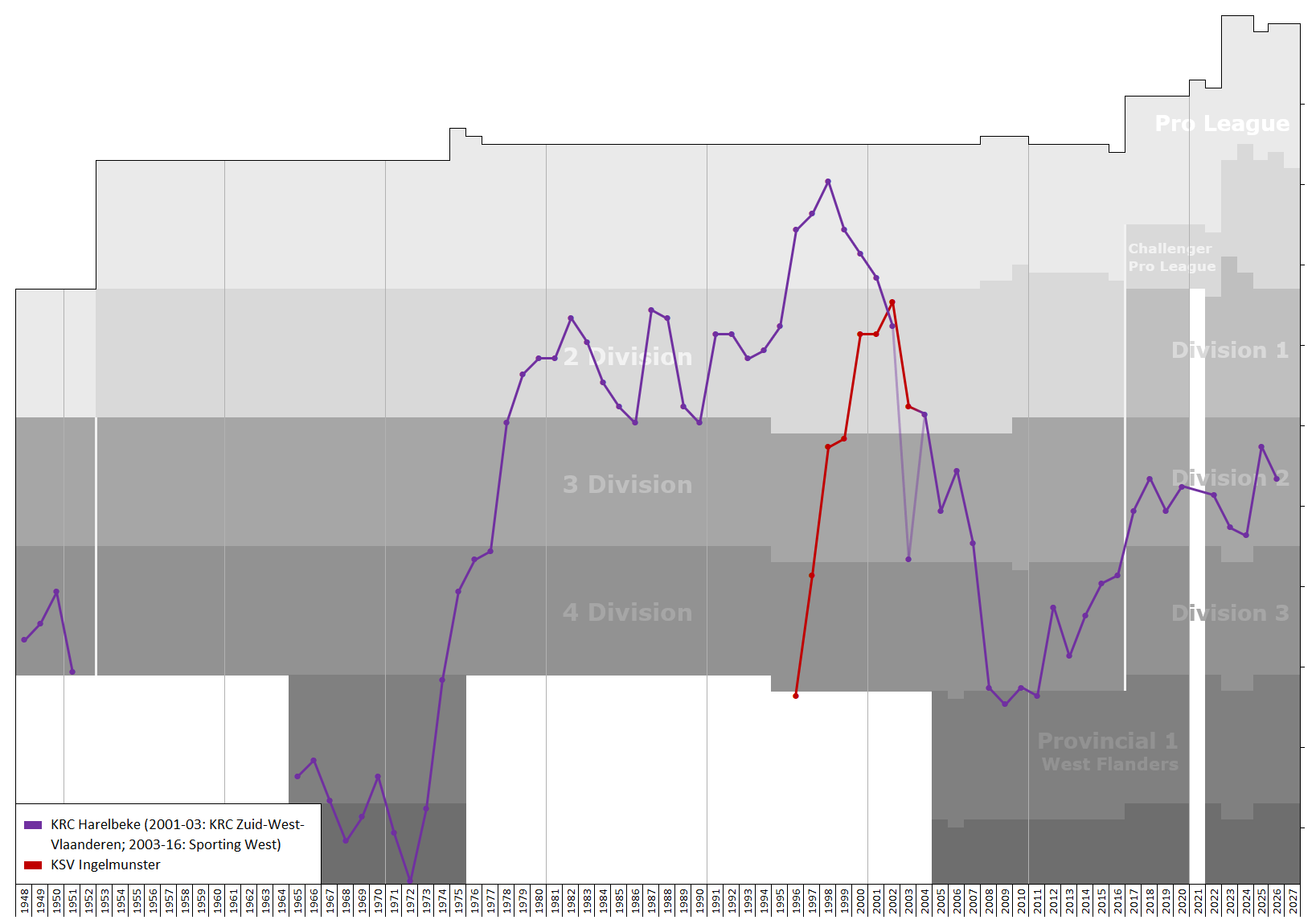
Historical chart of KRC Harelbeke and its predecessors' league performance
