= Holly Tshimanga =

Belgian footballer (born 1997)

Personal information
- Full name: Holly Christian Tshimanga Kanyinda
- Date of birth: 25 April 1997 (age 29)
- Place of birth: Duffel, Belgium
- Position: Left winger

Team information
- Current team: Londerzeel
- Number: 7

Youth career
- –2016: Genk

Senior career*
Years	Team	Apps	(Gls)
2016–2018	Genk	1	(0)
2018–2019	Austria Klagenfurt	2	(0)
2019	ASV Geel	1	(0)
2019–2020	Patro Eisden	3	(0)
2020–2022	Rupel Boom	18	(1)
2022–2024	Cappellen	53	(8)
2024–	Londerzeel	29	(14)

International career
2012	Belgium U15	2	(1)
2012–2013	Belgium U16	12	(5)
2013	Belgium U17	5	(0)
2014–2015	Belgium U18	5	(1)
2015	Belgium U19	7	(1)
- * Club domestic league appearances and goals as of 02:33, 26 January 2026 (UTC)

Holly Christian Tshimanga Kanyinda (born 25 April 1997) is a Belgian professional footballer who plays as a winger for Londerzeel.

== Career ==
Tshimanga played with Genk as a junior. He made his first team debut with K.R.C. Genk in the UEFA Europa League on 4 August 2016 against Cork City.

== Personal life ==
Born in Belgium to parents of Congolese descent, Holly is the younger brother of Belgium international Derrick Tshimanga.
