= Bocholt VV =

Belgium football club

Bocholt VV Bocholt
- Full name: Koninklijke Bocholter Voetbalvereniging
- Founded: 1923; 103 years ago
- Ground: Damburgstadion, Bocholt
- Capacity: 3,062
- Chairman: Martens Fons
- Head coach: Aziz Moutawakil
- League: Belgian Division 2
- 2025–26: Belgian Division 2 VV B, 6th of 16
- Website: bocholtvv.be
Home colours	Away colours

Koninklijke Bocholter Voetbalvereniging, known as K. Bocholter V.V. or simply Bocholt VV is a Belgian football club based in the municipality of Bocholt, registered with the Royal Belgian Football Association under matricule 595. The full name of the club is Koninklijke Bocholter Voetbalvereniging (Royal Bocholt Football Association) and it has white and black as club colours. The club has played most of its time in the Belgian Provincial Leagues, but managed to climb up to the national level towards the end of the 20th century.

== History ==
The club was founded in 1923 as Bocholter Voetbalvereniging by a group of football enthusiasts from Bocholt, Limburg. It affiliated with the Royal Belgian Football Association during the 1924–25 season and entered competitive football in the provincial leagues in the 1925–26 season, starting at Fourth Provincial level, which at the time constituted the seventh tier of the Belgian football league system.

Bocholt progressed steadily through the provincial divisions and achieved promotion to the national leagues for the first time in the 1930–31 season by qualifying for Promotion. Promotion was secured after a test match victory against Hoeselt, played at the ground of Thor Waterschei and reportedly attended by more than 3,000 spectators. The club's first spell at national level lasted a single season, after which it was relegated back to the provincial leagues.

The club spent much of the following decades alternating between divisions at provincial level, with competitive football suspended during the World War II years. A period of renewed success followed in the late 1950s under player-coach Ben Korver. In the 1956–57 season, Bocholt won the First Provincial title by a considerable margin, establishing itself as one of the leading clubs in the Limburg region. During this period, the club received the honorary designation Koninklijke, adopting the name Koninklijke Bocholter Voetbalvereniging.

Bocholt returned to the national divisions in the early 1960s, earning promotion to Promotion—by then the fourth tier—in the 1961–62 season. This second national spell proved relatively brief, with relegation following the 1963–64 campaign. The club subsequently entered a prolonged period in the lower provincial divisions, including an extended stay in Second Provincial from the early 1970s until the early 1990s.

A sustained revival began in the 1990s. Under head coach Jim Steensels, Bocholt secured promotion back to First Provincial in the 1992–93 season. Further progress followed with the appointment of former top-flight player Rony Vangompel as player-coach. In 1998, the club won the First Provincial championship, earning promotion to the Belgian Fourth Division and returning to national football after an absence of more than thirty years. Continued success culminated in promotion to the Belgian Third Division in 2001.

Bocholt established itself at third-tier level, remaining in the national divisions for fifteen consecutive seasons. During this period, the club frequently finished in the upper half of the table and qualified for the promotion play-offs on several occasions, coming close to promotion to the second tier in both 2012 and 2013.

Following the restructuring of the Belgian league system in 2016, Bocholt was placed in the fourth tier, the Belgian Division 2 (initially known as the Belgian Second Amateur Division). The club has since competed at national amateur level. Over the course of its history, Bocholt has also made several appearances in the Belgian Cup, facing opponents including Anderlecht, Club Brugge, Gent, and KV Mechelen.
