= Londerzeel =

- Municipality
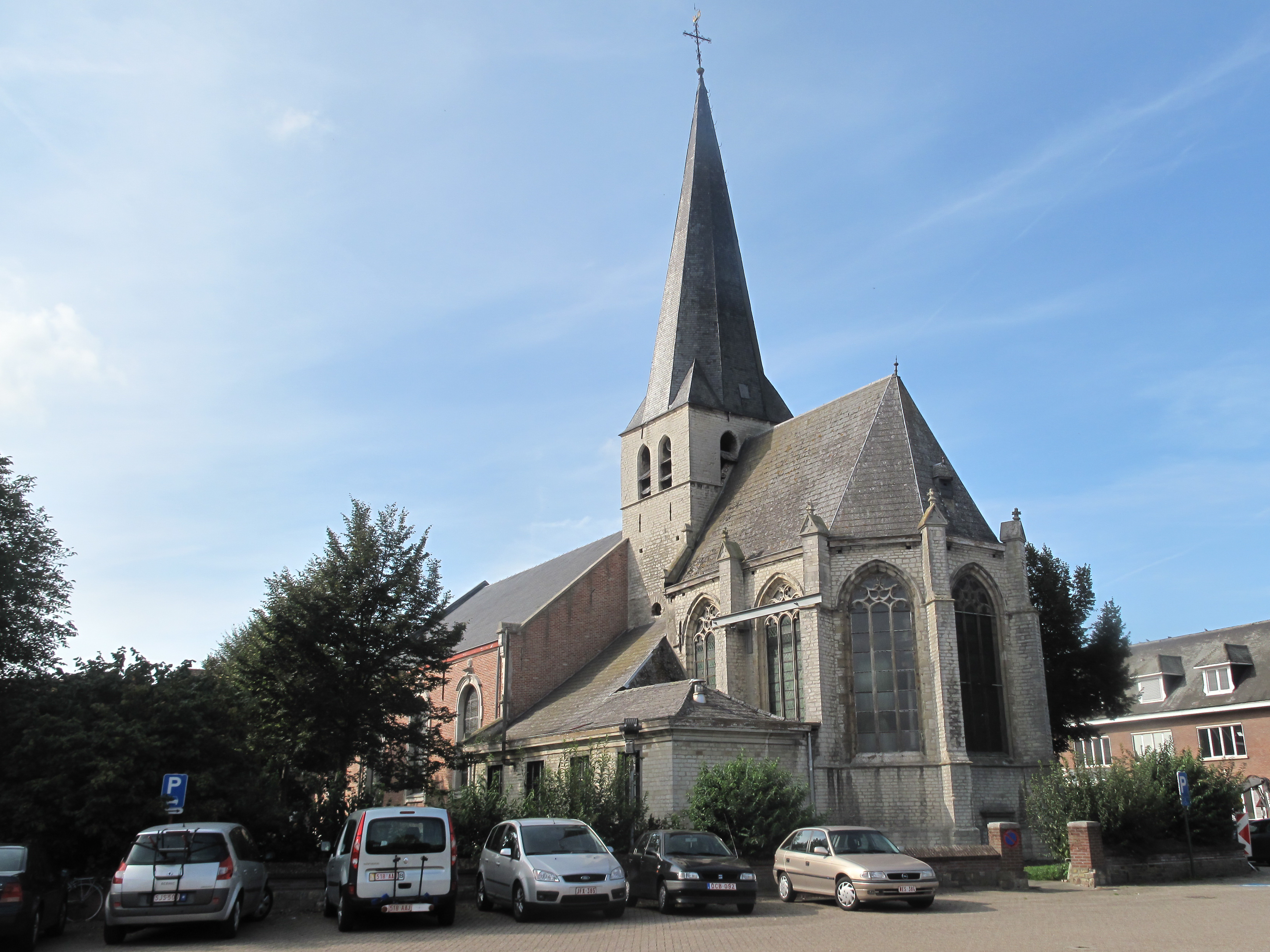
- Steenhuffel church

- Flag Coat of arms

- Location of Londerzeel in Flemish Brabant
- Interactive map of Londerzeel
- Location in Belgium
- Coordinates: 51°00′N 04°18′E
- Country: Belgium
- Community: Flemish Community
- Region: Flemish Region
- Province: Flemish Brabant
- Arrondissement: Halle-Vilvoorde

Government
  - Mayor: Conny Moons (LWD)
  - Governing parties: CD&V, LWD, Groen)

Area
  - Total: 36.53 km^{2} (14.10 sq mi)

Population (2018-01-01)
  - Total: 18,620
  - Density: 509.7/km^{2} (1,320/sq mi)
- Postal codes: 1840
- NIS code: 23045
- Area codes: 052, 015
- Website: www.londerzeel.be

Londerzeel (Dutch pronunciation: [ˈlɔndərzeːl]) is a municipality located in the Belgian province of Flemish Brabant. The municipality comprises the towns of Londerzeel proper, Malderen, Steenhuffel (home of Palm Breweries) and Sint-Jozef. On 1 January 2018, Londerzeel had a total population of 18,620. The total area is 36.53 km^{2} which gives a population density of 510 inhabitants per km^{2}.

Their football team is K. Londerzeel S.K.

== Notable people ==
- Gerard Walschap (b. Londerzeel-St. Jozef, 9 July 1898-Antwerp, 25 October 1989), writer.
- Kris Van Assche, fashion designer.

== Twin towns ==
Londerzeel has been twinned with Gladenbach (Germany) since 2010.
