= Easi Arena =

Multi-use stadium in La Louvière, Belgium

Coordinates: 50°28′39″N 4°12′05″E

- Interactive map of Easi Arena
- Location: La Louvière, Belgium
- Capacity: 8,050
- Surface: Artificial grass

Construction
- Opened: 2025

Tenant
- RAAL La Louvière

The Easi Arena is a multi-use stadium in La Louvière, Belgium. It is currently used mostly for football matches. The stadium is one of the most recent stadiums built in Belgium and was completed in 2025. It serves as the new ground of RAAL La Louvière and lies just a few tens of meters next to the former stadium, the Stade du Tivoli. The stadium holds 8,050 people and was built in 2025.
