= SK Londerzeel =

Belgian football club

Londerzeel
- Full name: Koninklijke Londerzeelse Sportkring
- Founded: 1929; 97 years ago
- Ground: Eeckelaers Stadion, Londerzeel
- Capacity: 3,000
- Chairman: Frank Verbesselt
- Manager: Tom Schipper
- League: Belgian Division 2
- 2025–26: Belgian Division 2 VV B, 2nd of 16

Koninklijke Londerzeelse Sportkring, often referred to as SK Londerzeel, is a Belgian association football club based in the community of Londerzeel. The first team competes in Belgian Division 2, the fourth tier of Belgian football.

== History ==
The club was founded in 1929 as Londerzeel Sportkring and played in the Flemish Football Association (Vlaamsche Voetbalbond), a concurrent of the Belgian Football Association. After the Second World War, the club joined the Belgian Football Association and was appointed the startnummer 3630.

In 1980 the club reached the Belgian Fourth Division, the lowest national division. The following season they were also joined by cross-town rivals Delta Londerzeel. Together with Delta, SK relegated in 1984. In the early 1990s they played in the Fourth Division again, but the club would eventually suffer relegation again in 1994. In 1999 they returned to the fourth tier, and were able to stay up, accomplishing a third place in the league table.

After two seasons in the middle bracket, the team managed to finish second in their division in 2004, and enforced a spot in the play-offs. In the second round, however, they lost to White Star Lauwe. The following season, Londerzeel again achieved a place in the play-offs. This time they lost to Sottegem in the first round. In 2006, Londerzeel were finally able to win promotion. The team finished top of the league after an exciting season in which they won the title on the last day of play after a 4–0 away victory against Dilbeek Sport, which ensured promotion to the Belgian Third Division for the first time. In 2008, after two years at this level, the team were relegated to the fourth division again.

In 2013, Londerzeel were promoted back to Third Division. After the reform of amateur football in Belgium, the club began playing in the Belgian Division 2 in 2019.

In 2024–25, Londerzeel secure promotion to Belgian Division 2 from next season after finishing first place of Belgian Division 2 VV B.
