= FC Gullegem =

Belgian football club

Gullegem
- Founded: 2008
- Ground: Poezelhoek
- Manager: Stefan Deloose
- League: Belgian Division 3
- 2025–26: Belgian Division 2 VV A, 16th of 16 (relegated)

FC Gullegem is a Belgian football club based in Gullegem, Wevelgem, West Flanders. It has the colors white and red.

== History ==
The football club was founded in July 2008 after Gullegem withdrew from the merger club KSK Wevelgem City. The club was founded six years after the disappearance of SK Gullegem, which in 2002 was merged into fusion club Wevelgem City. According to the regulations of the Football Association, a former club name after 10 years re-used by a club, so it was after these six years is not possible, the old familiar name to adopt.

The club went into the competition starts in 2008–09 season at the lowest level in West Flanders, Fourth Provincial, and soon became champion. In addition, the team won the quarter finals in the cup of West Flanders, where they were eliminated from Sassport Boezinge after taking penalty kicks.

The club was successful in subsequent years, and became in 2009–10 in Third Provincial champion immediately, and repeat in 2010–11 in Second Provincial. The club promoted as for the third time in a row and performed from 2011 in First Provincial.

== Results ==
Season	Division								League	Points	Remarks
	I	II	III	IV	P.I	P.II	P.III	P.IV			
2008–09								1	Vierde Provinciale D	76	
2009–10							1		Derde Provinciale C	67	
2010–11						1			Tweede Provinciale B	74	
2011–12					4				Eerste Provinciale	54	Lost from KSK Oostnieuwkerke in play-offs
2012–13									Eerste Provinciale		
