= RSC Habay-la-Neuve =

Association football club in Habay-la-Neuve, Belgium

Royal Sporting Club Habay-la-Neuve
- Full name: Royal Sporting Club Habay-la-Neuve
- Short name: Habay-la-Neuve
- Founded: 1941; 85 years ago
- Ground: Stade Emile Mathieu, Habay
- Manager: Sébastien Delattre
- League: Belgian National Division 1
- 2025–26: Division 1 ACFF, 5th of 12
- Website: rschabay.be

Royal Sporting Club Habay-la-Neuve is a Belgian football club based in the village of Habay-la-Neuve in the Province of Luxembourg. The club plays in the Belgian National Division 1, after promotion from the Belgian Division 2 in 2024–25.

== History ==
Sporting Club Habay-la-Neuve was founded on 1 June 1941. Affiliation with the KBVB followed on 5 September 1941, at which time the club was assigned registration number 3093. The club was awarded the royal title on its 50th anniversary in 1991. It was not until a year later, on 1 July 1992, that the club changed its name to Royal Sporting Club Habay-la-Neuve.

Throughout its existence, RSC Habay-la-Neuve always played in the provincial leagues. It was not until 2017 that the club was able to advance to the national leagues for the first time. In its first season, the club finished in a relegation spot. The following season however, it immediately became champions again in the First Provincial Division, after which it was promoted back to the Third Division.

After five consecutive seasons in the Third National Division, the club was promoted two years in a row to compete in the First National Division for the first time in the 2025/26 season.
