= Belgian Division 2 =

- Founded: 2016; 10 years ago
- Country: Belgium
- Confederation: UEFA
- Number of clubs: 50 (3 leagues : 16+16+18)
- Level on pyramid: 4
- Promotion to: Belgian Division 1
- Relegation to: Belgian Division 3
- Domestic cup: Belgian Cup
- Current champions: Roeselare (VFV A), Houtvenne (VFV B) and Crossing Schaerbeek (ACFF) (2024–25)
- Current: 2026–27 Belgian Division 2

The Belgian Division 2, commonly referred to as simply Tweede Afdeling (in Dutch) or Division 2 (in French) is the fourth-highest division in the Belgian football league system, one level below the Belgian National Division 1. It was created by the Royal Belgian Football Association in 2016, replacing the Belgian Third Division and named Belgian Second Amateur Division until the 2019–20 season before it was renamed due to the negative connotation of the word amateur. The division consists of three separate leagues with 16 teams each. Two of these leagues consist of teams playing with a license from the Voetbalfederatie Vlaanderen (VFV, the Dutch speaking wing of the RBFA) and one with teams with a license from the Association des Clubs Francophones de Football (ACFF, the French-speaking wing of the RBFA).

== History ==
The Belgian Second Amateur Division was created in 2016 as successor of the Belgian Third Division following an overhaul of the Belgian football league system which saw the number of professional clubs reduced to 24. As a result, from the third level and below only amateur clubs remain. The two remaining levels above the Belgian Provincial leagues were reformed into three amateur levels, namely the Belgian First Amateur Division, Belgian Second Amateur Division and Belgian Third Amateur Division. As a result, the Belgian Provincial leagues dropped to the sixth level of the league system. In 2020 the levels three to five were renamed to Belgian National Division 1, Belgian Division 2 and Belgian Division 3 respectively.

== Competition format ==
In each of the three separate leagues, the season is a regular round-robin tournament with 16 teams. The winners of each league are directly promoted to the Belgian National Division 1. Besides these three promoting teams, one additional promotion is possible: for this twelve other teams are in contention as four teams in each league qualify for the end of season playoffs. The eight teams from the VFV side are grouped together to compete in a VFV playoff for two spots in the playoff final, the four teams from ACFF side playoff for one spot. The two VFV winners and the ACFF winner are joined by the 13th placed team from the Belgian National Division 1 in the playoff final, with the winner of those four taking the final promotion spot (in case the team from the Belgian National Division 1 wins, this team remains at that level and no extra team from the Belgian Second Amateur Division is promoted besides the three league winners).

Regarding relegation, on ACFF side the bottom three teams are relegated to the Belgian Division 3, while on VFV side only the bottom two teams from each league are relegated. Additionally, based on the language group of the directly relegating teams from the Belgian National Division 1 each season, it is possible that there will be up to three extra relegations on each side. On ACFF side this just means that any additional required relegations will happen from bottom upwards, starting with the 13th finisher, then 12th finisher and so on. On VFV side, a relegation playoff is organised each season between the two teams finishing 14th, with the losing team first in line to drop in case needed, followed by the winner. If an additional relegation would be necessary, the 13th placed teams would need to playoff as well.

== Past winners ==
Season	VV A winner	VV B winner	FFA winner	Promotion play-off winner
2016–17	Knokke	Berchem Sport	Châtelet	Aalst
2017–18	Rupel Boom	Tessenderlo	RWDM47	RFC Liège
2018–19	Sint-Eloois-Winkel	Patro Eisden Maasmechelen	La Louvière Centre	Visé
2019–20	Knokke	Tienen	Francs Borains	not held due to coronavirus pandemic
2020–21	season cancelled due to the coronavirus pandemic			
2021–22	Petegem (Note: Petegem decided not to apply for a license to play in the Belgian National Division 1, hence they were not eligible for promotion, causing runners-up Ninove to be promoted instead.)	Hoogstraten	RAAL La Louvière	Mandel United (Note: Mandel United was the participant from the Belgian National Division 1. By winning the play-off, the club remained at this level and no extra team from the Belgian Division 2 was promoted.)
2022–23	Lokeren-Temse	Cappellen	Warnant (Note: Warnant decided not to apply for a license to play in the Belgian National Division 1, hence they were not eligible for promotion and the highest finisher with an obtained licence runner-up Union Namur will be promoted instead.)	Young Reds Antwerp (Note: Young Reds Antwerp was the participant from the Belgian National Division 1. By winning the play-off, the club remained at this level and no extra team from the Belgian Division 2 was promoted.)
2023–24	Eendracht Aalst (Note: Eendracht Aalst was denied a license to play in the Belgian National Division 1, hence they were not eligible for promotion, causing runners-up Ninove to be promoted instead.)	Belisia Bilzen	Mons	Binche, Jong Cercle, Hasselt, Lyra-Lierse, Merelbeke, Rochefort, Tournai and Tubize-Braine (Note: Due to the reform of the Belgian National Division 1 from one single division into a separate VfV and ACFF division, the number of teams being promoted was uncertain beforehand. On VfV side, Jong Cercle, Hasselt, Lyra-Lierse and Merelbeke won their first match of the play-offs and were already certain of promotion after that. On ACFF side, a full play-off of four teams was played, but in the end all teams were promoted, and even more so also Stockay and Union SG B were also promoted as additional places opened up.)
2024–25	Roeselare	Houtvenne	Crossing Schaerbeek	Diegem, Habay-la-Neuve, Meux
2025–26	Mandel United	Heist	Onhaye	Harelbeke, Flénu
2026–27				
