= 2026–27 in Belgian football =

Football in Belgium
- Season: 2026–27

Men's football
- Super Cup: Union SG

The following article is a summary of the 2026–27 football season in Belgium, which is the 124th season of competitive football in the country and runs from July 2026 until June 2027.

== National teams ==
=== Belgium national football team ===
==== Results and fixtures ====
===== 2026–27 UEFA Nations League =====
====== League A ======
Pos	Team	Pld	W	D	L	GF	GA	GD	Pts	Qualification or relegation	(France)	(Belgium)	(Italy)	(Turkey)
1	France	6	4	1	1	10	6	+4	13	Advance to quarter-finals	—	4–1	1–1	2–1
2	Belgium	6	4	0	2	12	7	+5	12	Advance to quarter-finals	0–1	—	4–1	3–0
3	Italy	6	3	1	2	12	10	+2	10		3–1	0–2	—	3–1
4	Turkey (R)	6	0	0	6	4	15	−11	0	Relegated to League B	0–1	1–2	1–4	—

Source: UEFA
(R) Relegated

25 September 2026 2026–27 UEFA Nations League	Italy	0–2	Belgium	Rome, Italy
20:45		Report	Godts 20'; Lukébakio 69'	Stadium: Stadio Olimpico; Attendance: 47,155; Referee: Daniel Siebert (Germany)

28 September 2026 2026–27 UEFA Nations League	Belgium	0–1	France	Brussels, Belgium
20:45		Report	Olise 88'	Stadium: King Baudouin Stadium; Attendance: 40,857; Referee: Rade Obrenović (Slovenia)

2 October 2026 2026–27 UEFA Nations League	Belgium	3–0	Turkey	Stade Maurice Dufrasne, Liège
20:45	De Bruyne 10', 60'; Lukaku 76'	Report		Attendance: 24,386; Referee: Rohit Saggi (Norway)

5 October 2026 2026–27 UEFA Nations League	France	4–1	Belgium	Stade de France, Saint-Denis
20:45	Doué 77'; Cherki 81'; Olise 88', 90+1'	Report	Lukébakio 35'	Attendance: 75,389; Referee: Nick Walsh (Scotland)

12 November 2026 2026–27 UEFA Nations League	Turkey	1–2	Belgium	İzmir, Turkey
18:00	Güler 20'	Report	De Bruyne 27'; De Ketelaere 30'	Stadium: Gürsel Aksel Stadium; Attendance: 19,697; Referee: Sandro Schärer (Switzerland)

15 November 2026 2026–27 UEFA Nations League	Belgium	4–1	Italy	Brussels, Belgium
20:45	De Cuyper 15'; Ngoy 22'; Doku 26'; Moreira 80'	Report	P. Esposito 11'	Stadium: King Baudouin Stadium; Attendance: 41,842; Referee: Espen Eskås (Norway)

====== Knockout stage ======
25–27 March 2027 2026–27 UEFA Nations League	Belgium	v	Group winner

28–30 March 2027 2026–27 UEFA Nations League	Group winner	v	Belgium

=== Belgium women's national football team ===
==== Results and fixtures ====
===== Friendlies =====
1 December 2026 Friendly	Belgium	v	South Korea	Girona, Spain
16:00

===== 2027 FIFA Women's World Cup qualification =====
====== 2027 FIFA Women's World Cup qualification – UEFA play-offs ======
9 October 2026 2027 FIFA Women's World Cup qualification	Belgium	1–0	Poland	Leuven
20:15	Dhont 45+1'	Report (FIFA); Report (UEFA)		Stadium: Den Dreef; Attendance: 6,238; Referee: Emanuela Rusta (Albania)

13 October 2026 2027 FIFA Women's World Cup qualification	Poland	3–2 (a.e.t.) (4–3 p)	Belgium	Gdańsk
18:00	Pajor 42', 116'; Tomasiak 67'	Report (FIFA); Report (UEFA)	Littel 51'; Teulings 105'	Stadium: Gdańsk Stadium; Referee: Ivana Martinčić (Croatia)
	Penalties
	Dudek (penalty scored); Pajor (penalty missed); Kamczyk (penalty scored); Achcińska (penalty scored); Padila (penalty scored)		(penalty scored) Wullaert; (penalty missed) Teulings; (penalty missed) Vanzeir; (penalty scored) Littel; (penalty scored) Cayman

=== Belgium national under-21 football team ===
==== Results and fixtures ====
===== Friendlies =====
13 November 2026 Friendly	Germany	1–2	Belgium	Stadion an der Hafenstraße, Essen
18:00	Damar 25'	Report	Duranville 8'; Vermant 65'	Attendance: 10,107; Referee: Gergő Bogár (Hungary)

16 November 2026 Friendly	Italy	2–2	Belgium	Stadio Armando Picchi, Livorno
18:15	Cherubini 25'; Ekhator 88' (pen.)	Report	Mirisola 27', 52'

===== 2027 UEFA European Under-21 Championship qualification =====
====== Group I ======
Pos	Team	Pld	W	D	L	GF	GA	GD	Pts	Qualification	Belgium	Denmark	Austria	Wales	Belarus
1	Belgium	8	5	2	1	13	2	+11	17	Final tournament	—	2–0	1–0	1–0	1–0
2	Denmark	8	4	3	1	15	6	+9	15	Play-offs	0–0	—	1–1	4–0	2–0
3	Austria	8	4	2	2	15	9	+6	14		1–0	1–1	—	0–2	2–1
4	Wales	8	2	0	6	7	28	−21	6		0–7	2–6	1–7	—	2–0
5	Belarus	8	1	1	6	7	12	−5	4		1–1	0–1	2–3	3–0	—

Source: UEFA

24 September 2026 2027 UEFA European Under-21 Championship qualification	Belgium	1–0	Belarus	Het Kuipje, Westerlo
20:00	Bassette 70' (pen.)	Report		Attendance: 1,686; Referee: Martin Velikov (Bulgaria)

29 September 2026 2027 UEFA European Under-21 Championship qualification	Belgium	1–0	Wales	Het Kuipje, Westerlo
20:00	Bassette 7'	Report		Attendance: 2,363; Referee: Jan Všetečka (Czech Republic)

6 October 2026 2027 UEFA European Under-21 Championship qualification	Denmark	0–0	Belgium	Vejle Stadium, Vejle
18:30		Report		Attendance: 3,600; Referee: Igor Bosca (Moldova)

=== Belgium national under-19 football team ===
==== Results and fixtures ====
===== 2027 UEFA European Under-19 Championship qualification =====
====== Round 2: Group A2 ======
Pos	Team	Pld	W	D	L	GF	GA	GD	Pts	Transfer or relegation
1	Belgium	3	3	0	0	8	1	+7	9	Transferred to Round 3 League A
2	Scotland (H)	3	2	0	1	5	5	0	6	Transferred to Round 3 League A
3	Kazakhstan	3	1	0	2	2	5	−3	3	Transferred to Round 3 League A
4	Kosovo	3	0	0	3	0	4	−4	0	Relegated to Round 3 League B

Source: UEFA
Rules for classification: Qualification tiebreakers
(H) Hosts

11 November 2026 2027 UEFA European Under-19 Championship qualification	Belgium	2–0	Kosovo	Excelsior Stadium, Airdrie
12:15	Amengai 47'; Da Silva 49'	Report		Referee: Robin Hensgens (Netherlands)

14 November 2026 2027 UEFA European Under-19 Championship qualification	Belgium	2−0	Kazakhstan	Broadwood Stadium, Cumbernauld
16:00	De Wannemacker 58', 75' (pen.)	Report		Referee: Christos Vergetis (Greece)

17 November 2026 2027 UEFA European Under-19 Championship qualification	Scotland	1−4	Belgium	Broadwood Stadium, Cumbernauld
16:00	Clearie 23' (pen.)	Report	Elbay 7'; De Brul 45'; Van De Ven 51'; Bisiwu 64'	Referee: Robin Hensgens (Netherlands)

====== Round 3 ======
Draw scheduled for 10 December 2026.

=== Belgium women's national under-19 football team ===
==== Results and fixtures ====
===== 2027 UEFA Women's Under-19 Championship qualification =====
====== Group A7 ======
Pos	Team	Pld	W	D	L	GF	GA	GD	Pts	Transfer or relegation
1	Iceland	0	0	0	0	0	0	0	0	Transfer to Round 2 League A
2	France	0	0	0	0	0	0	0	0	Transfer to Round 2 League A
3	Belgium	0	0	0	0	0	0	0	0	Transfer to Round 2 League A
4	Croatia (H)	0	0	0	0	0	0	0	0	Relegation to Round 2 League B

First match(es) will be played: 28 November 2026. Source: UEFA
Rules for classification: Tiebreakers
(H) Hosts

28 November 2026 2027 UEFA Women's Under-19 Championship qualification	Belgium	v	France	Sport Centre Rudes, Zagreb
		Report

1 December 2026 2027 UEFA Women's Under-19 Championship qualification	Iceland	v	Belgium	Sport Centre Rudes, Zagreb
		Report

4 December 2026 2027 UEFA Women's Under-19 Championship qualification	Croatia	v	Belgium	Stadion Branko Čavlović-Čavlek, Karlovac
		Report

=== Belgium national under-17 football team ===
==== Results and fixtures ====
===== 2027 UEFA European Under-17 Championship qualification =====
====== Group 12 ======
Pos	Team	Pld	W	D	L	GF	GA	GD	Pts	Qualification
1	Belgium	3	3	0	0	13	2	+11	9	Round 2 League A
2	Croatia (H)	3	1	1	1	6	3	+3	4	Round 2 League A
3	Kosovo	3	1	0	2	4	13	−9	3	Round 2 League B
4	Latvia	3	0	1	2	4	9	−5	1	Round 2 League B

Source: UEFA
Rules for classification: Tiebreakers
(H) Hosts

11 November 2026 2027 UEFA European Under-17 Championship qualification	Belgium	8–1	Kosovo	Ivan Laljak-Ivić Stadium, Zaprešić
12:30	Ossohou 3'; Mujangi 20' (pen.), 67'; Mbambi 26', 57'; Oppenbrouwer 34'; Eriyo 59', 72'	Report	Thaqi 56'	Referee: Anton Lashuk (Belarus)

14 November 2026 2027 UEFA European Under-17 Championship qualification	Belgium	4–1	Latvia	Ivan Laljak-Ivić Stadium, Zaprešić
12:30	Billiet 23'; Fossi 27'; Ossohou 52'; Mbambi 67'	Report	Aizsilnieks 45+2' (pen.)	Referee: Anton Lashuk (Belarus)

17 November 2026 2027 UEFA European Under-17 Championship qualification	Croatia	0–1	Belgium	Stadion Branko Čavlović-Čavlek, Karlovac
11:00		Report	Mujangi 84'	Referee: Vasil Minev (Bulgaria)

===== 2026 FIFA U-17 World Cup =====
====== Group G ======
Pos	Team	Pld	W	D	L	GF	GA	GD	Pts	Qualification
1	Mali	1	1	0	0	3	0	+3	3	Knockout stage
2	Belgium	1	1	0	0	3	2	+1	3	Knockout stage
3	Vietnam	1	0	0	1	2	3	−1	0	Possible knockout stage
4	New Zealand	1	0	0	1	0	3	−3	0	

Updated to match(es) played on 20 November 2026. Source: FIFA
Rules for classification: Group stage tiebreakers

20 November 2026	Belgium	3–2	Vietnam	Aspire Zone (Pitch 9), Al Rayyan
16:00	Moorthamer 39'; Achahbar 42'; Philips 60'	Report	Lê Sỹ Bách 4'; Chu Ngọc Nguyễn Lực 84'	Referee: Daiane Muniz (Brazil)

23 November 2026	Mali	v	Belgium	Aspire Zone (Pitch 7), Al Rayyan
18:30		Report

26 November 2026	New Zealand	v	Belgium	Aspire Zone (Pitch 4), Al Rayyan
16:00		Report

=== Belgium women's national under-17 football team ===
==== Results and fixtures ====
===== 2027 UEFA Women's Under-17 Championship qualification =====
====== Group A4 ======
Pos	Team	Pld	W	D	L	GF	GA	GD	Pts	Transfer or relegation
1	Spain	3	3	0	0	10	0	+10	9	Transfer to Round 2 League A
2	Belgium (H)	3	2	0	1	9	5	+4	6	Transfer to Round 2 League A
3	Portugal	3	1	0	2	1	7	−6	3	Transfer to Round 2 League A
4	Switzerland	3	0	0	3	2	10	−8	0	Relegation to Round 2 League B

Source: UEFA
Rules for classification: Tiebreakers
(H) Hosts

13 November 2026 2027 UEFA Women's Under-17 Championship qualification	Spain	3–0	Belgium	Edmond Machtens Stadium, Brussels
12:00	Vizuete 16'; Quintana 45'; Rius 55'	Report		Referee: Araksya Saribekyan (Armenia)

16 November 2026 2027 UEFA Women's Under-17 Championship qualification	Portugal	0–3	Belgium	National Training Centre, Tubize
19:00		Report	Loose 36'; Corneillie 53'; Dehaemers 56'

19 November 2026 2027 UEFA Women's Under-17 Championship qualification	Belgium	6–2	Switzerland	National Training Centre, Tubize
15:00	Brasser 31' (o.g.); Lison 40'; Dehaemers 45+3'; Loose 53', 55'; De Wolf 61'	Report	Winter 29', 38' (pen.)	Referee: Araksya Saribekyan (Armenia)

== UEFA competitions ==
=== UEFA Champions League ===
Belgian clubs participating in the 2026–27 UEFA Champions League:

- Club Brugge (entered league phase)
- Union Saint-Gilloise (entered third qualifying round, dropped down to UEFA Europa League)

==== Qualifying phase and play-off round ====
Royale Union Saint-Gilloise entered the Champions League in the third qualifying round.

===== Third qualifying round =====
Team 1	Agg.	Team 2	1st leg	2nd leg
Union Saint-Gilloise (Belgium)	5–6	(Norway) Bodø/Glimt	3–3	2–3 (a.e.t.)

==== League phase ====
Club Brugge KV entered the Champions League in the league phase.

===== Club Brugge =====
Pos	Team	Pld	W	D	L	GF	GA	GD	Pts	Qualification
7	(England) Manchester City	4	3	0	1	12	7	+5	9	Advance to round of 16 (seeded)
8	(England) Liverpool	4	3	0	1	14	10	+4	9	Advance to round of 16 (seeded)
9	(Belgium) Club Brugge	4	3	0	1	11	7	+4	9	Advance to knockout phase play-offs (seeded)
10	(Portugal) Sporting CP	4	3	0	1	8	4	+4	9	Advance to knockout phase play-offs (seeded)
11	(Spain) Real Betis	4	3	0	1	8	6	+2	9	Advance to knockout phase play-offs (seeded)

Updated to match(es) played on 4 November 2026. Source: UEFA
Rules for classification: League phase tiebreakers

Home team	Score	Away team
Club Brugge (Belgium)	2–3	(England) Aston Villa
Inter Milan (Italy)	3–4	(Belgium) Club Brugge
Club Brugge (Belgium)	3–0	(France) Lens
PSV Eindhoven (Netherlands)	1–2	(Belgium) Club Brugge
Club Brugge (Belgium)	25 Nov	(England) Liverpool
Napoli (Italy)	8 Dec	(Belgium) Club Brugge
Stuttgart (Germany)	19 Jan	(Belgium) Club Brugge
Club Brugge (Belgium)	27 Jan	(Norway) Bodø/Glimt

=== UEFA Europa League ===
Belgian clubs participating in the 2026–27 UEFA Europa League:

- Union Saint-Gilloise (entered league phase, after dropping down from UEFA Champions League qualifying)
- Sint-Truiden (entered play-off round)
- Anderlecht (entered second qualifying round)

==== Second qualifying round ====
Team 1	Agg.	Team 2	1st leg	2nd leg
Hammarby IF (Sweden)	2–4	(Belgium) Anderlecht	1–1	1–3

==== Third qualifying round ====
Team 1	Agg.	Team 2	1st leg	2nd leg
PAOK (Greece)	2–4	(Belgium) Anderlecht	0–1	2–3

==== Play-off round ====
Team 1	Agg.	Team 2	1st leg	2nd leg
Kairat (Kazakhstan)	0–6	(Belgium) Anderlecht	0–3	0–3
Sint-Truiden (Belgium)	3–4	(Cyprus) Omonia	1–0	2–4

==== League phase ====
===== Anderlecht =====
Pos	Team	Pld	W	D	L	GF	GA	GD	Pts	Qualification
13	(France) Lyon	4	2	1	1	6	7	−1	7	Advance to knockout phase play-offs (seeded)
14	(Netherlands) AZ	4	2	0	2	7	4	+3	6	Advance to knockout phase play-offs (seeded)
15	(Belgium) Anderlecht	4	2	0	2	6	3	+3	6	Advance to knockout phase play-offs (seeded)
16	(Greece) OFI	4	2	0	2	5	4	+1	6	Advance to knockout phase play-offs (seeded)
17	(France) Rennes	4	1	3	0	4	3	+1	6	Advance to knockout phase play-offs (unseeded)

Updated to match(es) played on 5 November 2026. Source: UEFA
Rules for classification: League phase tiebreakers

Home team	Score	Away team
Anderlecht (Belgium)	1–2	(France) Lyon
Dinamo Zagreb (Croatia)	1–0	(Belgium) Anderlecht
Jagiellonia Białystok (Poland)	0–3	(Belgium) Anderlecht
Anderlecht (Belgium)	2–0	(Austria) Red Bull Salzburg
OFI (Greece)	26 Nov	(Belgium) Anderlecht
Anderlecht (Belgium)	10 Dec	(Germany) Hoffenheim
Anderlecht (Belgium)	21 Jan	(England) Sunderland
Marseille (France)	28 Jan	(Belgium) Anderlecht

===== Union SG =====
Pos	Team	Pld	W	D	L	GF	GA	GD	Pts	Qualification
2	(England) Bournemouth	4	4	0	0	11	2	+9	12	Advance to round of 16 (seeded)
3	(Hungary) Ferencváros	4	4	0	0	11	3	+8	12	Advance to round of 16 (seeded)
4	(Belgium) Union Saint-Gilloise	4	3	1	0	10	2	+8	10	Advance to round of 16 (seeded)
5	(Italy) Juventus	4	3	1	0	11	4	+7	10	Advance to round of 16 (seeded)
6	(Greece) Olympiacos	4	3	1	0	4	1	+3	10	Advance to round of 16 (seeded)

Updated to match(es) played on 5 November 2026. Source: UEFA
Rules for classification: League phase tiebreakers

Home team	Score	Away team
Viktoria Plzeň (Czech Republic)	0–3	(Belgium) Union Saint-Gilloise
Union Saint-Gilloise (Belgium)	1–1	(Spain) Real Sociedad
Union Saint-Gilloise (Belgium)	4–0	(Israel) Hapoel Be'er Sheva
Celta Vigo (Spain)	1–2	(Belgium) Union Saint-Gilloise
Union Saint-Gilloise (Belgium)	26 Nov	(Poland) Lech Poznań
Lyon (France)	10 Dec	(Belgium) Union Saint-Gilloise
Beşiktaş (Turkey)	21 Jan	(Belgium) Union Saint-Gilloise
Union Saint-Gilloise (Belgium)	28 Jan	(Scotland) Celtic

=== UEFA Conference League ===
Belgian clubs participating in the 2026–27 UEFA Conference League:

- Sint-Truiden (entered league phase, after dropping down from UEFA Europa League qualifying)
- Gent (entered second qualifying round)

==== Second qualifying round ====
Team 1	Agg.	Team 2	1st leg	2nd leg
LNZ Cherkasy (Ukraine)	0–0 (2–4 p)	(Belgium) Gent	0–0	0–0 (a.e.t.)

==== Third qualifying round ====
Team 1	Agg.	Team 2	1st leg	2nd leg
IFK Göteborg (Sweden)	1–2	(Belgium) Gent	0–1	1–1

==== Play-off round ====
Team 1	Agg.	Team 2	1st leg	2nd leg
Gent (Belgium)	3–2	(Scotland) Hibernian	0–0	3–2

==== League phase ====
===== Gent =====
Pos	Team	Pld	W	D	L	GF	GA	GD	Pts	Qualification
16	(Italy) Atalanta	3	1	1	1	4	4	0	4	Advance to knockout phase play-offs (seeded)
17	(Portugal) Braga	3	1	1	1	2	3	−1	4	Advance to knockout phase play-offs (unseeded)
18	(Belgium) Gent	3	1	1	1	1	2	−1	4	Advance to knockout phase play-offs (unseeded)
19	(Latvia) Riga	3	0	3	0	3	3	0	3	Advance to knockout phase play-offs (unseeded)
20	(Switzerland) Thun	3	1	0	2	3	3	0	3	Advance to knockout phase play-offs (unseeded)

Updated to match(es) played on 5 November 2026. Source: UEFA
Rules for classification: League phase tiebreakers

Home team	Score	Away team
Gent (Belgium)	1–0	(Denmark) AGF
Braga (Portugal)	2–0	(Belgium) Gent
KuPS (Finland)	0–0	(Belgium) Gent
Gent (Belgium)	26 Nov	(Serbia) Red Star Belgrade
Thun (Switzerland)	10 Dec	(Belgium) Gent
Gent (Belgium)	17 Dec	(Norway) Brann

===== Sint-Truiden =====
Pos	Team	Pld	W	D	L	GF	GA	GD	Pts	Qualification
8	(Romania) Universitatea Craiova	3	2	1	0	6	2	+4	7	Advance to round of 16 (seeded)
9	(Sweden) Mjällby AIF	3	2	1	0	5	1	+4	7	Advance to knockout phase play-offs (seeded)
10	(Belgium) Sint-Truiden	3	2	1	0	4	1	+3	7	Advance to knockout phase play-offs (seeded)
11	(Netherlands) Ajax	3	2	0	1	9	3	+6	6	Advance to knockout phase play-offs (seeded)
12	(Turkey) Trabzonspor	3	2	0	1	6	3	+3	6	Advance to knockout phase play-offs (seeded)

Updated to match(es) played on 5 November 2026. Source: UEFA
Rules for classification: League phase tiebreakers

Home team	Score	Away team
Sint-Truiden (Belgium)	2–0	(Georgia (country)) Iberia 1999
Midtjylland (Denmark)	0–1	(Belgium) Sint-Truiden
Sint-Truiden (Belgium)	1–1	(Norway) Brann
Hajduk Split (Croatia)	26 Nov	(Belgium) Sint-Truiden
Sint-Truiden (Belgium)	10 Dec	(Netherlands) Ajax
Lugano (Switzerland)	17 Dec	(Belgium) Sint-Truiden

=== UEFA Women's Champions League ===
Belgian clubs participating in the 2026–27 UEFA Women's Champions League:

- OH Leuven (entered second qualifying round)

==== Qualifying rounds ====
===== Second qualifying round =====
====== Semi-finals ======
Semi-finals
Team 1	Score	Team 2
OH Leuven (Belgium)	4–0	(Serbia) ŽFK TSC Bačka Topola

====== Final ======
Final
Team 1	Score	Team 2
OH Leuven (Belgium)	1–1 (a.e.t.) (4–2 p)	(Turkey) Fenerbahçe

===== Third qualifying round =====
Team 1	Agg.	Team 2	1st leg	2nd leg
Czarni Sosnowiec (Poland)	2–6	(Belgium) OH Leuven	1–4	1–2

==== League stage ====
===== OH Leuven =====
Pos	Team	Pld	W	D	L	GF	GA	GD	Pts
14	(Italian Football Federation) Inter Milan	5	1	1	3	4	14	−10	4
15	(Swiss Football Association) Servette Chênois	5	1	0	4	7	22	−15	3
16	(Swedish Football Association) BK Häcken	5	0	2	3	1	7	−6	2
17	(Royal Belgian Football Association) OH Leuven	5	0	2	3	2	13	−11	2
18	(Austrian Football Association) Austria Wien (E)	5	0	1	4	3	13	−10	1

Updated to match(es) played on 19 November 2026. Source: UEFA
Rules for classification: League phase tiebreakers
(E) Eliminated

Home team	Score	Away team
OH Leuven (Belgium)	0–0	(Italy) Roma
Paris Saint-Germain (France)	5–0	(Belgium) OH Leuven
Servette Chênois (Switzerland)	5–1	(Belgium) OH Leuven
OH Leuven (Belgium)	1–1	(Denmark) HB Køge
Juventus (Italy)	2–0	(Belgium) OH Leuven
OH Leuven (Belgium)	16 Dec	(England) Chelsea

=== UEFA Women's Europa Cup ===
Belgian clubs participating in the 2026–27 UEFA Women's Europa Cup:

- Anderlecht (entered first qualifying round)

==== Qualifying rounds ====
===== First qualifying round =====
Team 1	Agg.	Team 2	1st leg	2nd leg
Anderlecht (Belgium)	3–4	(Netherlands) Feyenoord	2–1	1–3

=== UEFA Youth League ===
==== UEFA Champions League Path ====
===== Club Brugge =====
Pos	Team	Pld	W	D	L	GF	GA	GD	Pts	Qualification
11	(Italy) Roma	4	2	1	1	10	4	+6	7	Advance to knockout phase
12	(France) Paris Saint-Germain	4	2	1	1	9	5	+4	7	Advance to knockout phase
13	(Belgium) Club Brugge	4	2	1	1	12	9	+3	7	Advance to knockout phase
14	(Portugal) Sporting CP	4	2	1	1	9	7	+2	7	Advance to knockout phase
15	(France) Lille	4	2	1	1	7	5	+2	7	Advance to knockout phase

Updated to match(es) played on 4 November 2026. Source: UEFA
Rules for classification: League phase tiebreakers

Home team	Score	Away team
Club Brugge (Belgium)	5–3	(England) Aston Villa
Inter Milan (Italy)	1–1	(Belgium) Club Brugge
Club Brugge (Belgium)	4–2	(France) Lens
PSV Eindhoven (Netherlands)	3–2	(Belgium) Club Brugge
Club Brugge (Belgium)	25 Nov	(England) Liverpool
Napoli (Italy)	8 Dec	(Belgium) Club Brugge

==== Domestic Champions Path ====
===== Second round =====
Second round
Team 1	Agg.	Team 2	1st leg	2nd leg
Genk (Belgium)	4–5	(Austria) Red Bull Salzburg	1–1	3–4

== League competitions (Men's) ==
=== Pro League ===
Pos	Team	Pld	W	D	L	GF	GA	GD	Pts	Qualification or relegation
1	Union SG	11	9	2	0	30	7	+23	29	Qualification for the Champions League league phase
2	Club Brugge	11	9	1	1	27	9	+18	28	Qualification for the Champions League third qualifying round
3	Gent	11	9	1	1	20	6	+14	28	Qualification for the Europa League second qualifying round
4	Charleroi	11	9	0	2	26	13	+13	27	Qualification for the Conference League second qualifying round
5	Anderlecht	11	6	2	3	14	12	+2	20	
6	Lommel	11	4	4	3	15	13	+2	16	
7	Genk	11	4	3	4	18	15	+3	15	
8	Standard Liège	11	4	3	4	18	16	+2	15	
9	Westerlo	12	4	2	6	26	31	−5	14	
10	OH Leuven	11	3	3	5	12	17	−5	12	
11	Cercle Brugge	12	3	3	6	15	22	−7	12	
12	Mechelen	11	3	3	5	13	20	−7	12	
13	Sint-Truiden	11	3	2	6	22	22	0	11	
14	Antwerp	11	3	2	6	18	24	−6	11	
15	Zulte Waregem	11	3	2	6	13	20	−7	11	
16	Beveren	11	3	1	7	13	23	−10	10	
17	La Louvière	11	2	1	8	13	24	−11	7	Relegation to Challenger Pro League
18	Kortrijk	11	1	1	9	4	23	−19	4	Relegation to Challenger Pro League

Updated to match(es) played on 20 November 2026. Source: Jupiler Pro League (in Dutch)
Rules for classification: 1) Points; 2) Matches won; 3) Goal difference; 4) Goals scored; 5) Away matches won; 6) Away goal difference; 7) Away goals scored; 8) Play-off.

=== Challenger Pro League ===
==== Regular season ====
Pos	Team	Pld	W	D	L	GF	GA	GD	Pts	Qualification
1	Beerschot	10	9	0	1	25	8	+17	27	Promoted to Pro League
2	Dender EH	10	6	2	2	14	6	+8	20	Qualification for promotion play-offs
3	Eupen	9	6	0	3	18	11	+7	18	Qualification for promotion play-offs
4	Francs Borains	9	6	0	3	11	10	+1	18	Qualification for promotion play-offs
5	Patro Eisden Maasmechelen	10	5	0	5	16	16	0	15	Qualification for promotion play-offs
6	Hasselt	9	5	0	4	13	15	−2	15	
7	Virton	10	4	2	4	17	14	+3	14	
8	Lokeren	10	4	2	4	18	17	+1	14	
9	Jong KAA Gent^{U23} (Note: Ineligible for promotion or promotion play-offs)	9	3	3	3	12	14	−2	12	
10	Lierse	10	3	2	5	10	14	−4	11	
11	Jong Genk^{U23}	10	2	4	4	14	17	−3	10	
12	Club NXT^{U23}	10	2	4	4	16	23	−7	10	
13	Seraing	10	2	2	6	12	17	−5	8	
14	RSCA Futures^{U23}	9	2	1	6	12	17	−5	7	Relegated to National Division 1
15	RFC Liège	9	1	2	6	13	22	−9	5	Relegated to National Division 1

Updated to match(es) played on 20 November 2026. Source: Challenger Pro League
Rules for classification: 1) Points; 2) Matches won; 3) Goal difference; 4) Goals scored; 5) Away matches won; 6) Away goal difference; 7) Away goals made.

=== Amateur Leagues ===
==== Belgian Division 1 ====
===== VV =====
Pos	Team	Pld	W	D	L	GF	GA	GD	Pts	Qualification or relegation
1	Mandel United	12	8	1	3	23	12	11	25	Promotion to the Challenger Pro League
2	Roeselare	12	7	4	1	21	5	16	25	
3	Houtvenne	12	7	2	3	23	16	7	23	
4	Thes	12	6	4	2	20	13	7	22	
5	OH Leuven U-23^{U23}	12	6	4	2	25	19	6	22	
6	Belisia	12	6	2	4	23	19	4	20	
7	Merelbeke	12	5	3	4	16	14	2	18	
8	Dessel	12	5	3	4	24	24	0	18	
9	Heist	12	5	2	5	24	17	7	17	
10	Hoogstraten	12	4	4	4	26	21	5	16	
11	Knokke	12	4	1	7	14	20	−6	13	
12	Tienen	12	3	3	6	19	21	−2	12	
13	Jong Cercle^{U23}	12	2	4	6	17	28	−11	10	
14	Lyra-Lierse	12	2	3	7	18	27	−9	9	
15	Zelzate	12	2	3	7	15	28	−13	9	Relegation to Division 2
16	Harelbeke	12	2	1	9	9	33	−24	7	Relegation to Division 2

Updated to match(es) played on 15 November 2026. Source: Voetbal Vlaanderen : Competitie 1e Afdeling Voetb Vl (in Dutch)
Rules for classification: 1) Points; 2) Matches won; 3) Goal difference; 4) Goals scored; 5) Away goals scored; 6) Away matches won.

===== FFA =====
====== Regular season ======
Pos	Team	Pld	W	D	L	GF	GA	GD	Pts	Qualification or relegation
1	Meux	13	8	1	4	20	14	6	25	Qualification for Promotion play-offs
2	Union SG B^{U23}	13	7	3	3	25	15	10	24	Qualification for Promotion play-offs
3	Tubize-Braine	13	7	3	3	21	15	6	24	Qualification for Promotion play-offs
4	Mons	13	7	2	4	30	20	10	23	Qualification for Promotion play-offs
5	Rochefort	13	6	4	3	25	14	11	22	Qualification for Promotion play-offs
6	RWDM Brussels	13	6	3	4	17	15	2	21	Qualification for Promotion play-offs
7	Olympic Charleroi	13	5	4	4	18	23	−5	19	Qualification for Relegation play-offs
8	Zébra Élites^{U23}	13	3	6	4	13	14	−1	15	Qualification for Relegation play-offs
9	SL16 FC^{U23}	13	4	2	7	14	15	−1	14	Qualification for Relegation play-offs
10	Onhaye	13	4	2	7	13	22	−9	14	Qualification for Relegation play-offs
11	Habay-la-Neuve	13	3	4	6	11	16	−5	13	Qualification for Relegation play-offs
12	Flénu	13	0	2	11	11	35	−24	2	Qualification for Relegation play-offs

Updated to match(es) played on 15 November 2026. Source: FFA : Compétition D1 FFA (in French)
Rules for classification: 1) Points; 2) Matches won; 3) Goal difference; 4) Goals scored; 5) Away goals scored; 6) Away matches won.

==== Belgian Division 2 ====
===== VV A =====
Pos	Team	Pld	W	D	L	GF	GA	GD	Pts	Qualification or relegation
1	Diksmuide-Oostende	11	7	2	2	20	13	+7	23	Promotion to the 2027–28 Belgian Division 1
2	Voorde-Appelterre	12	6	4	2	17	11	+6	22	Qualification for the Promotion play-offs VV
3	Eendracht Aalst Lede	11	5	4	2	20	15	+5	19	Qualification for the Promotion play-offs VV
4	Petegem Deinze	12	5	4	3	17	14	+3	19	Qualification for the Promotion play-offs VV
5	Oostkamp	12	5	4	3	16	13	+3	19	Qualification for the Promotion play-offs VV
6	Jong KV Mechelen^{U23}	12	5	3	4	25	20	+5	18	
7	Torhout	12	5	3	4	19	16	+3	18	
8	Lebbeke	12	5	1	6	25	23	+2	16	
9	Jong Essevee^{U23}	12	4	4	4	32	26	+6	16	
10	Wetteren	12	4	4	4	21	24	−3	16	
11	Hamme	12	4	4	4	16	21	−5	16	
12	Londerzeel	12	3	6	3	13	14	−1	15	
13	Racing Gent	12	3	3	6	19	22	−3	12	
14	Ninove	12	3	3	6	21	30	−9	12	Qualification for the Relegation play-offs
15	Kalken	12	3	2	7	16	23	−7	11	Relegation to the 2027–28 Belgian Division 3
16	Oudenaarde	12	1	3	8	16	28	−12	6	Relegation to the 2027–28 Belgian Division 3

Updated to match(es) played on 15 November 2026. Source: Voetbal Vlaanderen
Rules for classification: 1) Points; 2) Matches won; 3) Goal difference; 4) Goals scored; 5) Away matches won; 6) Goal difference in away matches; 7) Away goals scored.

===== VV B =====
Pos	Team	Pld	W	D	L	GF	GA	GD	Pts	Qualification or relegation
1	Overijse (Note: Tempo Overijse won the first period and are guaranteed a place in the Promotion play-offs VV.) (T)	12	10	0	2	30	11	+19	30	Promotion to the 2027–28 Belgian Division 1
2	Young Reds Antwerp^{U23}	12	8	0	4	32	10	+22	24	Qualification for the Promotion play-offs VV
3	Wilrijk	12	7	0	5	28	24	+4	21	Qualification for the Promotion play-offs VV
4	Racing Mechelen	12	6	3	3	25	18	+7	21	Qualification for the Promotion play-offs VV
5	STVV Youth^{U23}	12	6	2	4	25	21	+4	20	Qualification for the Promotion play-offs VV
6	Bocholt	12	5	3	4	22	18	+4	18	
7	Termien	12	5	2	5	25	25	0	17	
8	Nijlen	12	5	2	5	16	23	−7	17	
9	De Kempen	12	4	3	5	18	20	−2	15	
10	Rupel Boom	12	4	3	5	14	26	−12	15	
11	Hades	12	4	2	6	25	28	−3	14	
12	Wellen	12	4	2	6	15	19	−4	14	
13	Diegem	12	3	5	4	23	26	−3	14	
14	Rotselaar	12	4	1	7	21	28	−7	13	Qualification for the Relegation play-offs
15	Tongeren	12	1	5	6	19	27	−8	8	Relegation to the 2027–28 Belgian Division 3
16	Cappellen	12	1	5	6	11	25	−14	8	Relegation to the 2027–28 Belgian Division 3

Updated to match(es) played on 15 November 2026. Source: Voetbal Vlaanderen
Rules for classification: 1) Points; 2) Matches won; 3) Goal difference; 4) Goals scored; 5) Away matches won; 6) Goal difference in away matches; 7) Away goals scored.
(T) Qualified, but not yet for the particular phase indicated

===== FFA =====
Pos	Team	Pld	W	D	L	GF	GA	GD	Pts	Qualification or relegation
1	Crossing Schaerbeek	13	8	3	2	38	18	+20	27	Possible promotion to the 2027–28 Belgian Division 1 (Note: Due to the restructuring of the FFA divisions for the 2027–28 season, up to 4 teams may be promoted to Division 1 and only 1 to 2 teams may be relegated. Final qualification spots will be determined by movements in the higher divisions.)
2	St-Ghislain Tertre Hautrage	13	7	4	2	31	20	+11	25	Possible promotion to the 2027–28 Belgian Division 1
3	Eupen U23^{U23}	13	7	3	3	30	22	+8	24	Possible promotion to the 2027–28 Belgian Division 1
4	Braine	13	7	2	4	18	15	+3	23	Possible promotion to the 2027–28 Belgian Division 1
5	Ganshoren	13	7	1	5	28	21	+7	22	
6	Stade Mouscronnois	13	6	3	4	29	26	+3	21	
7	Jette	13	5	6	2	18	17	+1	21	
8	Binche	13	5	4	4	21	23	−2	19	
9	Verviers	13	5	3	5	27	23	+4	18	
10	Ostiches-Ath	13	4	6	3	19	20	−1	18	
11	La Calamine	13	5	2	6	19	16	+3	17	
12	Richelle United	13	5	2	6	22	24	−2	17	
13	Union Hutoise	13	5	2	6	20	22	−2	17	
14	Acren-Lessines	13	4	3	6	22	21	+1	15	
15	Manageoise	13	4	2	7	20	26	−6	14	
16	Stockay	13	3	5	5	10	15	−5	14	
17	Aywaille	13	2	1	10	8	26	−18	7	Possible relegation to the 2027–28 Belgian Division 3
18	Union Namur	13	1	2	10	7	32	−25	5	Relegation to the 2027–28 Belgian Division 3

Updated to match(es) played on 15 November 2026. Source: FFA
Rules for classification: 1) Points; 2) Matches won; 3) Goal difference; 4) Goals scored; 5) Away matches won; 6) Goal difference in away matches; 7) Away goals scored.

==== Belgian Division 3 ====
===== VV A =====
Pos	Team	Pld	W	D	L	GF	GA	GD	Pts	Qualification or relegation
1	Gullegem	12	9	2	1	33	11	+22	29	Promotion to the 2027–28 Belgian Division 2
2	Ieper (T)	12	8	2	2	32	16	+16	26	Qualification for the Promotion play-offs VV
3	Rumbeke	12	8	0	4	28	17	+11	24	Qualification for the Promotion play-offs VV
4	City Pirates	12	7	3	2	30	14	+16	24	Qualification for the Promotion play-offs VV
5	Olsa Brakel	12	7	3	2	19	12	+7	24	Qualification for the Promotion play-offs VV
6	WS Lauwe	12	5	4	3	19	15	+4	19	
7	Avanti Stekene	12	6	0	6	21	14	+7	18	
8	Elene-Grotenberge	12	5	3	4	24	20	+4	18	
9	Blankenberge	12	5	3	4	23	20	+3	18	
10	Drongen	12	4	2	6	15	16	−1	14	
11	St Denijs Sport	12	4	2	6	14	20	−6	14	
12	Erpe-Mere United	12	4	1	7	12	15	−3	13	
13	Zwevegem	12	4	1	7	16	25	−9	13	
14	Berchem Sport	12	3	2	7	16	21	−5	11	Relegation to the 2027–28 Belgian Provincial Leagues
15	Wambeek-Ternat	12	1	1	10	7	40	−33	4	Relegation to the 2027–28 Belgian Provincial Leagues
16	Elewijt	12	0	3	9	8	41	−33	3	Relegation to the 2027–28 Belgian Provincial Leagues

Updated to match(es) played on 15 November 2026. Source: Voetbal Vlaanderen
Rules for classification: 1) Points; 2) Matches won; 3) Goal difference; 4) Goals scored; 5) Away matches won; 6) Goal difference in away matches; 7) Away goals scored.
(T) Qualified, but not yet for the particular phase indicated

===== VV B =====
Pos	Team	Pld	W	D	L	GF	GA	GD	Pts	Qualification or relegation
1	Wezel Sport (T)	14	10	2	2	44	13	+31	32	Promotion to the 2027–28 Belgian Division 2
2	Turnhout	13	8	1	4	37	23	+14	25	Qualification for the Promotion play-offs VV
3	Zepperen-Brustem	13	8	1	4	30	18	+12	25	Qualification for the Promotion play-offs VV
4	Sint-Lenaarts	13	8	1	4	26	21	+5	25	Qualification for the Promotion play-offs VV
5	Achel	13	7	3	3	27	10	+17	24	Qualification for the Promotion play-offs VV
6	Bree-Beek	13	6	3	4	18	14	+4	21	
7	Berg en Dal	14	6	2	6	25	23	+2	20	
8	Huldenberg	13	5	4	4	18	18	0	19	
9	Geel	14	5	4	5	18	24	−6	19	
10	Betekom	13	5	2	6	16	20	−4	17	
11	Schoonbeek-Beverst	13	4	5	4	29	27	+2	17	
12	Esperanza Pelt	13	5	1	7	15	32	−17	16	
13	FC ATO	13	5	0	8	27	33	−6	15	
14	Linden	13	4	1	8	24	38	−14	13	
15	Nieuwmoer	13	3	3	7	20	28	−8	12	Relegation to the 2027–28 Belgian Provincial Leagues
16	Lommel U23^{U23}	13	3	0	10	11	29	−18	9	Relegation to the 2027–28 Belgian Provincial Leagues
17	Lille	13	2	3	8	13	27	−14	9	Relegation to the 2027–28 Belgian Provincial Leagues

Updated to match(es) played on 15 November 2026. Source: Voetbal Vlaanderen
Rules for classification: 1) Points; 2) Matches won; 3) Goal difference; 4) Goals scored; 5) Away matches won; 6) Goal difference in away matches; 7) Away goals scored.
(T) Qualified, but not yet for the particular phase indicated

===== FFA A =====
Pos	Team	Pld	W	D	L	GF	GA	GD	Pts	Qualification or relegation
1	Arquet (T)	12	9	2	1	26	14	+12	29	Promotion to the 2027–28 Belgian Division 2
2	FC Kosova Schaerbeek	12	7	2	3	27	11	+16	23	Promotion to the 2027–28 Belgian Division 2
3	Evelette-Jallet	12	6	5	1	28	23	+5	23	Qualification for the Promotion play-offs FFA (Note: Due to the restructuring of the FFA divisions for the 2027–28 season, there will be 6, 7, 8, or 9 teams promoted to Division 2 and only 1, 2 or 3 teams relegated to the Provincial Leagues. Final qualification spots will be determined by movements in the higher divisions.)
4	Ciney	12	7	1	4	17	20	−3	22	Qualification for the Promotion play-offs FFA
5	Léopold	12	6	3	3	24	18	+6	21	Qualification for the Promotion play-offs FFA
6	Molenbaix	12	5	4	3	20	17	+3	19	Qualification for the Promotion play-offs FFA
7	Soignies	12	5	4	3	21	20	+1	19	
8	Buzet	12	4	5	3	25	21	+4	17	
9	Néchin	11	4	4	3	24	18	+6	16	
10	Biesme	11	4	3	4	17	14	+3	15	
11	Rochefort U23^{U23}	12	3	4	5	17	22	−5	13	
12	Stade Everois	12	3	1	8	23	28	−5	10	
13	Sporting Bruxelles	12	3	1	8	11	21	−10	10	
14	USC Jemappes	12	2	4	6	16	24	−8	10	
15	Monceau	12	2	3	7	16	29	−13	9	Possible relegation to the 2027–28 Belgian Provincial Leagues
16	Saint-Michel	12	0	4	8	12	24	−12	4	Possible relegation to the 2027–28 Belgian Provincial Leagues

Updated to match(es) played on 15 November 2026. Source: D3 FFA série A
Rules for classification: 1) Points; 2) Matches won; 3) Goal difference; 4) Goals scored; 5) Away matches won; 6) Goal difference in away matches; 7) Away goals scored.
(T) Qualified, but not yet for the particular phase indicated

===== FFA B =====
Pos	Team	Pld	W	D	L	GF	GA	GD	Pts	Qualification or relegation
1	Elsautoise (T)	12	10	2	0	39	9	+30	32	Promotion to the 2027–28 Belgian Division 2
2	Verlaine	12	8	4	0	21	3	+18	28	Promotion to the 2027–28 Belgian Division 2
3	Aubel	12	8	1	3	17	10	+7	25	Qualification for the Promotion play-offs FFA (Note: Due to the restructuring of the FFA divisions for the 2027–28 season, there will be 6, 7, 8, or 9 teams promoted to Division 2 and only 1, 2 or 3 teams relegated to the Provincial Leagues. Final qualification spots will be determined by movements in the higher divisions.)
4	Libramontois	12	7	1	4	19	14	+5	22	Qualification for the Promotion play-offs FFA
5	Malmedy	12	5	5	2	19	14	+5	20	Qualification for the Promotion play-offs FFA
6	Sprimont	12	6	1	5	21	16	+5	19	Qualification for the Promotion play-offs FFA
7	FC Ans	12	5	4	3	26	24	+2	19	
8	Momalloise	12	5	1	6	23	17	+6	16	
9	Messancy	12	5	1	6	14	17	−3	16	
10	Habay-la-Neuve U23^{U23}	12	4	3	5	18	18	0	15	
11	Du Geer	12	4	2	6	19	22	−3	14	
12	Meix-dt-Virton	12	3	3	6	9	17	−8	12	
13	Stade Waremmien	12	3	2	7	16	29	−13	11	
14	Mormont	12	2	3	7	19	25	−6	9	
15	Longlier	12	2	2	8	13	28	−15	8	Possible relegation to the 2027–28 Belgian Provincial Leagues
16	Tilff	12	0	3	9	12	42	−30	3	Possible relegation to the 2027–28 Belgian Provincial Leagues

Updated to match(es) played on 15 November 2026. Source: D3 FFA série B
Rules for classification: 1) Points; 2) Matches won; 3) Goal difference; 4) Goals scored; 5) Away matches won; 6) Goal difference in away matches; 7) Away goals scored.
(T) Qualified, but not yet for the particular phase indicated

=== Cup competitions ===
Competition	Winner	Score	Runner-up
2026–27 Belgian Cup		May 2027	
2026 Belgian Super Cup	Union SG	1–1 (5–4 p)	Club Brugge
2026–27 Flemish Cup		May 2027	
2026–27 Cup of Antwerp		May 2027	
2026–27 Cup of East Flanders		May 2027	
2026–27 Cup of Flemish Brabant		May 2027	
2026–27 Cup of Hainaut		May 2027	
2026–27 Cup of Liège		May 2027	
2026–27 Cup of Limburg		May 2027	
2026–27 Cup of Luxembourg		May 2027	
2026–27 Cup of Namur		May 2027	
2026–27 Cup of Walloon Brabant		May 2027	
2026–27 Cup of West Flanders		May 2027	

=== Managerial changes ===
This is a list of changes of managers within Belgian professional league football:

==== Pro League ====
Team	Outgoing manager	Manner of departure	Date of vacancy	Position in the table	Incoming manager	Date of appointment
Zulte Waregem	(Belgium) Steve Colpaert	Moved to assistant role	19 May 2026	Pre-season	(England) Michael Beale	19 May 2026
Anderlecht	(France) Jérémy Taravel	End of caretaker spell	24 May 2026	Pre-season	(Portugal) Vítor Bruno	23 June 2026
Antwerp	(Belgium) Faris Haroun	End of caretaker spell	24 May 2026	Pre-season	(Germany) Marvin Compper	3 August 2026
Beveren	(Netherlands) Marink Reedijk	End of contract	24 May 2026	Pre-season	(Netherlands) Tim Bakens	18 June 2026
OH Leuven	(Belgium) Felice Mazzù	Sacked	27 May 2026	Pre-season	(Belgium) Timmy Simons	23 June 2026
La Louvière	(Belgium) Frédéric Taquin	End of contract	30 June 2026	Pre-season	(England) Edward Still	1 July 2026
Sint-Truiden	(Belgium) Wouter Vrancken	End of contract	30 June 2026	Pre-season	(Belgium) Frédéric De Meyer	1 July 2026
Genk	(Belgium) Nicky Hayen	Signed by Burnley	10 July 2026	Pre-season	(Denmark) Jess Thorup	14 July 2026
Cercle Brugge	(Denmark) Lars Friis	Sacked	2 November 2026	17th	(Portugal) Pedro Caixinha	2 November 2026
La Louvière	(England) Edward Still	Sacked	8 November 2026	17th	(Belgium) Sven Vandenbroeck	12 November 2026

== League competitions (Women's) ==
=== Super League ===
==== Regular season ====
Pos	Team	Pld	W	D	L	GF	GA	GD	Pts	Qualification
1	Anderlecht Women	8	7	0	1	20	4	+16	21	Qualification for Champions play-offs
2	Club YLA	8	5	3	0	18	7	+11	18	Qualification for Champions play-offs
3	Les Louviéroises	9	4	3	2	13	8	+5	15	Qualification for Champions play-offs
4	Genk Ladies	9	4	2	3	9	10	−1	14	Qualification for Champions play-offs
5	OH Leuven Women	9	3	4	2	19	8	+11	13	Qualification for Play-offs 2
6	Standard Femina	9	4	0	5	11	22	−11	12	Qualification for Play-offs 2
7	Essevee Women	9	1	0	8	8	18	−10	3	Qualification for Play-offs 2
8	Gent Ladies	9	1	0	8	6	27	−21	3	Qualification for Play-offs 2

Updated to match(es) played on 15 November 2026. Source: proleague.be
Rules for classification: 1) points; 2) matches won; 3) goal difference; 4) goals scored; 5) away matches won; 6) away goal difference; 7) away goals made

==== Championship Play-offs ====
Pos	Team	Pld	W	D	L	GF	GA	GD	Pts	Qualification	TBD	TBD	TBD	TBD
1	TBD	0	0	0	0	0	0	0	0	Qualification for the Champions League second qualifying round	—			
2	TBD	0	0	0	0	0	0	0	0	Qualification for the Champions League second qualifying round		—		
3	TBD	0	0	0	0	0	0	0	0	Qualification for the Europa Cup first qualifying round			—	
4	TBD	0	0	0	0	0	0	0	0					—

First match(es) will be played: 2 April 2027. Source: proleague.com
Legend: Blue = home team win; Yellow = draw; Red = away team win.
Rules for classification: 1) Points; 2) Points without (possible) half points added due to rounding; 3) Regular season finishing position

==== Play-offs 2 ====
Pos	Team	Pld	W	D	L	GF	GA	GD	Pts	TBD	TBD	TBD	TBD
1	TBD	0	0	0	0	0	0	0	0	—			
2	TBD	0	0	0	0	0	0	0	0		—		
3	TBD	0	0	0	0	0	0	0	0			—	
4	TBD	0	0	0	0	0	0	0	0				—

First match(es) will be played: 2 April 2027. Source: proleague.com
Legend: Blue = home team win; Yellow = draw; Red = away team win.
Rules for classification: 1) points; 2) goal difference; 3) goals scored

== Deaths ==
- 21 July 2026: Erwin Vandendaele, 81, Belgium, Club Brugge, Anderlecht, Reims, Gent and Tournai midfielder.
- 12 September 2026: James Storme, 83, Gent, Standard Liège, Union SG and VG Oostende midfielder, and manager of several clubs, including Beerschot.
- 3 November 2026: Toni Brogno, 53, joint top scorer in the 1999–2000 Belgian First Division and striker for Westerlo, Charleroi, OH Leuven, Olympic Charleroi and Sedan.

== Retirements ==
- 8 June 2026: Divock Origi, 31, former Belgium and Liverpool forward.
- 28 July 2026: Massimo Bruno, 32, former Charleroi, Anderlecht, RB Leipzig, Red Bull Salzburg, Bursaspor, Kortrijk and Francs Borains winger.

== See also ==
- 2026–27 Belgian Pro League
- 2026–27 Challenger Pro League
- 2026–27 Belgian Division 1
- 2026–27 Belgian Division 2
- 2026–27 Belgian Division 3
- 2026–27 Belgian Cup
- 2026 Belgian Super Cup
