= 2026–27 Belgian Division 2 =

Belgian Division 2
- Season: 2026–27
- Dates: August 2026 –

The 2026–27 Belgian Division 2 will be the eleventh season of the division in its current format, placed at the fourth-tier of football in Belgium.

== Team changes ==
=== In ===
Relegated from the Belgian Division 1:

- Diegem, Ninove, Namur, Schaerbeek and Stockay.

Promoted from the Belgian Division 3:

- VV champions: Overijse (VV A) and De Kempen (VV B).
- FFA champions: Mouscron and Eupen U23.
- VV play-off winners: Eendracht Aalst Lede, Voorde-Appelterre and Wilrijk.
- FFA play-off winners: St-Ghislain Tertre Hautrage.

=== Out ===
Promoted to the 2026–27 Belgian Division 1:

- VV champions: Mandel United (VV A) and Heist (VV B).
- FFA champion: Onhaye.
- Play-off winners: Harelbeke and Flénu.

Relegated to the 2026–27 Belgian Division 3:

- Berchem, Berg en Dal, Gullegem, Westhoek, Sporting Bruxelles, Tilff and Tournai.
- Raeren-Eynatten was voluntarily relegated to the Belgian Provincial Leagues.

=== Internal moves ===
Londerzeel moved from VV B to VV A for geographical balance.

== Belgian Division 2 VV A ==
Locations of the 2026–27 Belgian Division 2 VV A teams

=== League table ===
| Pos | Team | Pld | W | D | L | GF | GA | GD | Pts | Qualification or relegation |
|---|---|---|---|---|---|---|---|---|---|---|
| 1 | Diksmuide-Oostende | 11 | 7 | 2 | 2 | 20 | 13 | +7 | 23 | Promotion to the 2027–28 Belgian Division 1 |
| 2 | Voorde-Appelterre | 12 | 6 | 4 | 2 | 17 | 11 | +6 | 22 | Qualification for the Promotion play-offs VV |
| 3 | Eendracht Aalst Lede | 11 | 5 | 4 | 2 | 20 | 15 | +5 | 19 | Qualification for the Promotion play-offs VV |
| 4 | Petegem Deinze | 12 | 5 | 4 | 3 | 17 | 14 | +3 | 19 | Qualification for the Promotion play-offs VV |
| 5 | Oostkamp | 12 | 5 | 4 | 3 | 16 | 13 | +3 | 19 | Qualification for the Promotion play-offs VV |
| 6 | Jong KV Mechelen^{U23} | 12 | 5 | 3 | 4 | 25 | 20 | +5 | 18 | |
| 7 | Torhout | 12 | 5 | 3 | 4 | 19 | 16 | +3 | 18 | |
| 8 | Lebbeke | 12 | 5 | 1 | 6 | 25 | 23 | +2 | 16 | |
| 9 | Jong Essevee^{U23} | 12 | 4 | 4 | 4 | 32 | 26 | +6 | 16 | |
| 10 | Wetteren | 12 | 4 | 4 | 4 | 21 | 24 | −3 | 16 | |
| 11 | Hamme | 12 | 4 | 4 | 4 | 16 | 21 | −5 | 16 | |
| 12 | Londerzeel | 12 | 3 | 6 | 3 | 13 | 14 | −1 | 15 | |
| 13 | Racing Gent | 12 | 3 | 3 | 6 | 19 | 22 | −3 | 12 | |
| 14 | Ninove | 12 | 3 | 3 | 6 | 21 | 30 | −9 | 12 | Qualification for the Relegation play-offs |
| 15 | Kalken | 12 | 3 | 2 | 7 | 16 | 23 | −7 | 11 | Relegation to the 2027–28 Belgian Division 3 |
| 16 | Oudenaarde | 12 | 1 | 3 | 8 | 16 | 28 | −12 | 6 | Relegation to the 2027–28 Belgian Division 3 |

Updated to match(es) played on 15 November 2026. Source: Voetbal Vlaanderen
Rules for classification: 1) Points; 2) Matches won; 3) Goal difference; 4) Goals scored; 5) Away matches won; 6) Goal difference in away matches; 7) Away goals scored.

=== Period champions ===
| Period | Matchdays | Champion |
|---|---|---|
| 1 | 1–10 | To be determined (Note: Period 1 is still undecided: Voorde-Appelterre lead with 18 points, while Aalst Lede and Diksmuide-Oostende (17 points each) still have to play each other in their postponed matchday 9 match on 19 December 2026.) |
| 2 | 11–20 | To be determined |
| 3 | 21–30 | To be determined |

=== Results ===
| Home \ Away | DIK | EAL | ESS^{U23} | GEN | HAM | KAL | KVM^{U23} | LEB | LON | NIN | OOS | OUD | PET | TOR | V-A | WET |
|---|---|---|---|---|---|---|---|---|---|---|---|---|---|---|---|---|
| Diksmuide-Oostende | — | | | | 0–0 | 1–0 | | 3–1 | | 5–3 | 2–1 | | | | 1–0 | |
| Eendracht Aalst Lede | | — | 4–3 | | | 1–2 | 3–2 | | | 3–0 | | | | | | 2–2 |
| Jong Essevee^{U23} | | | — | 3–3 | | | | | 0–0 | | | 2–2 | | 3–3 | 1–2 | 2–3 |
| Racing Gent | 1–2 | | | — | | | 1–1 | | 0–2 | | | 1–0 | | | 0–1 | 5–1 |
| Hamme | | 1–1 | 1–6 | 0–3 | — | | | 3–2 | | | 0–2 | | | 1–1 | | |
| Kalken | | | 1–3 | | | — | | 1–3 | | | 0–0 | 2–3 | | 3–1 | | 4–1 |
| Jong KV Mechelen^{U23} | 1–1 | | 4–2 | | | 3–0 | — | 4–1 | | | 1–1 | | | 2–1 | | |
| Lebbeke | | 1–1 | | | | | | — | 3–0 | 5–0 | 1–2 | | 2–3 | | | 3–2 |
| Londerzeel | 3–2 | | | | 0–1 | 1–1 | 2–1 | | — | | | | 3–4 | | 1–1 | |
| Ninove | | | | 7–4 | 0–2 | 4–2 | 3–2 | | | — | | | 1–1 | | | 0–2 |
| Oostkamp | | 0–1 | 3–6 | 1–0 | | | | | 0–0 | 0–0 | — | 4–2 | | | | |
| Oudenaarde | 0–1 | 0–2 | | | | | 1–2 | 2–3 | | 3–3 | | — | | | 1–1 | |
| Petegem Deinze | | | 0–1 | 0–0 | 2–1 | 2–0 | | | | | 0–2 | 3–1 | — | | | |
| Torhout | 3–2 | 3–1 | | 4–1 | | | | 2–0 | 0–0 | | | | 1–0 | — | | |
| Voorde-Appelterre | | 1–1 | | | 1–3 | | 4–2 | | | 1–0 | | | 1–1 | 2–0 | — | |
| Wetteren | | | | | 3–3 | | | | 1–1 | | | 4–1 | 1–1 | 1–0 | 0–2 | — |

Updated to match(es) played on 15 November 2026. Source: Voetbal Vlaanderen
Legend: Blue = home team win; Yellow = draw; Red = away team win.

== Belgian Division 2 VV B ==
Locations of the 2026–27 Belgian Division 2 VV B teams

=== League table ===
| Pos | Team | Pld | W | D | L | GF | GA | GD | Pts | Qualification or relegation |
|---|---|---|---|---|---|---|---|---|---|---|
| 1 | Overijse (Note: Tempo Overijse won the first period and are guaranteed a place in the Promotion play-offs VV.) (T) | 12 | 10 | 0 | 2 | 30 | 11 | +19 | 30 | Promotion to the 2027–28 Belgian Division 1 |
| 2 | Young Reds Antwerp^{U23} | 12 | 8 | 0 | 4 | 32 | 10 | +22 | 24 | Qualification for the Promotion play-offs VV |
| 3 | Wilrijk | 12 | 7 | 0 | 5 | 28 | 24 | +4 | 21 | Qualification for the Promotion play-offs VV |
| 4 | Racing Mechelen | 12 | 6 | 3 | 3 | 25 | 18 | +7 | 21 | Qualification for the Promotion play-offs VV |
| 5 | STVV Youth^{U23} | 12 | 6 | 2 | 4 | 25 | 21 | +4 | 20 | Qualification for the Promotion play-offs VV |
| 6 | Bocholt | 12 | 5 | 3 | 4 | 22 | 18 | +4 | 18 | |
| 7 | Termien | 12 | 5 | 2 | 5 | 25 | 25 | 0 | 17 | |
| 8 | Nijlen | 12 | 5 | 2 | 5 | 16 | 23 | −7 | 17 | |
| 9 | De Kempen | 12 | 4 | 3 | 5 | 18 | 20 | −2 | 15 | |
| 10 | Rupel Boom | 12 | 4 | 3 | 5 | 14 | 26 | −12 | 15 | |
| 11 | Hades | 12 | 4 | 2 | 6 | 25 | 28 | −3 | 14 | |
| 12 | Wellen | 12 | 4 | 2 | 6 | 15 | 19 | −4 | 14 | |
| 13 | Diegem | 12 | 3 | 5 | 4 | 23 | 26 | −3 | 14 | |
| 14 | Rotselaar | 12 | 4 | 1 | 7 | 21 | 28 | −7 | 13 | Qualification for the Relegation play-offs |
| 15 | Tongeren | 12 | 1 | 5 | 6 | 19 | 27 | −8 | 8 | Relegation to the 2027–28 Belgian Division 3 |
| 16 | Cappellen | 12 | 1 | 5 | 6 | 11 | 25 | −14 | 8 | Relegation to the 2027–28 Belgian Division 3 |

Updated to match(es) played on 15 November 2026. Source: Voetbal Vlaanderen
Rules for classification: 1) Points; 2) Matches won; 3) Goal difference; 4) Goals scored; 5) Away matches won; 6) Goal difference in away matches; 7) Away goals scored.
(T) Qualified, but not yet for the particular phase indicated

=== Period champions ===
| Period | Matchdays | Champion |
|---|---|---|
| 1 | 1–10 | Overijse |
| 2 | 11–20 | To be determined |
| 3 | 21–30 | To be determined |

=== Results ===
| Home \ Away | BOC | CAP | DEK | DIE | HAD | NIJ | OVE | RCM | ROT | RUP | STR^{U23} | TER | TON | WEL | WIL | YRA^{U23} |
|---|---|---|---|---|---|---|---|---|---|---|---|---|---|---|---|---|
| Bocholt | — | | | | | | 2–1 | 0–2 | | | 0–0 | 3–0 | 2–2 | | | 2–1 |
| Cappellen | 0–6 | — | 3–3 | | | 0–1 | | | | 1–2 | | 3–3 | | 0–0 | | |
| De Kempen | | | — | 1–1 | 3–1 | | | | | | 0–0 | 0–1 | 0–2 | | 4–0 | |
| Diegem | 2–2 | 1–1 | | — | | 1–4 | | | | 2–2 | | 5–2 | 1–0 | | | |
| Hades | 4–0 | | | 0–4 | — | | | | 4–1 | | 1–2 | | | | 2–3 | 3–0 |
| Nijlen | 1–0 | | 1–4 | | 3–3 | — | 0–5 | 1–5 | | | | | | 1–1 | | |
| Overijse | | | 2–0 | 5–2 | 3–0 | | — | 0–1 | | | | | 2–0 | 3–1 | | |
| Racing Mechelen | | 1–3 | | 1–1 | 4–1 | | | — | 2–2 | | | | 4–1 | | | 1–4 |
| Rotselaar | 4–2 | | | | | 0–2 | 1–2 | | — | 3–1 | 0–2 | 5–3 | | | | |
| Rupel Boom | | | 1–3 | | | 1–0 | 1–2 | 0–0 | | — | 2–1 | | | | 4–1 | |
| STVV Youth^{U23} | | 3–0 | | 6–2 | | 1–2 | | | | | — | | 7–5 | 2–1 | 0–5 | |
| Termien | | | | | | | | 3–1 | | 4–0 | 3–1 | — | | 2–0 | 2–3 | 0–2 |
| Tongeren | | 0–0 | | | 3–3 | | | | 3–4 | 0–0 | | 2–2 | — | | 1–2 | |
| Wellen | 1–3 | | 1–0 | | 2–3 | | | 2–3 | 1–0 | | | | | — | | 1–0 |
| Wilrijk | | 4–0 | | 2–1 | | | 2–3 | | 3–1 | | | | | 2–4 | — | 1–2 |
| Young Reds Antwerp^{U23} | | 1–0 | 7–0 | | | 2–0 | 1–2 | | 3–0 | 9–0 | | | | | | — |

Updated to match(es) played on 15 November 2026. Source: Voetbal Vlaanderen
Legend: Blue = home team win; Yellow = draw; Red = away team win.

== Belgian Division 2 FFA ==
Locations of the 2026–27 Belgian Division 2 FFA teams

=== League table ===
| Pos | Team | Pld | W | D | L | GF | GA | GD | Pts | Qualification or relegation |
|---|---|---|---|---|---|---|---|---|---|---|
| 1 | Crossing Schaerbeek | 13 | 8 | 3 | 2 | 38 | 18 | +20 | 27 | Possible promotion to the 2027–28 Belgian Division 1 (Note: Due to the restructuring of the FFA divisions for the 2027–28 season, up to 4 teams may be promoted to Division 1 and only 1 to 2 teams may be relegated. Final qualification spots will be determined by movements in the higher divisions.) |
| 2 | St-Ghislain Tertre Hautrage | 13 | 7 | 4 | 2 | 31 | 20 | +11 | 25 | Possible promotion to the 2027–28 Belgian Division 1 |
| 3 | Eupen U23^{U23} | 13 | 7 | 3 | 3 | 30 | 22 | +8 | 24 | Possible promotion to the 2027–28 Belgian Division 1 |
| 4 | Braine | 13 | 7 | 2 | 4 | 18 | 15 | +3 | 23 | Possible promotion to the 2027–28 Belgian Division 1 |
| 5 | Ganshoren | 13 | 7 | 1 | 5 | 28 | 21 | +7 | 22 | |
| 6 | Stade Mouscronnois | 13 | 6 | 3 | 4 | 29 | 26 | +3 | 21 | |
| 7 | Jette | 13 | 5 | 6 | 2 | 18 | 17 | +1 | 21 | |
| 8 | Binche | 13 | 5 | 4 | 4 | 21 | 23 | −2 | 19 | |
| 9 | Verviers | 13 | 5 | 3 | 5 | 27 | 23 | +4 | 18 | |
| 10 | Ostiches-Ath | 13 | 4 | 6 | 3 | 19 | 20 | −1 | 18 | |
| 11 | La Calamine | 13 | 5 | 2 | 6 | 19 | 16 | +3 | 17 | |
| 12 | Richelle United | 13 | 5 | 2 | 6 | 22 | 24 | −2 | 17 | |
| 13 | Union Hutoise | 13 | 5 | 2 | 6 | 20 | 22 | −2 | 17 | |
| 14 | Acren-Lessines | 13 | 4 | 3 | 6 | 22 | 21 | +1 | 15 | |
| 15 | Manageoise | 13 | 4 | 2 | 7 | 20 | 26 | −6 | 14 | |
| 16 | Stockay | 13 | 3 | 5 | 5 | 10 | 15 | −5 | 14 | |
| 17 | Aywaille | 13 | 2 | 1 | 10 | 8 | 26 | −18 | 7 | Possible relegation to the 2027–28 Belgian Division 3 |
| 18 | Union Namur | 13 | 1 | 2 | 10 | 7 | 32 | −25 | 5 | Relegation to the 2027–28 Belgian Division 3 |

Updated to match(es) played on 15 November 2026. Source: FFA
Rules for classification: 1) Points; 2) Matches won; 3) Goal difference; 4) Goals scored; 5) Away matches won; 6) Goal difference in away matches; 7) Away goals scored.

=== Period champions ===
| Period | Matchdays | Champion |
|---|---|---|
| 1 | 1–10 | St-Ghislain Tertre Hautrage |
| 2 | 11–22 | To be determined |
| 3 | 23–34 | To be determined |

=== Results ===
| Home \ Away | A-L | AYW | BIN | BRA | EUP^{U23} | GAN | HUY | JET | LAC | MAN | MOU | O-A | RIC | SCH | STG | STO | UNA | VEV |
|---|---|---|---|---|---|---|---|---|---|---|---|---|---|---|---|---|---|---|
| Acren-Lessines | — | | | 1–2 | | | | 1–1 | | | | 0–1 | | 2–2 | | 1–1 | 4–1 | 2–3 |
| Aywaille | 0–2 | — | | | 1–4 | | | | | 0–2 | 0–4 | | 2–1 | 1–4 | | | | 1–3 |
| Binche | 2–1 | 0–0 | — | | | 2–1 | 1–2 | | | | 4–4 | | | | | 1–0 | 2–0 | |
| Braine | | | 2–0 | — | | | | | | | | 0–0 | 2–0 | | 2–6 | | 1–2 | 1–0 |
| Eupen U23^{U23} | | | 5–2 | 2–0 | — | | | 3–0 | 1–1 | 4–3 | | | 0–0 | | | | | 4–2 |
| Ganshoren | 2–1 | 2–1 | | | 5–1 | — | | 1–4 | | | 0–2 | | 0–2 | 4–0 | | | | |
| Union Hutoise | | 0–1 | | 2–1 | 3–1 | | — | 1–3 | | | 6–1 | | | 2–2 | | | | |
| Jette | | | | 0–0 | | | | — | | 1–1 | | 0–0 | 3–2 | | 2–2 | | | 1–1 |
| La Calamine | 2–3 | 1–0 | 4–1 | | | 1–0 | 4–1 | | — | | | | | | 0–1 | 0–0 | | |
| Manageoise | 2–3 | | 1–3 | | | 2–4 | 1–0 | | 1–0 | — | | 1–3 | | | 1–1 | | | |
| Stade Mouscronnois | 2–1 | | | 0–2 | 1–1 | | | | 3–4 | 3–2 | — | | 6–2 | | | | | 2–1 |
| Ostiches-Ath | | 1–0 | | | | 2–2 | 1–1 | | | | | — | | 1–5 | | 1–2 | 3–0 | |
| Richelle United | | | 1–1 | | | | | | 3–2 | 0–2 | | 4–1 | — | | 4–0 | | 2–0 | |
| Crossing Schaerbeek | | | | 2–3 | | | | 5–0 | 1–0 | 4–1 | | | 5–1 | — | | | | 4–3 |
| St-Ghislain Tertre Hautrage | | 2–1 | | | | 1–2 | 4–1 | | | | 2–0 | 4–4 | | | — | 3–0 | 1–1 | |
| Stockay | | | | 0–2 | 3–1 | | 2–0 | 0–2 | | | 1–1 | | | 0–0 | | — | | |
| Union Namur | | | | | 1–3 | 2–5 | 0–1 | 0–1 | | | | | | 0–4 | | 0–0 | — | |
| Verviers | | | 2–2 | | | | | | 1–0 | | | 1–1 | | | 2–4 | 3–1 | 5–0 | — |

Updated to match(es) played on 15 November 2026. Source: FFA
Legend: Blue = home team win; Yellow = draw; Red = away team win.

== See also ==
- 2026–27 Belgian Pro League
- 2026–27 Challenger Pro League
- 2026–27 Belgian Division 1
- 2026–27 Belgian Division 3
- 2026–27 Belgian Cup
