= 2024–25 Belgian Division 3 =

Belgian Division 3
- Season: 2024–25
- Dates: 24 August 2024 – 27 April 2025
- Champions: VV A: Mandel United; VV B: Londerzeel; ACFF A: Braine; ACFF B: Richelle United
- Promoted: VV A: Diksmuinde-Oostende, Hamme, Kalken, Mandel United, Wetteren; VV B: Londerzeel, Niljen, Rotselaar; ACFF A: Braine, Flénu, Sporting Bruxelles; ACFF B: Richelle United, Tilff
- Relegated: VV A: Beerschot U23, Stekene, Wielsbeke; VV B: Betekom, Bevel, Lommel SK B ACFF A: Belœil, Jodoigne, Perwez, Rebecq; ACFF B: Gouvy, Hamoir, Oppagne-Wéris
- Matches: 960

The 2024–25 Belgian Division 3 was the ninth season of the division in its current format, placed at the fifth tier of football in Belgium.

== Team changes ==
=== In ===
- Promoted from the Belgian Provincial Leagues were:
  - Champions for each of the provincial leagues: Bevel (Antwerp), Sporting Bruxelles (Brabant ACFF), Rotselaar (Brabant VV), St-Ghislain Tertre Hautrage (Hainaut), Geer (Liège), Achel (Limburg), Harre-Manhay (Luxembourg), Biesme (Namur)
  - In East-Flanders, Drongen took over the promotion spot of champions Munkzwalm, who did not ask for a license and were hence ineligible for promotion.
  - In West-Flanders, provincial league champion K.S.V. Diksmuide merged with neighbours Oostende who ceased to exist after going bankrupt. The new club continues with the matricule number of Diksmuide under the name Diksmuide-Oostende.
  - Due to teams folding or voluntarily relegating at this and higher levels, extra spots opened up:
    - Two extra teams were promoted from Liège: Aubel and Eupen 1963
    - One extra team was promoted from West-Flanders: Lauwe.
  - Winner of the interprovincial round on VV side: De Kempen.
  - Winners of the interprovincial round on ACFF side: Buzet, Evere, Libramont, Loyers, Tilff and R.A.FC Oppagne-Weris
- Clubs relegated based on their finishing position in the 2023–24 Belgian Division 2: City Pirates, Hamoir, Londerzeel, Mandel United, Overijse, Rebecq and Wetteren.

=== Out ===
- The four division champions were directly promoted to the Belgian Division 2: Westhoek (VV A), Termien (VV B), Onhaye (ACFF A) and Union Hutoise (ACFF D).
- Also promoted via promotion play-offs were Aywaille, Berg en Dal, Crossing Schaerbeek, Habay-la-Neuve, Manageoise, Ostiches-Ath, Raeren-Eynatten, Pelt, Roeselare and Wellen.
- To increase the number of U23 teams in the Belgian Division 2 Seraing II were also promoted.
- Relegated to the Belgian Provincial Leagues based on their finishing position were: Aalter, Couvin-Mariembourg, Diest, Eksel, Herstal, Longlier, Pepingen-Halle, Symphorinois, Tamines, Wambeek Ternat, Wanze/Bas-Oha, Witgoor and Wolvertem Merchtem.

== Belgian Division 3 VV A ==
Locations of the 2024–25 Belgian Division 3 VV A teams

=== League table ===
| Pos | Team | Pld | W | D | L | GF | GA | GD | Pts | Qualification or relegation |
|---|---|---|---|---|---|---|---|---|---|---|
| 1 | Mandel United (C, P) | 30 | 21 | 4 | 5 | 64 | 24 | +40 | 67 | Promotion to the 2025–26 Belgian Division 2 |
| 2 | Hamme (P) | 30 | 20 | 4 | 6 | 66 | 36 | +30 | 64 | Qualification for the Promotion play-offs VV |
| 3 | Diksmuide-Oostende (P) | 30 | 18 | 5 | 7 | 46 | 24 | +22 | 59 | Qualification for the Promotion play-offs VV |
| 4 | Kalken (P) | 30 | 16 | 2 | 12 | 61 | 41 | +20 | 50 | Qualification for the Promotion play-offs VV |
| 5 | Wetteren (P) | 30 | 15 | 5 | 10 | 54 | 48 | +6 | 50 | Qualification for the Promotion play-offs VV |
| 6 | Erpe-Mere | 30 | 12 | 8 | 10 | 48 | 40 | +8 | 44 | |
| 7 | Blankenberge | 30 | 12 | 5 | 13 | 43 | 43 | 0 | 41 | |
| 8 | Lede | 30 | 12 | 5 | 13 | 35 | 39 | −4 | 41 | |
| 9 | Drongen | 30 | 11 | 6 | 13 | 49 | 51 | −2 | 39 | |
| 10 | Lauwe | 30 | 11 | 6 | 13 | 34 | 52 | −18 | 39 | |
| 11 | St-Denijs Sport | 30 | 10 | 8 | 12 | 28 | 32 | −4 | 38 | |
| 12 | Elene Grotenberge | 30 | 11 | 3 | 16 | 33 | 42 | −9 | 36 | |
| 13 | Wervik (R) | 30 | 10 | 4 | 16 | 31 | 43 | −12 | 34 | Qualification for the Relegation play-offs VV |
| 14 | Wielsbeke (R) | 30 | 7 | 7 | 16 | 46 | 70 | −24 | 28 | Relegation to the 2025–26 Belgian Provincial Leagues |
| 15 | Beerschot U23 (R) | 30 | 5 | 8 | 17 | 34 | 56 | −22 | 23 | Relegation to the 2025–26 Belgian Provincial Leagues |
| 16 | Stekene (R) | 30 | 5 | 8 | 17 | 35 | 66 | −31 | 23 | Relegation to the 2025–26 Belgian Provincial Leagues |

Source: vbal4
Rules for classification: 1) Points; 2) Matches won; 3) Goal difference; 4) Goals scored; 5) Away matches won; 6) Goal difference in away matches; 7) Away goals scored.
(C) Champions; (P) Promoted; (R) Relegated

=== Period champions ===
- First period: Wetteren (23 Points)
- Second period: Mandel United (25 Points)
- Third period: Mandel United (24 Points)

=== Results ===
| Home \ Away | MAN | HAM | DIK | KAL | WET | E-M | BLA | LED | DRO | LAU | STD | E-G | WER | WIE | BEE | STE |
|---|---|---|---|---|---|---|---|---|---|---|---|---|---|---|---|---|
| Mandel United | — | 2–5 | 3–2 | 3–0 | 5–0 | 4–0 | 2–0 | 1–1 | 1–0 | 2–0 | 0–0 | 2–2 | 2–0 | 3–2 | 1–0 | 4–0 |
| Hamme | 0–2 | — | 2–0 | 0–3 | 0–4 | 0–0 | 2–1 | 5–1 | 4–2 | 2–1 | 2–0 | 1–0 | 3–1 | 6–1 | 4–0 | 2–2 |
| Diksmuide-Oostende | 2–1 | 0–3 | — | 3–1 | 2–0 | 2–1 | 0–2 | 1–0 | 1–0 | 5–0 | 0–0 | 1–0 | 3–0 | 1–1 | 2–1 | 3–0 |
| Kalken | 0–2 | 2–1 | 1–3 | — | 0–1 | 2–3 | 1–0 | 2–1 | 3–0 | 3–0 | 0–3 | 4–0 | 3–1 | 0–0 | 6–2 | 5–1 |
| Wetteren | 3–1 | 3–3 | 0–2 | 2–1 | — | 2–2 | 0–4 | 3–2 | 1–1 | 5–0 | 0–1 | 1–0 | 3–2 | 5–3 | 2–2 | 2–0 |
| Erpe-Mere | 0–1 | 4–2 | 2–0 | 1–0 | 1–2 | — | 6–1 | 0–2 | 1–1 | 2–2 | 1–0 | 1–0 | 1–3 | 3–1 | 3–1 | 4–0 |
| Blankenberge | 0–2 | 0–2 | 2–1 | 0–3 | 4–0 | 2–2 | — | 3–1 | 0–1 | 3–2 | 2–4 | 2–0 | 0–0 | 3–0 | 0–0 | 2–3 |
| Lede | 2–0 | 0–1 | 1–0 | 1–3 | 0–3 | 1–1 | 0–1 | — | 0–2 | 1–1 | 1–2 | 0–3 | 1–0 | 4–1 | 1–0 | 3–1 |
| Drongen | 1–6 | 0–2 | 0–2 | 3–1 | 2–2 | 3–0 | 1–2 | 1–2 | — | 2–2 | 0–2 | 3–0 | 2–1 | 5–3 | 1–0 | 1–3 |
| Lauwe | 0–2 | 1–5 | 0–2 | 1–2 | 0–2 | 2–1 | 2–1 | 0–0 | 3–1 | — | 3–1 | 3–1 | 2–1 | 2–1 | 1–0 | 1–1 |
| St-Denijs Sport | 0–1 | 2–0 | 0–0 | 2–3 | 0–2 | 1–1 | 0–0 | 2–1 | 0–2 | 0–0 | — | 0–3 | 0–1 | 2–2 | 1–0 | 0–2 |
| Elene Grotenberge | 2–1 | 2–3 | 0–1 | 2–1 | 1–0 | 0–3 | 1–2 | 0–1 | 2–4 | 3–1 | 0–2 | — | 1–1 | 2–0 | 3–1 | 1–0 |
| Wervik | 0–0 | 0–1 | 1–3 | 2–1 | 2–0 | 1–0 | 0–2 | 0–1 | 2–1 | 0–1 | 0–1 | 2–1 | — | 3–5 | 0–2 | 4–2 |
| Wielsbeke | 2–5 | 1–1 | 0–2 | 1–6 | 2–0 | 3–2 | 3–2 | 0–1 | 1–1 | 2–0 | 3–1 | 0–1 | 0–1 | — | 3–2 | 1–1 |
| Beerschot U23 | 0–3 | 0–2 | 1–1 | 1–3 | 2–4 | 1–2 | 3–1 | 2–2 | 2–2 | 1–2 | 0–0 | 1–1 | 0–0 | 2–1 | — | 4–3 |
| Stekene | 0–2 | 1–2 | 1–1 | 1–1 | 3–2 | 0–0 | 1–1 | 0–3 | 2–6 | 0–1 | 2–1 | 0–1 | 1–2 | 3–3 | 1–3 | — |

Source: vbal4 (in Dutch)
Legend: Blue = home team win; Yellow = draw; Red = away team win.

== Belgian Division 3 VV B ==
Locations of the 2024–25 Belgian Division 3 VV B teams

=== League table ===
| Pos | Team | Pld | W | D | L | GF | GA | GD | Pts | Qualification or relegation |
|---|---|---|---|---|---|---|---|---|---|---|
| 1 | Londerzeel (C, P) | 30 | 20 | 6 | 4 | 70 | 26 | +44 | 66 | Promotion to the 2025–26 Belgian Division 2 |
| 2 | Nijlen (P) | 30 | 19 | 6 | 5 | 50 | 30 | +20 | 63 | Qualification for the Promotion play-offs VV |
| 3 | Overijse | 30 | 15 | 12 | 3 | 56 | 30 | +26 | 57 | Qualification for the Promotion play-offs VV |
| 4 | Schoonbeek-Beverst | 30 | 16 | 8 | 6 | 59 | 35 | +24 | 56 | Qualification for the Promotion play-offs VV |
| 5 | Rotselaar (P) | 30 | 15 | 5 | 10 | 62 | 53 | +9 | 50 | Qualification for the Promotion play-offs VV |
| 6 | De Kempen | 30 | 13 | 8 | 9 | 54 | 47 | +7 | 47 | |
| 7 | Zepperen-Brustem | 30 | 12 | 7 | 11 | 51 | 40 | +11 | 43 | |
| 8 | Sint-Lenaarts | 30 | 11 | 7 | 12 | 57 | 58 | −1 | 40 | |
| 9 | Zwarte Leeuw | 30 | 11 | 8 | 11 | 37 | 39 | −2 | 41 | |
| 10 | Achel | 30 | 10 | 7 | 13 | 46 | 44 | +2 | 37 | |
| 11 | City Pirates | 30 | 10 | 7 | 13 | 38 | 45 | −7 | 37 | |
| 12 | Turnhout | 30 | 10 | 6 | 14 | 47 | 48 | −1 | 36 | |
| 13 | Geel | 30 | 9 | 8 | 13 | 39 | 55 | −16 | 35 | Qualification for the Relegation play-offs VV |
| 14 | Lommel SK B (R) | 30 | 8 | 5 | 17 | 48 | 60 | −12 | 29 | Relegation to the 2025–26 Belgian Provincial Leagues |
| 15 | Betekom (R) | 30 | 5 | 4 | 21 | 33 | 72 | −39 | 19 | Relegation to the 2025–26 Belgian Provincial Leagues |
| 16 | Bevel (R) | 30 | 2 | 4 | 24 | 28 | 93 | −65 | 10 | Relegation to the 2025–26 Belgian Provincial Leagues |

Source: vbal4
Rules for classification: 1) Points; 2) Matches won; 3) Goal difference; 4) Goals scored; 5) Away matches won; 6) Goal difference in away matches; 7) Away goals scored.
(C) Champions; (P) Promoted; (R) Relegated

=== Period champions ===
- First period: Londerzeel (22 Points)
- Second period: Londerzeel (20 Points)
- Third period: Nijlen (26 Points)

=== Results ===
| Home \ Away | LON | NIJ | OVE | S-B | ROT | DEK | ZEP | ZWL | STL | ACH | C-P | TUR | GEE | LOM | BET | BEV |
|---|---|---|---|---|---|---|---|---|---|---|---|---|---|---|---|---|
| Londerzeel | — | 2–2 | | 3–0 | 2–0 | 7–0 | 1–0 | 2–0 | 5–1 | 2–1 | 3–0 | 2–1 | 1–2 | 2–2 | 1–0 | 5–2 |
| Nijlen | 1–0 | — | 0–1 | 2–1 | 1–1 | 2–1 | 1–0 | 1–1 | 1–1 | 3–1 | 1–0 | 1–4 | | 1–0 | 3–1 | 1–1 |
| Overijse | 2–1 | | — | 0–0 | 2–0 | 2–0 | 1–1 | 3–0 | 2–1 | 2–0 | 0–0 | 1–0 | 3–3 | 3–2 | 2–0 | 3–0 |
| Schoonbeek-Beverst | 1–1 | 0–2 | 1–1 | — | 2–3 | 3–3 | 2–1 | 0–0 | 4–2 | | 4–0 | 0–0 | 2–2 | 3–0 | 6–0 | 5–1 |
| Rotselaar | 0–4 | 0–1 | 1–1 | 3–2 | — | 7–3 | 1–1 | 2–2 | | 1–5 | 2–0 | 2–0 | 5–1 | 3–2 | 4–0 | 4–2 |
| De Kempen | 1–3 | 1–1 | 1–1 | 3–0 | 0–0 | — | 4–2 | 2–3 | 2–3 | 0–1 | 1–0 | 1–0 | 4–1 | | 3–0 | 3–1 |
| Zepperen-Brustem | | 1–0 | 4–2 | 0–1 | 3–0 | 1–1 | — | 1–2 | 1–2 | 2–2 | 0–1 | 2–1 | 2–1 | 2–3 | 3–1 | 5–0 |
| Zwarte Leeuw | 0–1 | 1–2 | 1–3 | 0–1 | 2–0 | 0–1 | 3–1 | — | 2–2 | 1–0 | | 1–0 | 0–2 | 2–1 | 0–0 | 2–1 |
| Sint-Lenaarts | 1–2 | 2–3 | 1–0 | 2–2 | 1–4 | 1–1 | | 0–1 | — | 2–3 | 3–0 | 4–0 | 2–0 | 3–3 | 1–0 | 6–1 |
| Achel | 2–0 | 1–3 | 2–1 | 0–2 | 3–0 | 0–3 | 0–1 | 2–2 | 3–0 | — | 2–1 | | 1–2 | 4–1 | 6–2 | 0–1 |
| City Pirates | 0–3 | 1–3 | 2–2 | | 2–1 | 1–1 | 1–2 | 0–0 | 3–2 | 1–1 | — | 2–2 | 6–2 | 3–1 | 3–0 | 3–0 |
| Turnhout | 1–3 | 2–1 | 1–1 | 1–2 | 1–2 | | 2–3 | 3–1 | 2–2 | 0–0 | 1–2 | — | 3–1 | 2–5 | 3–0 | 5–1 |
| Geel | 0–2 | 1–0 | 3–3 | 0–1 | 3–5 | 0–1 | 1–1 | 1–1 | 0–0 | 2–2 | 0–1 | 1–3 | — | 1–0 | | 0–0 |
| Lommel SK B | 0–4 | 2–3 | 1–2 | 2–3 | 1–2 | 0–2 | 1–1 | 2–0 | 1–2 | 1–1 | 2–0 | 1–0 | 1–2 | — | 3–1 | |
| Betekom | 2–2 | 2–3 | 1–1 | 1–3 | | 3–1 | 0–2 | 2–3 | 1–3 | 0–0 | 2–1 | 3–4 | 1–2 | 0–4 | — | 4–0 |
| Bevel | 0–2 | 0–2 | 1–5 | 1–3 | 0–2 | 2–4 | 0–4 | | 0–3 | 3–2 | 2–2 | 0–1 | 1–2 | 2–2 | 1–3 | — |

Updated to match(es) played on 6 April 2025. Source: vbal4 (in Dutch)
Legend: Blue = home team win; Yellow = draw; Red = away team win.

== Belgian Division 3 ACFF A ==
Locations of the 2024–25 Belgian Division 3 ACFF A teams

=== League table ===
| Pos | Team | Pld | W | D | L | GF | GA | GD | Pts | Qualification or relegation |
|---|---|---|---|---|---|---|---|---|---|---|
| 1 | Braine (C, P) | 26 | 18 | 7 | 1 | 64 | 27 | +37 | 61 | Promotion to the 2025–26 Belgian Division 2 |
| 2 | Flénu (P) | 26 | 16 | 4 | 6 | 65 | 32 | +33 | 52 | Qualification for the Promotion play-offs ACFF |
| 3 | Sporting Bruxelles (P) | 26 | 15 | 3 | 8 | 46 | 26 | +20 | 48 | Qualification for the Promotion play-offs ACFF |
| 4 | Evere | 26 | 14 | 4 | 8 | 74 | 51 | +23 | 46 | Qualification for the Promotion play-offs ACFF |
| 5 | Arquet | 26 | 14 | 4 | 8 | 48 | 42 | +6 | 46 | Qualification for the Promotion play-offs ACFF |
| 6 | St-Ghislain Tertre Hautrage | 26 | 12 | 8 | 6 | 46 | 28 | +18 | 44 | |
| 7 | Monceau | 26 | 12 | 5 | 9 | 48 | 35 | +13 | 41 | |
| 8 | Ciney | 26 | 9 | 4 | 13 | 37 | 50 | −13 | 31 | |
| 9 | Biesme | 26 | 7 | 5 | 14 | 42 | 49 | −7 | 26 | |
| 10 | Loyers | 26 | 7 | 5 | 14 | 32 | 60 | −28 | 26 | |
| 11 | Buzet | 26 | 6 | 7 | 13 | 30 | 56 | −26 | 25 | |
| 12 | Aische | 26 | 5 | 7 | 14 | 23 | 48 | −25 | 22 | |
| 13 | Jodoigne | 26 | 5 | 5 | 16 | 28 | 50 | −22 | 20 | Qualification for the Relegation play-offs ACFF |
| 14 | Rebecq (R) | 26 | 4 | 8 | 14 | 31 | 60 | −29 | 20 | Relegation to the 2025–26 Belgian Provincial Leagues |
| 15 | Perwez (Note: Following three consecutive forfeits Perwez were forced to forfeit the remainder of their season and to be relegated to the Belgian Provincial Leagues) (R) | 0 | 0 | 0 | 0 | 0 | 0 | 0 | 0 | Disqualified, Relegation to the 2025–26; Belgian Provincial Leagues |
| 16 | Belœil (Note: Following three consecutive forfeits Beloeil were forced to forfeit the remainder of their season and to be relegated to the Belgian Provincial Leagues) (R) | 0 | 0 | 0 | 0 | 0 | 0 | 0 | 0 | Disqualified, Relegation to the 2025–26; Belgian Provincial Leagues |

Source: RBFA
Rules for classification: 1) Points; 2) Matches won; 3) Goal difference; 4) Goals scored; 5) Away matches won; 6) Goal difference in away matches; 7) Away goals scored.
(C) Champions; (P) Promoted; (R) Relegated

=== Period champions ===
- First period: Sporting Bruxelles (25 Points)
- Second period: Flénu (21 Points)
- Third period: Braine (20 Points)

=== Results ===
| Home \ Away | BRA | FLE | EVE | SPO | STG | ARQ | MON | CIN | BUZ | BIE | LOY | JOD | AIS | REB |
|---|---|---|---|---|---|---|---|---|---|---|---|---|---|---|
| Braine | — | 5–3 | | 3–0 | 3–0 | 5–1 | 3–1 | 2–1 | 2–0 | 4–1 | 2–0 | 3–2 | 3–2 | 2–2 |
| Flénu | 1–1 | — | 2–1 | | 2–1 | 0–1 | 4–0 | 1–2 | 3–2 | 2–1 | 9–1 | 2–2 | 4–0 | 4–0 |
| Evere | 4–0 | | — | 0–1 | 2–2 | 5–3 | 3–2 | 5–1 | 6–2 | 2–1 | 4–1 | 2–2 | 3–0 | 5–1 |
| Sporting Bruxelles | 1–2 | 1–0 | 4–1 | — | | 3–1 | 1–1 | 3–1 | 3–0 | 4–0 | 4–2 | 2–1 | 0–1 | 4–0 |
| St-Ghislain Tertre Hautrage | 3–3 | 3–0 | 4–2 | 2–2 | — | 2–1 | 0–0 | 2–2 | 5–0 | 1–0 | 5–0 | 1–0 | 4–0 | 1–0 |
| Arquet | 1–1 | 1–5 | 2–2 | 1–0 | 0–1 | — | | 1–3 | 0–0 | 2–1 | 3–1 | 3–2 | 2–2 | 2–1 |
| Monceau | 1–1 | 2–1 | 6–3 | 0–0 | 0–3 | 4–0 | — | 3–1 | | 1–1 | 4–0 | 0–1 | 3–0 | 1–0 |
| Ciney | 0–1 | 1–2 | 2–5 | 1–0 | 1–0 | 1–5 | 1–0 | — | 1–3 | | 2–2 | 0–2 | 2–0 | 1–1 |
| Buzet | 0–0 | 3–3 | 1–3 | 1–2 | 1–1 | 0–4 | 3–2 | 0–2 | — | 1–0 | 3–3 | 1–1 | 1–0 | |
| Biesme | 1–1 | 0–4 | 1–3 | 1–2 | 0–3 | 2–3 | 2–3 | 1–2 | 3–1 | — | 3–0 | | 5–1 | 1–1 |
| Loyers | 0–3 | 1–3 | 4–1 | 0–2 | 0–1 | 0–1 | 2–0 | | 2–1 | 1–3 | — | 2–1 | 1–1 | 1–1 |
| Jodoigne | 0–4 | 0–1 | 1–7 | 1–0 | 2–1 | 0–1 | 2–3 | 2–1 | 0–0 | 0–2 | 2–3 | — | | 1–1 |
| Aische | | 1–2 | 1–2 | 2–1 | 0–0 | 0–5 (Note: Forfeit loss for Aische as the game could not be completed due to a powercut.) | 0–1 | 2–2 | 1–3 | 0–0 | 0–0 | 3–0 | — | 3–3 |
| Rebecq | 1–5 | 1–4 | 2–1 | 2–5 | 1–1 | 0–2 | 1–3 | 3–1 | 1–2 | 2–2 | 1–3 | 3–2 | 0–2 | — |

Source: (in Dutch)
Legend: Blue = home team win; Yellow = draw; Red = away team win.

== Belgian Division 3 ACFF B ==
Locations of the 2024–25 Belgian Division 3 ACFF B teams

=== League table ===
| Pos | Team | Pld | W | D | L | GF | GA | GD | Pts | Qualification or relegation |
|---|---|---|---|---|---|---|---|---|---|---|
| 1 | Richelle United (C, P) | 30 | 21 | 6 | 3 | 79 | 24 | +55 | 69 | Promotion to the 2025–26 Belgian Division 2 |
| 2 | Elsautoise | 30 | 16 | 7 | 7 | 60 | 36 | +24 | 55 | Qualification for the Promotion play-offs ACFF |
| 3 | Sprimont | 30 | 15 | 9 | 6 | 59 | 32 | +27 | 54 | Qualification for the Promotion play-offs ACFF |
| 4 | Du Geer | 30 | 15 | 5 | 10 | 48 | 42 | +6 | 50 | Qualification for the Promotion play-offs ACFF |
| 5 | Tilff (P) | 30 | 13 | 10 | 7 | 46 | 36 | +10 | 49 | Qualification for the Promotion play-offs ACFF |
| 6 | Mormont | 30 | 12 | 12 | 6 | 50 | 37 | +13 | 48 | |
| 7 | Aubel | 30 | 11 | 10 | 9 | 48 | 34 | +14 | 43 | |
| 8 | Meix-dt-Virton | 30 | 12 | 6 | 12 | 39 | 42 | −3 | 42 | |
| 9 | Eupen 1963 | 30 | 13 | 2 | 15 | 48 | 64 | −16 | 41 | |
| 10 | Harre-Manhay | 30 | 10 | 9 | 11 | 44 | 50 | −6 | 39 | |
| 11 | Marloie | 30 | 11 | 5 | 14 | 43 | 55 | −12 | 38 | |
| 12 | Waremmien | 30 | 10 | 7 | 13 | 52 | 45 | +7 | 37 | |
| 13 | Libramont | 30 | 10 | 5 | 15 | 44 | 51 | −7 | 35 | Qualification for the Relegation play-offs ACFF |
| 14 | Gouvy (R) | 30 | 8 | 5 | 17 | 38 | 61 | −23 | 29 | Relegation to the 2025–26 Belgian Provincial Leagues |
| 15 | Hamoir (R) | 30 | 5 | 6 | 19 | 28 | 60 | −32 | 21 | Relegation to the 2025–26 Belgian Provincial Leagues |
| 16 | Oppagne-Weris (R) | 30 | 3 | 6 | 21 | 27 | 84 | −57 | 15 | Relegation to the 2025–26 Belgian Provincial Leagues |

Source: RBFA
Rules for classification: 1) Points; 2) Matches won; 3) Goal difference; 4) Goals scored; 5) Away matches won; 6) Goal difference in away matches; 7) Away goals scored.
(C) Champions; (P) Promoted; (R) Relegated

=== Period champions ===
- First period: Richelle United (25 Points)
- Second period: Elsautoise (22 Points)
- Third period: Richelle United (24 Points)

=== Results ===
| Home \ Away | RIC | SPR | ELS | DUG | TIL | MOR | MEI | AUB | EUP | MAR | HAR | LIB | WAR | GOU | HAM | OPP |
|---|---|---|---|---|---|---|---|---|---|---|---|---|---|---|---|---|
| Richelle United | — | 2–1 | 1–1 | 1–1 | 4–1 | 1–0 | 2–0 | 1–1 | 3–2 | | 7–0 | 2–1 | 1–1 | 4–0 | 3–1 | 6–0 |
| Sprimont | 3–2 | — | 2–1 | 2–0 | | 0–0 | 2–2 | 3–1 | 4–1 | 2–0 | 1–1 | 3–0 | 4–0 | 4–3 | 3–1 | 2–0 |
| Elsautoise | | 2–2 | — | 2–4 | 1–3 | 1–1 | 3–0 | 0–1 | 2–0 | 1–0 | 3–2 | 3–0 | 1–0 | 2–2 | 5–2 | 1–1 |
| Du Geer | 2–1 | 1–0 | 0–5 (Note: Due to insufficient lighting the game was called off and later the away side were awarded a forfeit victory.) | — | 2–0 | 1–1 | 0–1 | 1–0 | 1–2 | 1–5 | 2–0 | 5–1 | 3–1 | | 3–0 | 1–1 |
| Tilff | 1–1 | 1–0 | 1–0 | 1–0 | — | 3–1 | 3–1 | 2–1 | 6–0 | 1–0 | 0–1 | 0–3 | 2–2 | 4–2 | | 0–1 |
| Mormont | 2–3 | 1–1 | 2–2 | | 0–0 | — | 2–1 | 2–1 | 1–2 | 2–2 | 5–0 | 1–1 | 3–0 | 2–1 | 2–0 | 1–1 |
| Meix-dt-Virton | 0–1 | 2–2 | | 1–0 | 1–1 | 1–1 | — | 2–1 | 2–1 | 4–0 | 0–0 | 3–1 | 3–2 | 0–1 | 0–0 | 3–0 |
| Aubel | 1–1 | 1–1 | 1–1 | 1–1 | 0–0 | 3–5 | 2–0 | — | 3–0 | 0–1 | 2–0 | 2–2 | 1–1 | 0–1 | 2–0 | |
| Eupen 1963 | 0–4 | 0–3 | 0–1 | 3–1 | 2–0 | 4–2 | | 2–1 | — | 1–4 | 1–1 | 3–1 | 1–1 | 3–1 | 4–2 | 2–4 |
| Marloie | 0–4 | | 2–3 | 2–3 | 3–3 | 0–1 | 4–0 | 1–2 | 2–1 | — | 0–1 | 1–0 | 2–1 | 0–0 | 1–2 | 3–3 |
| Harre-Manhay | 0–2 | 1–1 | 2–1 | 2–3 | 0–0 | | 4–1 | 3–3 | 4–1 | 1–3 | — | 0–3 | 0–2 | 0–2 | 0–0 | 2–1 |
| Libramont | 0–2 | 4–2 | 0–2 | 1–2 | 5–4 | 2–0 | 1–0 | | 2–3 | 1–2 | 0–0 | — | 2–1 | 4–1 | 0–0 | 4–0 |
| Waremmien | 0–1 | 0–0 | 0–1 | 1–1 | 0–1 | 0–2 | 4–2 | 0–2 | 3–2 | 7–0 | 2–5 | | — | 4–0 | 3–1 | 3–3 |
| Gouvy | 0–1 | 1–6 | 2–1 | 2–1 | 2–2 | 0–0 | 0–2 | 1–2 | | 3–0 | 0–4 | 1–2 | 0–3 | — | 6–0 | 0–0 |
| Hamoir | 0–1 | 1–3 | 0–2 | 0–2 | 1–1 | 2–3 | 0–1 | 0–2 | 1–2 | 0–0 | 1–2 | 1–0 | | 5–1 | — | 2–1 |
| Oppagne-Weris | 0–6 | 1–2 | 0–4 | 0–2 | 0–2 | 1–2 | 1–4 | 1–2 | 1–2 | 0–4 | | 2–1 | 0–3 | 0–2 | 2–3 | — |

Source: vbal4 (in Dutch)
Legend: Blue = home team win; Yellow = draw; Red = away team win.

== Promotion play-offs ==
=== Promotion play-offs VV ===
The play-offs feature eight teams, the two second-place finishers in divisions VV A and VV B as well as from each division the winners of each of the three periods (for periods won by overall champions or runners-up the highest team not yet qualified takes the spot instead). The eight teams play a knockout tournament, with the top two teams being promoted, all teams were unseeded when setting up the draw.

Qualified teams:

- Diksmuide-Oostende (highest place finisher (3rd) not directly qualified from division VV A)
- Hamme (runner-up division VV A)
- Kalken (2nd highest place finisher (4th) not directly qualified from division VV A)
- Nijlen (runner-up division VV B)
- Overijse (highest place finisher (3rd) not directly qualified from division VV B)
- Rotselaar (3rd highest place finisher (5th) not directly qualified from division VV B)
- Schoonbeek-Beverst (2nd highest place finisher (4th) not directly qualified from division VV B)
- Wetteren (winner of the first perpiod in division VV A)

Normally, three extra promotion places are available on VV-side through the promotion-playoffs, but due to the fact that two teams in the Division 2 folded or restarted at the bottom-of the football pyramid, the number of extra places increased to five. As a result, the four round one winners all gained promotion, while the four losing teams continued to play for the fifth and final promotion spot.

Placing 5th/6th
18 May 2025
Rotselaar | 3
Wetteren | 4

Consolation semifinals
9 May 2025
Rotselaar | 5
Overijse | 0
11 May 2025
Schoonbeek-Beverst | 1
Wetteren | 2

Round 1
3 May 2025
Diksmuide-Oostende | 1
Rotselaar | 0
3 May 2025
Nijlen | 3
Overijse | 2
4 May 2025
Hamme | 3
Schoonbeek-Beverst | 1
4 May 2025
Kalken | 5
Wetteren | 3

==== Round 1 ====
3 May 2025
18:00 CEST

| Diksmuide-Oostende | 1–0 (a.e.t.) | Rotselaar |
|---|---|---|
| Janssens 115' (pen.) | Report |

Batimont Solar Park, Ostend
Attendance: 2,750

3 May 2025
20:15 CEST

| Nijlen | 3–2 (a.e.t.) | Overijse |
|---|---|---|
| Dejonghe 57', 84'; Verlinden 119' | | Delooz 8'; Houssane 38' |

4 May 2025
15:00 CEST

| Hamme | 3–1 | Schoonbeek-Beverst |
|---|---|---|
| Vandekerckhove 27'; Soumahoro 33', 48' | | Vanheukelom 17' |

4 May 2025
16:00 CEST

| Kalken | 5–3 | Wetteren |
|---|---|---|
| Poppe 2'; Moeraert 18', 57'; Buyl 69'; Elewaut 85' (pen.) | | Joye 29', 34', 55' |

Diksmuide-Oostende, Hamme, Kalken, and Nijlen all got promoted to the Belgian Division 2. The four losing teams moved to the consolation round to determine who got the final promotion spot.

==== Consolation Round ====
9 May 2025
20:30 CEST

| Rotselaar | 5–0 | Overijse |
|---|---|---|
| G. Boogaerts 2'; Tobbackx 22'; Van Grunderbeeck 36', 83'; Hambrouck 74' | Report |

11 May 2025
15:00 CEST

| Schoonbeek-Beverst | 1–2 | Wetteren |

Rotselaar and Wetteren moved to the 5th/6th place match to determine who got the final promotion spot. Overijse and Schoonbeek-Beverst were eliminated.

==== 5th/6th place ====
18 May 2025
15:00 CEST

| Rotselaar | 3–4 | Wetteren |
|---|---|---|
| Hambrouck 17'; J. Boogaerts 32'; Van Grunderbeeck 34' | | Van Calenbergh 43', 45'; Panneel 55'; Joye 82' |

Wetteren got promoted to Belgian Division 2. Because Jong Genk was ultimately not relegated to Division 1, Rotselaar was also promoted to Division 2.

=== Promotion play-offs ACFF ===
The play-offs feature eight teams, the two second-place finishers in divisions ACFF A and ACFF B as well as from each division the winners of each of the three periods (for periods won by overall champions or runners-up the highest team not yet qualified takes the spot instead). The eight teams play a knockout tournament, with the top two teams being promoted, all teams were unseeded when setting up the draw.

Qualified teams:

- Arquet (highest place finisher (5th) not directly qualified from division ACFF A)
- Du Geer (2nd highest place finisher (4th) not directly qualified from division ACFF B)
- Elsautoise (runner-up division ACFF B)
- Evere (2nd highest place finisher (4th) not directly qualified from division ACFF A)
- Flénu (runner-up division ACFF A)
- Sporting Bruxelles (highest place finisher (3rd) not directly qualified from division ACFF A)
- Sprimont (highest place finisher (3rd) not directly qualified from division ACFF B)
- Tilff (3rd highest place finisher (5th) not directly qualified from division VV B)

Round 1
Flénu | 4
Evere | 0
Elsautoise | 0 (3)
Sporting Bruxelles | 0 (4)
Sprimont | 2 (5)
Du Geer | 2 (3)
Arquet | 2
Tilff | 3

Round 2
Flénu | 2
Sporting Bruxelles | 1
Sprimont | 1
Tilff | 2

Placing 1st/2nd
Flénu | n/a
Tilff | n/a

==== Round 1 ====
4 May 2025
15:00 CEST

| Flénu | 4–0 | Evere |
|---|---|---|
| S. Belasfar 5', 57'; Soares 43'; Ulens 78' | Report |

4 May 2025
15:00 CEST

| Elsautoise | 0–0 (a.e.t.) | Sporting Bruxelles |
|---|---|---|
| | Report |
Penalties
| G. Deville (penalty scored); B. Deville (penalty scored); Lecloux (penalty missed); Fassin (penalty missed); Dirix (penalty scored); Counet (penalty missed) | 3–4 | (penalty missed) Oulhaye; (penalty scored) Ade; (penalty scored) El Amrani; (penalty scored) El Ouarini; (penalty missed) Kanda Kalala; (penalty scored) Necipoglu |

4 May 2025
15:00 CEST

| Sprimont | 2–2 (a.e.t.) | Du Geer |
|---|---|---|
| Lambrecth 52' (pen.); Cokgezen 113' | Report | Derenne 6', 100' |
Penalties
| Gerstmans (penalty scored); Lambrecth (penalty scored); Mondzialo (penalty scored); Fall (penalty scored); Soumahoro (penalty scored) | 5–3 | (penalty scored) Vigil Bajo; (penalty scored) Simon; (penalty missed) Von Buxhoeveden; (penalty scored) Docquier |

4 May 2025
15:00 CEST

| Arquet | 2–3 | Tilff |
|---|---|---|
| Martin 9'; Jonckers 62' | Report | Charef 12'; Cokgezen 65'; El Farsi 81' (pen.) |

==== Round 2 ====
11 May 2025
15:00 CEST

| Flénu | 2–1 (a.e.t.) | Sporting Bruxelles |
|---|---|---|
| S. Belasfar 47'; A. Belasfar 102' | Report | Kifoumbi 23' |

11 May 2025
15:00 CEST

| Sprimont | 1–2 | Tilff |
|---|---|---|
| Soumahoro 56' | Report | El Farsi 46'; Dewitte 52' |

==== 3rd/4th place ====
18 May 2025
15:00 CEST

| Sprimont | 1–4 | Sporting Bruxelles |
|---|---|---|
| Cokgezen 85' (pen.) | Report | Afallah 4'; Necipoglu 52'; Kangele 67'; Boudar 77' (pen.) |

Due to uncertainty whether Binche would be awarded a license to play in the Belgian Division 2, it was not clear whether a third team (besides Flénu and Tilff) was going to be promoted. In case Binche was denied a licence, the winner of the match would be promoted.

Sporting Bruxelles won the match for 3rd place and in June received the good news that a spot in the Division 2 will become available because RFC Seraing U-23 withdraw from competition. As a result, Sporting Bruxelles will also promoted to Division 2.

==== Round 3 ====
18 May 2025
15:00 CEST

| Flénu | Not played | Tilff |

As both Flénu and Tilff had already secured promotion to Belgian Division 2, the match was not played.

== Relegation play-offs ==
=== VV ===
The two teams finishing 13th play-off in a single match to determine the order in case any extra relegations are necessary. ASV Geel was drawn at home.

3 May 2025
19:30

| ASV Geel | 2–0 | Wervik |
|---|---|---|
| Van Pol 33' (pen.), 61' | report |

Prior to the match, it was still unclear whether an extra team would be relegated, as the proposed league reform still needed to be voted. As a result, the winner of the match would be spared of relegation, while to loser would need to await the vote and could still be spared if the reform was not approved. As such, after the game, ASV Geel was saved while Wervik remained uncertain at which level they would play the coming season.

=== ACFF ===
The two teams finishing 13th play-off in a single match to determine the order in case any extra relegations are necessary. RCS Libramontois was drawn at home.

4 May 2025
15:00

| Libramont | 4–1 | Jodoigne |
|---|---|---|
| Bodet 31', 41', 52'; Gagban 39' (pen.) | Report | Manoka 2' |

Terrain 1, Libramont
Referee: Clement Dubuc

Both teams remained in Division 3.
