= Antoine Puttaert =

Belgian footballer

Personal information
- Date of birth: 25 October 1919
- Date of death: 2 January 2005 (aged 85)

Youth career
- 1931-1938: Union Saint-Gilloise

Senior career*
Years	Team	Apps	(Gls)
1938-1949	Union Saint-Gilloise		
1949-1952	Racing CB		
1952-1954	RCS Brainois		

International career
1944–1947	Belgium	9	(0)
- * Club domestic league appearances and goals

Antoine Puttaert (25 October 1919 – 2 January 2005) was a Belgian footballer. He played in nine matches for the Belgium national football team from 1944 to 1947.
