= 2026–27 Challenger Pro League =

Challenger Pro League
- Season: 2026–27
- Biggest away win: RSCA Futures 2–6 Lokeren (12 September 2026)
- Highest scoring: RSCA Futures 2–6 Lokeren (12 September 2026); Liège 4–4 Club NXT; 13 September 2026
- Longest winning run: 5 games - Dender
- Longest unbeaten run: 5 games - Dender
- Longest losing run: 3 games - RSCA Futures

The 2026–27 season of the Challenger Pro League is scheduled to begin in August 2026 and end in May 2027. It is the fifth season under its new name after being renamed from First Division B.

== Team changes ==
This season, only one team will be automatically promoted to Belgian Pro League, with a second team to be promoted as winner of the promotion play-offs. The bottom two teams will be relegated and since this season, U23-teams can again be relegated (but not promoted).

=== Incoming ===
- Virton and Hasselt were promoted from the 2025–26 Belgian Division 1, respectively as FFA (Francophone) and VV (Flemish) champions. Virton return to the second tier after 4 years absence, while Hasselt make their debut at this level, although predecessor Hasselt last played at the second level in 1989.
- Dender EH was relegated from the 2025–26 Belgian Pro League, returning after playing two seasons at the top level.

=== Outgoing ===
- Beveren, Kortrijk and Lommel were promoted to the 2026–27 Belgian Pro League, respectively as champions, runners-up, and promotion play-off winners.
- Olympic Charleroi was relegated to the 2026–27 Belgian Division 1 after finishing last.
- RWDM Brussels was also relegated to the 2026–27 Belgian Division 1 after being refused a professional football licence, thus allowing Club NXT who would otherwise have been relegated, to be spared.

=== Controversy about U23-participation and status ===
Originally, as per the vote of February 2025, the members of the Pro League had voted that the U23-teams playing in this division could not be relegated. This meant that in case one or two U23-teams ended in the relegation spots, the next highest non-U23-team would be relegated instead, unless a U23-team of the same wing (FFA: Francophone, VV: Flemish) ended in a promotion spot in the 2026–27 Belgian Division 1. In March 2026, the Belgian Competition Authority (BMA) ruled that this was an illegal and unfair measure compared to the non-U23 teams and that the Pro League was forced to pay a yearly fine of 12 million Euros until the rule was abolished, and in May the BMA even directly overruled the Pro League citing urgency, affecting the ongoing 2025–26 Challenger Pro League season. Ultimately, due to the fact that RWDM Brussels was not awarded a professional licence, Club NXT was spared and this did not affect the relegation. The Pro League ultimately voted to abolish the rule from the 2026–27 season, initially replacing it with a rule that, in case one or two U23 teams are relegated, replacement U23-team(s) should be promoted from the respective wing(s), to always keep the number of U23-teams in the division at a minimum of four. This would have meant that as a result newly promoted U23-teams could be promoted instead of the (non-U23) amateur champions in their wing, despite ending much lower in the standings. The amateur organisations from both the Flemish and Francophone wings rejected this decision and ultimately the Pro League had no other choice than to abolish the rule permanently in the end, but also lowering the participation fee from 1 Mio EUR to 750k EUR per team in the process. There are legal proceedings ongoing related to this decision, as most notably Gent is now claiming that the entire league reform of February 2025 (top-tier expanding to 18 teams without playoffs) needs to be reverted as the "U23-rule" was part of a package deal.

== Team information ==
=== Stadiums and locations ===
Locations of the 2026–27 Challenger Pro League teams

== Regular season ==
=== League table ===
Pos	Team	Pld	W	D	L	GF	GA	GD	Pts	Qualification
1	Beerschot	11	10	0	1	30	9	+21	30	Promoted to Pro League
2	Dender EH	10	6	2	2	14	6	+8	20	Qualification for promotion play-offs
3	Eupen	10	6	1	3	19	12	+7	19	Qualification for promotion play-offs
4	Francs Borains	10	6	0	4	11	12	−1	18	Qualification for promotion play-offs
5	Patro Eisden Maasmechelen	11	5	1	5	17	17	0	16	Qualification for promotion play-offs
6	Hasselt	10	5	1	4	14	16	−2	16	
7	Jong KAA Gent^{U23} (Note: Ineligible for promotion or promotion play-offs)	10	4	3	3	14	14	0	15	
8	Virton	10	4	2	4	17	14	+3	14	
9	Lokeren	10	4	2	4	18	17	+1	14	
10	Lierse	10	3	2	5	10	14	−4	11	
11	Club NXT^{U23}	10	2	4	4	16	23	−7	10	
12	Jong Genk^{U23}	11	2	4	5	15	22	−7	10	
13	Seraing	11	2	3	6	13	18	−5	9	
14	RFC Liège	10	2	2	6	15	22	−7	8	Relegated to National Division 1
15	RSCA Futures^{U23}	10	2	1	7	12	19	−7	7	Relegated to National Division 1

Updated to match(es) played on 22 November 2026. Source: Challenger Pro League
Rules for classification: 1) Points; 2) Matches won; 3) Goal difference; 4) Goals scored; 5) Away matches won; 6) Away goal difference; 7) Away goals made.

=== Positions by round ===
The table lists the positions of teams after each round, with postponed matches and points deductions included only when they occur. Teams with fewer matches played are shown with their position underlined, with each line representing one fewer match.

- Due to storm Austen, the matches scheduled for friday 23 October of matchday 8 were postponed. Both Francs Borains - Dender EH and RSCA Futures - Lierse still were rescheduled to 4 November, between matchdays 9 and 10.

Colored cells indicate promotion (green), participation in promotion play-offs (blue), or relegation play-offs (red). Note that U23 teams are ineligible for promotion and playoffs, and the coloring is adjusted accordingly.

Team ╲ Round	1	2	3	4	5	6	7	8	9	10	11	12	13	14	15	16	17	18	19	20	21	22	23	24	25	26	27	28	29	30
Beerschot	1	5	1	1	1	1	1	1	1	1	1	1	1	1																
Club NXT (Note: ineligible for promotion and playoffs.)	8	6	3	7	8	8	9	9	10	11	11																			
Dender EH	11	7	4	3	2	2	2	2	2	2	2																			
Eupen	2	4	9	4	4	3	3	3	3	3	3																			
Francs Borains	5	10	6	2	5	4	4	5	8	4	4																			
Hasselt	7	3	7	9	7	7	5	6	4	6	6																			
Jong Genk	13	14	12	6	9	9	11	11	11	10	12																			
Jong KAA Gent	15	15	13	12	12	11	10	12	9	9	7																			
Lierse	14	11	8	10	11	12	8	10	12	13	10																			
Lokeren	4	2	5	8	6	6	7	4	6	7	9																			
Patro Eisden Maasmechelen	6	9	11	13	13	13	12	8	7	5	5																			
RFC Liège	9	8	10	11	10	10	13	14	14	15	14																			
RSCA Futures	10	12	15	14	15	15	15	15	15	14	15																			
Seraing	12	13	14	15	14	14	14	13	13	12	13																			
Virton	3	1	2	5	3	5	6	7	5	8	8																			

Updated to match(es) played on 22 November 2026. Source: vbal4.be

== Promotion play-offs ==
=== Promotion/relegation play-offs ===
The promotion/relegation play-offs will be contested by the four highest-eligible finishers who are not already promoted directly. Normally, this will be the teams in positions 2 to 5, unless one of the U23-teams would end up in the top five positions, in which case the next eligible team will take their spot. These four teams are to meet in a knockout tournament with both semi-finals and final over two legs, and the highest season finisher always has home advantage in the return leg. Only the winner of the final will be promoted to the 2027–28 Belgian Pro League.

==== Bracket ====
Semi-finals
5
2
4
3

Final
5/4/3
4/3/2

== Number of teams by provinces ==
Number of teams	Province or region	Team(s)
3	East Flanders	Dender EH, Jong KAA Gent and Lokeren
3	Liège	Eupen, RFC Liège and Seraing
3	Limburg	Hasselt, Jong Genk (Note: Jong Genk plays its home games in Geel, in the province of Antwerp instead of their home province of Limburg.) and Patro Eisden Maasmechelen
2	Antwerp	Beerschot and Lierse
1	Brussels	RSCA Futures (Note: RSCA Futures plays its home games in Deinze, in the province of East-Flanders instead of the Brussels Capital Region.)
1	Hainaut	Francs Borains
1	Luxembourg	Virton
1	West Flanders	Club NXT

== See also ==
- 2026–27 Belgian Pro League
- 2026–27 Belgian Division 1
- 2026–27 Belgian Division 2
- 2026–27 Belgian Division 3
- 2026–27 Belgian Cup
