= KFC Sparta Petegem Deinze =

Association football club in Deinze, Belgium

Sparta Petegem Deinze
- Full name: Koninklijke Football Club Sparta Petegem Deinze
- Short name: Sparta Deinze
- Founded: 1 February 1928; 98 years ago
- Ground: Complex Gaversesteenweg, Petegem-aan-de-Leie
- Capacity: 2,500
- Chairman: Patrick Walgraeve
- Head coach: David Gevaert
- League: Belgian Division 2 VV
- 2025–26: Belgian Division 2 VV A, 7th of 16
- Website: spartadeinze.be
Home colours

Koninklijke Football Club Sparta Petegem Deinze (lit. 'Royal Football Club Sparta Petegem Deinze'), commonly known as Sparta Petegem Deinze or simply Sparta Deinze, is a Belgian football club from Petegem-aan-de-Leie, a borough of Deinze in East Flanders. The club was founded on 1 February 1928 and is registered with the Royal Belgian Football Association (KBVB) under matricule 3821. It plays at the Complex Gaversesteenweg and competes in the Belgian Division 2, the fourth tier of Belgian football.

Sparta spent its first eight decades in the provincial leagues of East Flanders. It reached the national divisions for the first time in 2008 and won promotion to the Belgian Third Division in 2015, the highest level it has reached.

The club adopted its present name in 2026. After the bankruptcy of its neighbour KMSK Deinze in December 2024, figures from the defunct club joined the Sparta board and the city's footballing identity passed to Petegem.

== History ==
=== Foundation and early years ===
FC Sparta Petegem was founded on 1 February 1928 and joined the Belgian Football Association immediately. The original colours were mauve and white. The first home matches were played on a field known as Den Dries, behind what is now the Olympia clubhouse. During World War II the club temporarily left the national association for the Katholiek Vlaams Sportverbond.

Sparta wore mauve and white until 1946, the year it merged with neighbouring Padro Deinze.

In the middle of the 1950s the board decided that the infrastructure needed replacing. Members dismantled the installations at Den Dries by hand and moved a short distance to a new ground on the Gaversesteenweg. The move was marked by a large parade through the neighbourhood.

=== Rivalry with Deinze ===
The new ground coincided with the club's first success. Sparta reached the highest provincial division for the first time in the 1957–58 season and won the fair-play award at both national and provincial level.

A relegation to the second provincial division followed in the 1960s, but Sparta returned to the top provincial level in 1966. At the end of that decade it spent one season in a higher division than SK Deinze. Deinze recovered quickly and drew level, which produced several charged derbies. Sparta could not hold its place and dropped back to the second provincial division in 1977, while Deinze went up to the Fourth Division and pulled away for good.

The club's lowest point came in 1986, when it fell to the third provincial division. Sparta finished thirteenth the following season and narrowly avoided a further relegation. It won the third provincial title in 1989 and went back up, only to be relegated again a year later. A fresh climb began in 1993 with another promotion to the second provincial division.

=== Rise to the national divisions ===
Sparta reached the highest provincial division and stayed there for nine seasons. It won the title in the 2007–08 season under Patrick Moens, who had already led the club to one championship, and entered national football for the first time in its eightieth year.

The club spent four seasons in the Belgian Fourth Division. In the 2010–11 season it reached the final of the promotion play-off, losing at Le Canonnier in Mouscron. A heavily disrupted 2011–12 season ended in eighth place. Sparta then took 40 points in the 2012–13 season and was relegated to the first provincial division.

The squad stayed together and Sparta led the provincial division from the opening weeks of the 2013–14 season, finishing as champions on 74 points. The team lost no home match that season, and the motto Domi Semper Invicti, meaning always unbeaten at home, was added to a new club crest introduced in 2014.

Sparta won the Fourth Division championship on 66 points in the 2014–15 season, finishing ahead of Sint-Niklaas, Ronse, Harelbeke and Ingelmunster. It was the club's first promotion to the Belgian Third Division. Sparta finished sixth in the 2015–16 season.

The 2016 reform of Belgian football renamed the Third Division as the Second Amateur Division and moved it to the fourth tier. Sparta was placed in the A series, won the first period title without losing a match and finished second overall in the 2016–17 season. The club has remained at the fourth level since.

=== Renaming as Sparta Petegem Deinze ===
KMSK Deinze was declared bankrupt on 11 December 2024. The club was not refounded and there was no interest in restarting a side in the fourth provincial division.

On 11 December 2025, exactly a year after the bankruptcy, Sparta announced that it would play under the name KFC Sparta Petegem Deinze from the 2026–27 season, with a new crest and the colours green, black and orange. Figures from KMSK Deinze joined a strengthened board and brought additional contacts and sponsorship. Co-chairman Bernard Vermeulen described the arrangement as the best chance of keeping football in Deinze rather than an attempt to restart KMSK Deinze. Vermeulen said the project was an integration of the core of KMSK Deinze into Petegem rather than a merger. The matricule 3821 was retained.

The first team continued to play on the Gaversesteenweg. Around 440 youth players moved to a central training base at the Brielmeersen, the former youth site of KMSK Deinze. Chairman Patrick Walgraeve said the aim was to keep young players in the city and guide them towards the first team. Mayor Rutger De Reu said the loss of KMSK Deinze had been a disaster for supporters and players and that the new club restored ambition to football in Deinze. More than 800 people attended the presentation.

David Gevaert was appointed head coach on 2 April 2026 on a two-year contract. He had managed Sparta between 2005 and 2007 and KMSK Deinze between 2019 and 2021. He succeeded Stijn Meert.

== Ground ==
Sparta has played at the Complex Gaversesteenweg in Petegem-aan-de-Leie since the mid-1950s. The ground holds 2,500 spectators and stands at Gaversesteenweg 240. Before the move the club played on Den Dries.

== Honours ==
- Belgian Fourth Division
  - Winners: 2014–15
- First Provincial East Flanders
  - Winners: 2007–08, 2013–14
- Third Provincial East Flanders
  - Winners: 1989
