= KV Oostende =

Former Belgian football club

- Full name: Koninklijke Voetbalclub; Oostende
- Nickname: De Kustboys
- Short name: Oostende
- Founded: 1904; 122 years ago
- Dissolved: 14 May 2024; 2 years ago
- Ground: Diaz Arena, Ostend
- Capacity: 8,400
- 2023–24: Challenger Pro League, 13th of 16
| Home colours | Away colours | Third colours |

Koninklijke Voetbalclub Oostende, also called KV Oostende (Dutch pronunciation: [kaːˌveː oːstˈɛndə]) or KVO, was a Belgian professional football club based in Ostend, West Flanders. Founded in 1904, the club was declared bankrupt in June 2024.

== History ==
=== Early years and merger ===
Old logo used until 2021 when a new logo was presented

The club was founded in 1904 as VG Oostende (Vanneste Genootschap Oostende) and had matricule number 31. In 1911, another club was created, AS Oostende, which would soon become the best club of the city, playing regularly in the second division in the 1930s. In the mid-1970s, AS reached the first division while VG was playing at the second level.

The two clubs merged in 1981 to become KV Oostende. The new club played in the third division for eleven years, before finally being promoted. In its first season on the second level, Oostende were immediately promoted again, to the first division, where it would achieve its best result in the club history: a seventh place, in 1993–94.

From 1995 to 2013, Oostende played in the second division, except in 1998–99 and 2004–05, when it was at the higher level again, and in 2001–02 and 2002–03, when it played in the third division.

In 1982, one year after the merger, VG Oostende had been re-founded at the lowest level of the Belgian football competition. The club first used the Armenonville stadium, which was the original ground of VG. In 2001, the stadium was declared unsafe, so the club had to groundshare with KV Oostende in the Albertparkstadion, until 2010. In 2013, the new VG Oostende also disappeared, after a financial breakdown.

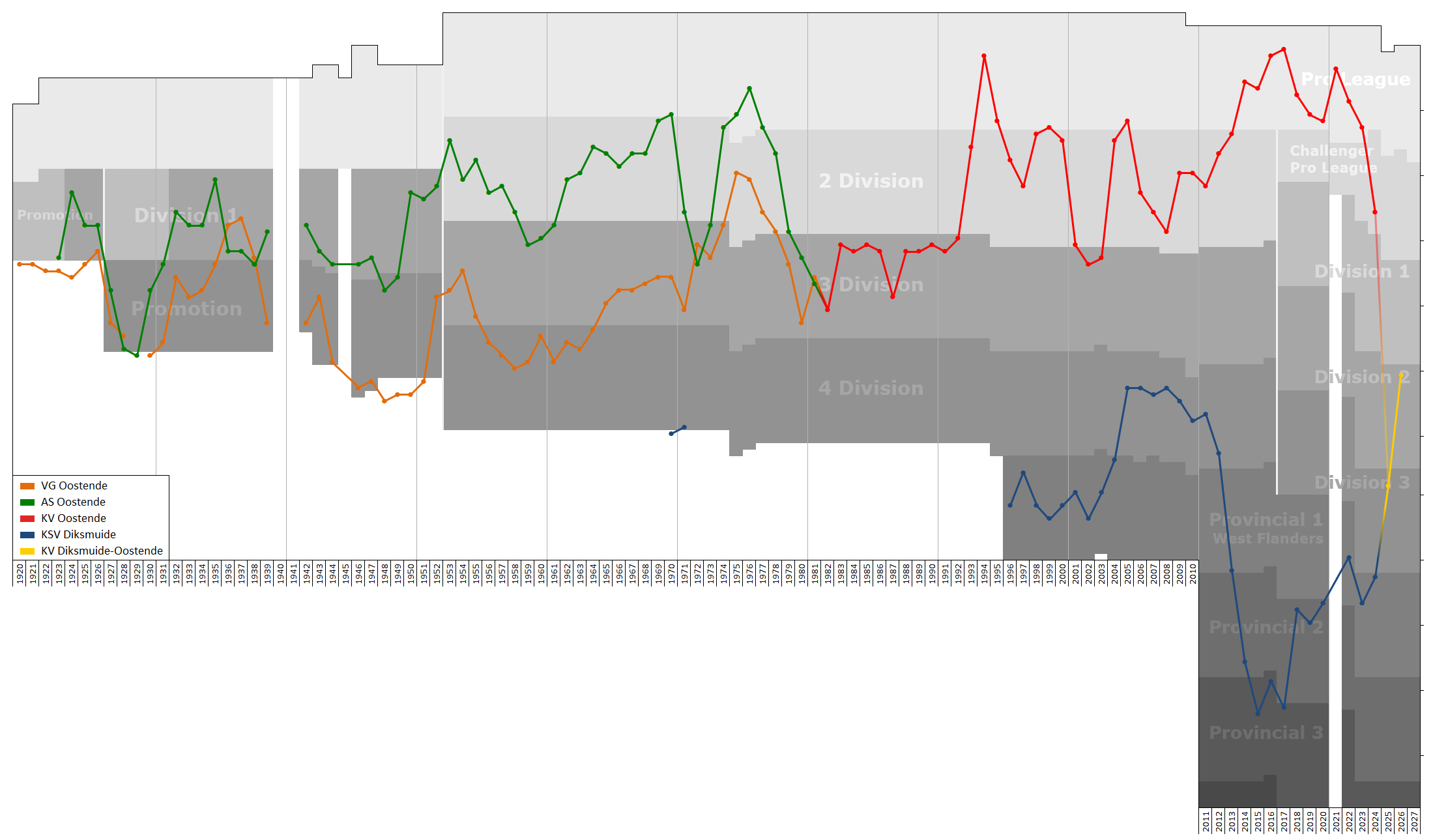
Historical chart of KV Oostende league performance

=== Success in 2010s ===
In August 2013, shortly after a new promotion to the highest level, it was announced that chairman and majority shareholder Yves Lejaeghere would be succeeded by a new chairman, businessman Marc Coucke.

In the spring of 2016, the main tribune of the Albertparkstadion was rebuilt and the stadium was renamed the Versluys Arena with the capacity increased to 8,432.

Thanks to its success in the previous campaign, Oostende played in the third qualifying round of the Europa League in the 2017–18 season, drawing French giants Marseille. Oostende was unable to go any further in the competition after losing 4–2 in France on 17 July 2017 and only securing a goalless draw at home on 3 August. Marseille would go on to reach the finals in the Europa League that season, falling short to Atlético Madrid.

After a disappointing beginning to the 2017–18 season, manager Yves Vanderhaeghe was set free of his obligations, with the assistant manager, Adnan Čustović, being asked to take over.

In December 2017 Marc Coucke announced that he would be leaving, after recently purchasing Anderlecht. It was then announced on 8 February 2018 that Peter Callant would replace Coucke as chairman. Coucke confirmed his continued interest in the club and that he remained a fan and would stay on as a minority shareholder.

=== Buyout and decline ===
In May 2020 an investment group acquired KV Oostende Football Club and the new investors include Paul Conway of Pacific Media Group, Chien Lee of NewCity Capital, Randy Frankel of Partners Path Capital and Krishen Sud.

On 15 April 2023, KV Oostende was officially relegated from the Belgian Pro League to the Challenger Pro League after being defeated 4–0 by OH Leuven after ten years in the top tier. On 21 December 2023, the club incurred a deduction of three points, followed by an additional six points on 22 December. As a result, KV Oostende found themselves bottom of the Challenger Pro League standings with only seven points. These penalties stemmed from the club's failure to meet repayment deadlines, compounded by their existing debt of €8 million.

On 16 May 2024, it was announced that the club would file for bankruptcy on 3 June 2024 due to the failure to obtain a professional license, an insurmountable debt burden for the Belgian Division 2, and a failed takeover. On 4 June, the commercial court in Bruges declared KV Oostende bankrupt. On 13 June, it was revealed that newly promoted third-tier club KSV Diksmuide intended to collaborate with the city of Ostend to form a new team under the name Koninklijke Voetbalclub Diksmuide-Oostende. The youth teams of Diksmuide and Ostend would continue training at their current facilities, while the first team would play its matches at the stadium in Ostend.

In June 2025, it was revealed that ex-owner and co-founder of Pacific Media Group (PMG) Paul Conway had been in prison in Spain for over 5 weeks, fighting extradition to Belgium. In July, he was successfully extradited to Belgium and placed under electronic surveillance. He was wanted for questioning following an investigation by the Belgian Federal Police Sports Fraud Team, in relation to 6 fraud allegations linked to KV Oostende's bankruptcy. Central to this was the 2021 purchase of striker Mickaël Biron from AS Nancy Lorraine, another team in PMG's portfolio. Biron was purchased by Oostende for a club-record €5 million, but was immediately loaned back to AS Nancy Lorraine and was then sold to RWDM at the end of the season for €2.5 million, without playing a game for Oostende.

== Honours ==
- Belgian Cup:
  - Runners-up: 2016–17
- Belgian Second Division:
  - Winners (2): 1997–98, 2012–13
- Belgian Second Division final round:
  - Winners (2): 1992–93, 2003–04

== Managers ==
- (Netherlands) Han Grijzenhout (1981–82)
- (Socialist Federal Republic of Yugoslavia) Nedeljko Bulatović (1982–84)
- (Belgium) Luc Sanders (1986–87)
- (Netherlands) Dennis van Wijk (30 September 1996 – 30 June 1998)
- (Belgium) Jean-Marie Pfaff (1 October 1998 – 4 February 1999)
- (Belgium) Leo Van der Elst (1999–00)
- (Denmark) Kenneth Brylle (1 July 2001 – 30 June 2003)
- (Belgium) Gilbert Bodart (17 May 2003 – 10 January 2005)
- (Belgium) Mohsen Akhondi (13 January 2005 – 30 June 2005)
- (Belgium) Willy Wellens (1 July 2006–07)
- (Netherlands) Dennis van Wijk (20 November 2007 – 10 December 2007)
- (Belgium) Kurt Bataille (interim) (11 December 2007 – 30 June 2008)
- (Belgium) Jean-Pierre Vande Velde (1 July 2008 – 4 March 2009)
- (Belgium) Thierry Pister (3 March 2009 – 14 February 2011)
- (Belgium) Frederik Vanderbiest (16 February 2011–15)
- (Belgium) Yves Vanderhaeghe (2015–2017)
- (Bosnia and Herzegovina) Adnan Čustović (interim) (17 September 2017 – 17 October 2017)
- (Bosnia and Herzegovina) Adnan Čustović (17 October 2017 – 30 June 2018)
- (Belgium) Gert Verheyen (2018–2019)
- (Norway) Kåre Ingebrigtsen (2019)
- (Netherlands) Dennis van Wijk (31 December 2019 – 2 March 2020)
- (Bosnia and Herzegovina) Adnan Čustović (4 March 2020 – 7 June 2020)
- (Germany) Alexander Blessin (7 June 2020 – 19 January 2022)
- (Belgium) Yves Vanderhaeghe (11 February 2022 – 31 October 2022)
- (Austria) Dominik Thalhammer (1 November 2022 – 30 June 2023)
- (Belgium) Stijn Vreven (1 July 2023 – 3 December 2023)
- (United States) Jamath Shoffner (15 January 2024 – 4 June 2024)
