= RCS Brainois =

Belgian association football club

- Full name: Royal Cercle Sportif Brainois
- Founded: 1913; 113 years ago
- Stadium: Gaston Reiff Stadium
- Capacity: 3,000
- President: Didier Van Hoof
- Sporting director: Henri Pensis
- Coach: Olivier Suray
- League: Belgian Division 2
- 2024–25: Belgian Division 3 ACFF A, 1st of 16 (promoted)
- Website: www.rcsbrainois.com/
Home colours

Royal Cercle Sportif Brainois commonly known as RCS Brainois or simply Braine is a Wallonian Belgian football club from Braine-l'Alleud, Brabant. Founded in 1913, club is assigned matricule nr.75 and is one the oldest continuously existing clubs in the country. The team set to play in Belgian Division 2 from 2025–26, the fourth tier of Belgian football after promotion from Belgian Division 3 in 2024–25.

== History ==
The club was founded in 1913 by 11 founding members. under the name Cercle Sportif Branois. In 1926, when the matricule system was established, club was assigned matricule nr.75, which it has kept to this day.

Throughout its history, the club has spent 32 seasons at national level, of which 12 were in the third tier.

Between 1946 and 1969 the club was continuously in the lower national league, however since they have been oscillating between the provincial leagues and national amateur tiers.

Over the years the most famous players were Antoine Puttaert and Fernand Voussure, both former internationals who finished their career at the club, and Philippe Saint-Jean who spent six seasons in the 70s with them before returning as a coach in the late 80s.

== Honours and achievements ==
- Belgian Fourth Division
  - Champions: 1956–57
- Belgian Division 3
  - Champions: 2024–25
  - Runners-up: 2018–19
- Belgian Cup
  - Fourth round: 2005-06
