= KV Diksmuide-Oostende =

- Full name: Koninklijke Voetbalclub Diksmuide-Oostende
- Founded: 1934; 92 years ago (as KSV Diksmuide); 2024; 2 years ago (as KV Diksmuide-Oostende)
- Ground: Batimont Solar Park, Oostende
- Chairman: Frederik Willaert
- League: Belgian Division 2
- 2025–26: Belgian Division 2 VV A, 2nd of 16
- Website: https://kv-do.be
Home colours	Away colours

Koninklijke Voetbalclub Diksmuide-Oostende, commonly known as KVDO, formerly KSV Diksmuide, is a Belgian football club from Oostende, previously Diksmuide. Founded in 1934 as KSV Diksmuide under matricule number 1972, in 2024 they merged with the recently bankrupted KV Oostende to form KVDO. They currently play in Belgian Division 2, the fourth tier of Belgian football. They also have a women's team and a large youth academy.

== History ==
=== KSV Diksmuide (1934-2024) ===
KSV Diksmuide was established in 1934. The club started in the lower regional leagues and remained in the provincial leagues for the following decades.

In 1970, the club was promoted to the national Fourth Division for the first time. However, Diksmuide only remained in the league for a single season, finishing last and returning back down to the provincial leagues.

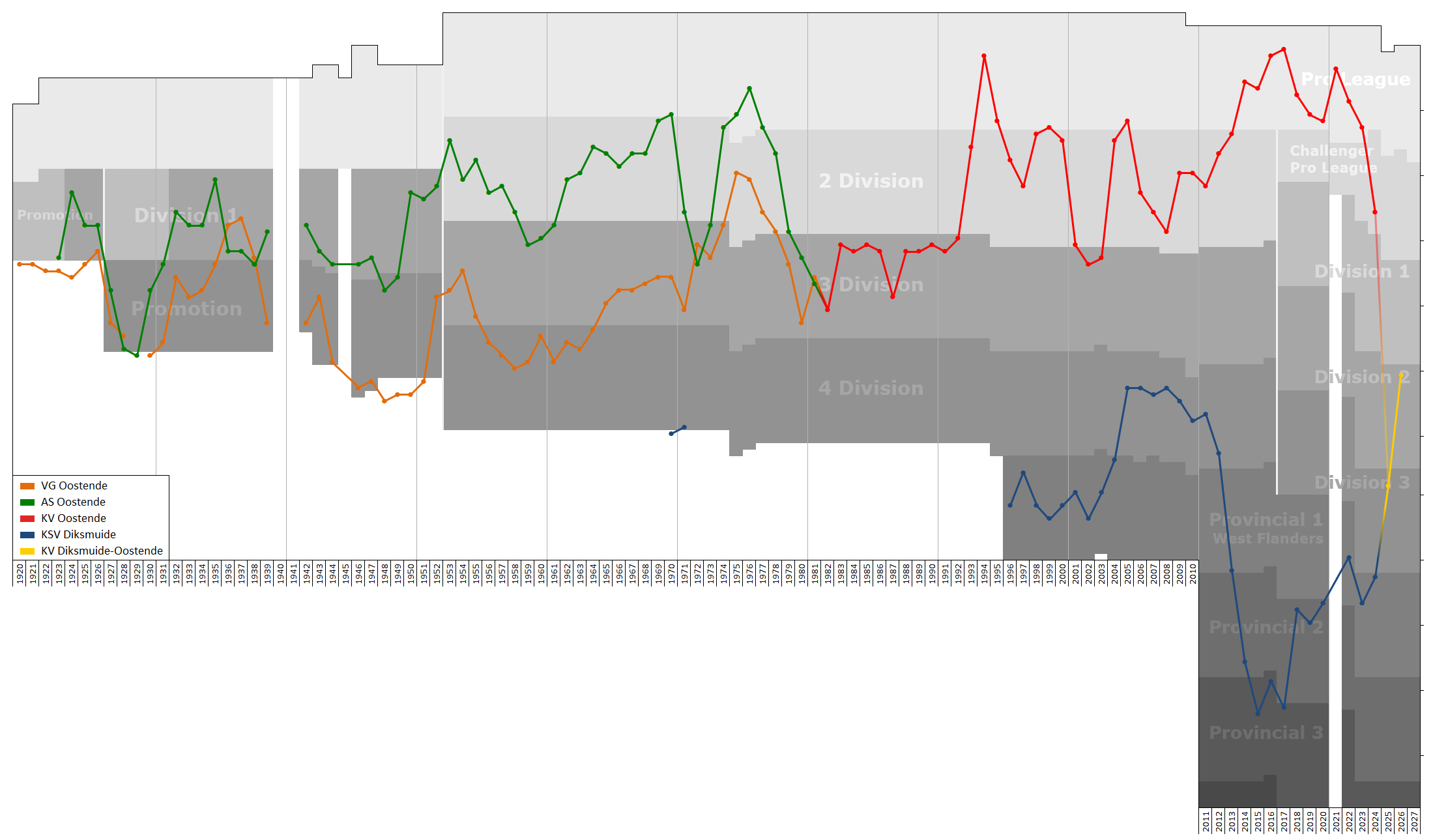
Historical league performance chart of Diksmuide-Oostende and its predecessors

In 2004, Diksmuide were again promoted to the national leagues, subsequently finishing sixth in the 2004–05 Fourth Divison A. This time the club managed to stay longer, competing in Division A for nine seasons until their relegation back to the provincial level in 2012.

From 2012–2014, Diksmuide suffered back-to-back relegations dropping them from the national Fourth Division A into the West Flanders Third Provincial A. In 2015–16, they finished second in the Third Provincial A behind S.K. Nieuwkerke but lost in the first play-off round to eventual winners SV Moorslede. In 2016–17, after three seasons in the division, Diksmuide won the Third Provincial A League, having led for 225 days of the season.

After promotion the year before, in 2017–18 Diksmuide achieved a second place finish in the Second Provincial A but again lost in the first round of the promotion play-offs, this time to SVV Damme after conceding a 94th minute goal. In 2019, they became a partner club of Club Brugge's youth academy, Club NXT. After a top four finish in 2018–19, in 2019–20 Diksmuide found themselves top of the division by seven points with five games remaining when the COVID-19 pandemic halted the season. Diksmuide were subsequently declared champions and promoted into the West Flanders First Provincial A.

The 2020–21 First Provincial A was also curtailed by COVID-19, with Diksmuide playing just four games. Over the next two seasons they remained in the division, finishing 9th and 5th respectively, including a loss in the second round of the interprovincial promotion play-offs against Limburg's Achel VV in 2022–23. In 2023–24, a dominant performance saw Diksmuide storm to the championship, losing just once all season and finishing 16 points ahead of second-place White Star Lauwe. Diksmuide's promotion to Division 3 was their third in eight seasons, returning to the national leagues for the first time since 2012.

=== KV Diksmuide-Oostende (2024-present) ===
Following the conclusion of the 2023–24 season, it was announced that Diksmuide had make an agreement with the City of Oostende to merge with KV Oostende, a professional club most recently competing in the Challenger Pro League that had recently declared bankruptcy. As part of the agreement the newly formed KV Diksmuide-Oostende (KVDO) would play its home games in the Batimont Solar Park, the former home of KV Oostende, while the youth team of KSV Diksmuide would continue to play its games at De Pluimen.

In 2024–25, the clubs' first season after merging, Diksmuinde-Oostende secured promotion to Belgian Division 2 after winning the promotion play-off. They continued their good form in 2025–26, exceeding expectations by challenging for the Divison 2 title. In February, a 1–0 victory over league leaders Mandel United allowed KVDO to move into first, but they failed to capitalise and took just 4 points out of the next 12 available. Manager Dieter Vandendriessche was replaced by Kurt Delaere, who secured a 2nd place finish but suffered an unexpected loss to Harelbeke in the promotion play-offs.

== Results ==
Season	Level									Series	Points	Remarks
	I		II	III	IV	P.I	P.II	P.III	P.IV			
2004–05					6					Fourth Division A	47	
2005–06					6					Fourth Division A	50	
2006–07					7					Fourth Division A	42	
2007–08					5					Fourth Division A	48	
2008–09					7					Fourth Division A	50	
2009–10					7					Fourth Division A	40	
2010–11					8					Fourth Division A	39	
2011–12					14					Fourth Division A	23	
2012–13						16				First prov. W.-Vl.	16	
2013–14							14			Second prov. W.-Vl. A	25	
2014–15								6		Third prov. W.-Vl. A	48	
2015–16								2		Third prov. W.-Vl. A	61	Lost in playoffs to Moorslede (2–3 on aggregate)
	1A	1B	1Am	2Am	3Am	P.I	P.II	P.III	P.IV	Since the 2016-17 season, there are 3 national and 2 regional levels		
2016–17								1		Third prov. W.-Vl. A	71	Champions
2017–18							2			Second prov. W.-Vl. A	58	Lost in playoffs to Damme (2–3 on aggregate)
2018–19							4			Second prov. W.-Vl. A	58	
2019–20							1			Second prov. W.-Vl. A	61	Champions, season ended early due to the COVID-19 pandemic
2020–21										First prov. W.-Vl.		Canceled due to the COVID-19 pandemic
2021–22						9				First prov. W.-Vl.	35	
2022–23						5				First prov. W.-Vl.	49	Won in playoffs against Vlaamse Ardennen (2–1), then lost to Achel (1–3)
2023–24						1				First prov. W.-Vl.	81	Champions
as KV Diksmuide-Oostende
2024–25					3					Division 3 VV A	59	Won in playoffs against Sportief Rotselaar (1–0)
2025–26				2						Division 2 VV A	61	Lost in playoffs to Harelbeke (1–2)
2026–27										Division 2 VV A		
