= Sportief Rotselaar =

- Full name: Sportief Rotselaar
- Founded: April 6, 1966; 60 years ago (as Voetbalclub Rotselaar)
- Ground: Sportoase Ter Heide, Rotselaar
- League: Belgian Division 2
- 2025–26: Belgian Division 2, VV B, 15th of 16
- Website: www.sportiefrotselaar.be
Home colours

Sportief Rotselaar is a Belgian association football club based in Rotselaar, in the province of Flemish Brabant. Founded in 1966 as Voetbalclub Rotselaar, the club has competed under its current name since 1994. It is affiliated to the Royal Belgian Football Association under matricule number 6909, and plays in yellow and blue. After a rapid rise through the provincial leagues and two spells in the Belgian national divisions during the 1970s and 1980s, the club spent decades in the provincial leagues before climbing back to national level in the 2020s. Sportief Rotselaar competes in Belgian Division 2 (VV B), the fourth tier of Belgian football, in the 2026–27 season.

== History ==
=== Foundation and rise to Division 2 (1966–1978) ===
The club was founded on 6 April 1966 as Voetbalclub Rotselaar and affiliated to the Belgian Football Association, starting out in the lowest provincial division. It progressed quickly through the provincial ranks and reached the national Fourth Division (then called Promotion) for the first time in 1973, finishing as runner-up behind Stade Leuven in its debut season. Because the top division was being expanded to 20 clubs, the number of promotion places from the lower divisions was doubled that year, and VC Rotselaar also advanced to the Belgian Third Division.

In the Third Division, Rotselaar again performed strongly, finishing fourth in its first season and remaining among the leading clubs in the following years. In 1978 the club won its series after a play-off against KV Turnhout, earning promotion to the Belgian Second Division just fifteen years after starting out in the bottom tier of provincial football.

=== Decline to the provincial leagues (1978–1994) ===
The club's rise was followed by an equally rapid decline. In its only season in the Second Division, VC Rotselaar finished second from bottom and was relegated back to the Third Division. It could not recapture its earlier form, and after finishing bottom of its series in 1982 it dropped to the Fourth Division. A further poor campaign sent the club into the provincial leagues in 1983, ten years after it had left them. The slide continued through the 1980s and early 1990s, with the club eventually falling as far as Fourth Provincial, the lowest level of the Belgian football pyramid. The club was renamed Sportief Rotselaar in 1994.

=== Rebuilding and return to national football (1994–2024) ===
Playing under its new name, the club gradually rebuilt in the Flemish Brabant provincial leagues, winning the Fourth Provincial title and later, in 2015–16, the Third Provincial title to return to Second Provincial football. Since 2012, the club has played its home matches at the Sportoase Ter Heide sports complex on Torenstraat.

The club's rise continued in the following years, culminating in the 2023–24 season, when Sportief Rotselaar won the Flemish Brabant First Provincial title and earned promotion to the lowest national level (tier 5), the Belgian Division 3 for 2024–25 – the club's first season in the national divisions in over four decades.

=== Back-to-back promotions and rise to Division 2 (2024–present) ===
Sportief Rotselaar's first season in the Belgian Division 3 (2024–25) went well enough that the club was handed an additional promotion to Belgian Division 2 (VV B) for 2025–26, filling a vacancy created when Jong KV Mechelen moved from VV B to VV A. The club's own website described it as the start of "a historic season" in the second national amateur division, the club's first Division 2 campaign since 1978–79.

Sportief Rotselaar finished the 2025–26 season in a relegation place in VV B. However, the club was reprieved after RWDM Brussels was denied a licence for the Challenger Pro League and dropped down the pyramid, a decision which, under the competition's cascading relegation rules, would otherwise have triggered a wave of legal challenges from clubs in the lower divisions, as for instance fellow strugglers at other levels Houtvenne (Belgian Division 1) and Esperanza Pelt (Belgian Division 3) would have been relegated as well. As a result, Sportief Rotselaar retained its place in Division 2 (VV B) for the 2026–27 season.

== Honours ==
- Belgian Third Division
  - Champions (1): 1977–78 (as VC Rotselaar)
- Belgian First Provincial (Flemish Brabant)
  - Champions (1): 2023–24
- Belgian Third Provincial (Flemish Brabant)
  - Champions (1): 2015–16

== Ground ==
Sportief Rotselaar plays its home matches at Sportoase Ter Heide, a multi-purpose sports complex on Torenstraat in Rotselaar, which it has used since 2012.
