= 2024–25 in Belgian football =

Football in Belgium
- Season: 2024–25

Men's football
- Pro League: Union Saint-Gilloise
- Challenger Pro League: Zulte Waregem
- Division 1: VV: Jong KAA Gent; ACFF: Olympic Charleroi
- Division 2: VV A: Roeselare; VV B: Houtevenne; ACFF: Crossing Schaerbeek
- Division 3: VV A: Mandel United; VV B: Londerzeel; ACFF A: Braine; ACFF B: Richelle United
- Cup: Club Brugge
- Super Cup: Union Saint-Gilloise

The following article is a summary of the 2024–25 football season in Belgium, which was the 122nd season of competitive football in the country and ran from July 2024 until June 2025.

== National teams ==
=== Belgium national football team ===
==== Results and fixtures ====
===== UEFA Euro 2024 =====
1 July 2024 Round of 16	France	1–0	Belgium	Düsseldorf, Germany
18:00	Vertonghen 85' (o.g.)	Report		Stadium: Merkur Spiel-Arena; Attendance: 46,810; Referee: Glenn Nyberg (Sweden)

===== UEFA Nations League =====
====== League A Group 2 ======
Pos	Team	Pld	W	D	L	GF	GA	GD	Pts	Qualification or relegation	(France)	(Italy)	(Belgium)	(Israel)
1	France	6	4	1	1	12	6	+6	13 (Note: Tied on head to head results. Overall goal difference: France +6, Italy +5.)	Advance to quarter-finals	—	1–3	2–0	0–0
2	Italy	6	4	1	1	13	8	+5	13	Advance to quarter-finals	1–3	—	2–2	4–1
3	Belgium (O)	6	1	1	4	6	9	−3	4 (Note: Tied on head to head points. Head to head goal difference: Belgium +1, Israel –1.)	Qualification for relegation play-offs	1–2	0–1	—	3–1
4	Israel (R)	6	1	1	4	5	13	−8	4	Relegation to League B	1–4	1–2	1–0	—

Source: UEFA
(O) Play-off winners; (R) Relegated
Notes:

6 September 2024 Group Stage	Belgium	3–1	Israel	Debrecen, Hungary
20:45	De Bruyne 21', 52' (pen.); Tielemans 48'	Report	Castagne 36' (o.g.)	Stadium: Nagyerdei Stadion; Attendance: 0 Referee: Michael Oliver (England)
Note: Match played in Hungary behind closed doors due to security concerns in Israel.

9 September 2024 Group Stage	France	2–0	Belgium	Décines-Charpieu, France
20:45	Kolo Muani 29'; Dembélé 57'	Report		Stadium: Parc Olympique Lyonnais; Attendance: 42,358; Referee: Tobias Stieler (Germany)

10 October 2024 Group Stage	Italy	2–2	Belgium	Rome, Italy
20:45	Cambiaso 1'; Retegui 24'	Report	De Cuyper 42'; Trossard 61'	Stadium: Stadio Olimpico; Attendance: 44,297; Referee: Espen Eskås (Norway)

14 October 2024 Group Stage	Belgium	1–2	France	Brussels, Belgium
20:45	Openda 45+3'	Report	Kolo Muani 35' (pen.), 62'	Stadium: King Baudouin Stadium; Attendance: 39,731; Referee: Irfan Peljto (Bosnia and Herzegovina)

14 November 2024 Group Stage	Belgium	0–1	Italy	Brussels, Belgium
20:45		Report	Tonali 11'	Stadium: King Baudouin Stadium; Attendance: 41,367; Referee: Radu Petrescu (Romania)

17 November 2024 Group Stage	Israel	1–0	Belgium	Budapest, Hungary
20:45	Shua 86'	Report		Stadium: Bozsik Aréna; Attendance: 675; Referee: Sebastian Gishamer (Austria)
Note: Match played in Hungary due to security concerns in Israel.

====== Relegation Play-offs ======
20 March 2025 Play-off Leg 1	Ukraine	3–1	Belgium	Murcia, Spain
20:45	Hutsulyak 66'; Vanat 73'; Zabarnyi 78'	Report	Lukaku 40'	Stadium: Nueva Condomina; Attendance: 8,767; Referee: Sandro Schärer (Switzerland)
Note: Match played in Spain due to the Russian invasion of Ukraine.

23 March 2025 Play-off Leg 2	Belgium	3–0 (4–3 agg.)	Ukraine	Genk, Belgium
20:45	De Cuyper 70'; Lukaku 75', 86'	Report		Stadium: Cegeka Arena; Attendance: 19,446; Referee: Daniel Siebert (Germany)

===== 2026 FIFA World Cup qualification =====
====== Group J ======
Pos	Team	Pld	W	D	L	GF	GA	GD	Pts	Qualification	(Belgium national football team)	(Wales national football team)	(North Macedonia national football team)	(Kazakhstan national football team)	(Liechtenstein national football team)
1	Belgium	8	5	3	0	29	7	+22	18	Qualification for 2026 FIFA World Cup	—	4–3	0–0	6–0	7–0
2	Wales	8	5	1	2	21	11	+10	16	Advance to play-offs	2–4	—	7–1	3–1	3–0
3	North Macedonia	8	3	4	1	13	10	+3	13	Advance to play-offs via Nations League	1–1	1–1	—	1–1	5–0
4	Kazakhstan	8	2	2	4	9	13	−4	8		1–1	0–1	0–1	—	4–0
5	Liechtenstein	8	0	0	8	0	31	−31	0		0–6	0–1	0–3	0–2	—

Source: FIFA, UEFA

6 June 2025 1	North Macedonia	1–1	Belgium	Toše Proeski Arena, Skopje
20:45	Alioski 86'	Report	De Cuyper 28'	Attendance: 23,070; Referee: Chris Kavanagh (England)

9 June 2025 2	Belgium	4–3	Wales	King Baudouin Stadium, Brussels
20:45	Lukaku 15' (pen.); Tielemans 19'; Doku 28'; De Bruyne 88'	Report	Wilson 45+7' (pen.); Thomas 51'; Johnson 70'	Attendance: 33,653; Referee: Irfan Peljto (Bosnia and Herzegovina)

=== Belgium women's national football team ===
==== Results and fixtures ====
===== UEFA Women's Euro 2025 qualifying =====
====== League A Group 2 ======
Pos	Team	Pld	W	D	L	GF	GA	GD	Pts	Qualification	(Spain)	(Denmark)	(Belgium)	(Czech Republic)
1	Spain	6	5	0	1	18	5	+13	15	Qualify for final tournament	—	3–2	2–0	3–1
2	Denmark	6	4	0	2	14	8	+6	12	Qualify for final tournament	0–2	—	4–2	2–0
3	Belgium	6	1	1	4	5	18	−13	4 (Note: Head-to-head points: Belgium 4, Czech Republic 1.)	Advance to play-offs (seeded)	0–7	0–3	—	1–1
4	Czech Republic (R)	6	1	1	4	6	12	−6	4	Advance to play-offs (seeded) and relegation to League B	2–1	1–3	1–2	—

Source: UEFA
Rules for classification: Tiebreakers
(R) Relegated
Notes:

12 July 2024 League Phase	Belgium	0–3	Denmark	Sint-Truiden, Belgium
20:00		Report	Cayman 60' (o.g.); Harder 65'; Holmgaard 82'	Stadium: Stayen; Attendance: 2,764; Referee: Ivana Martinčić (Croatia)

16 July 2024 League Phase	Spain	2–0	Belgium	A Coruña, Spain
19:00	Bonmatí 39'; Abelleira 90+1'	Report		Stadium: Riazor; Attendance: 16,650; Referee: Iuliana Demetrescu (Romania)

====== First round ======
25 October 2024 First leg	Greece	0–0	Belgium	Heraklion, Greece
18:00 (19:00 EEST)		Report		Stadium: Theodoros Vardinogiannis Stadium; Attendance: 1,550; Referee: Ainara Acevedo (Spain)

29 October 2024 Second leg	Belgium	5–0 (5–0 agg.)	Greece	Leuven, Belgium
20:15	Van Kerkhoven 36', 57'; Wullaert 39', 45+4'; Missipo 55'	Report		Stadium: Den Dreef; Attendance: 5,812; Referee: Volha Blotskaya (Belarus)

====== Second round ======
29 November 2024 First leg	Ukraine	0–2	Belgium	Antalya, Turkey
18:00 (20:00 TRT)		Report	Van Kerkhoven 21'; Wullaert 90+3'	Stadium: Mardan Sports Complex; Attendance: 312; Referee: Hristiyana Guteva (Bulgaria)
Note: Match played in Turkey due to the Russian invasion of Ukraine.

3 December 2024 Second leg	Belgium	2–1 (4–1 agg.)	Ukraine	Leuven, Belgium
20:15	Toloba 67'; Wullaert 90'	Report	Shmatko 79'	Stadium: Den Dreef; Attendance: 4,027; Referee: Iuliana Demetrescu (Romania)

===== UEFA Women's Nations League 2025 =====
====== Group 3 ======
Pos	Team	Pld	W	D	L	GF	GA	GD	Pts	Qualification or relegation	(Spain)	(England)	(Belgium)	(Portugal)
1	Spain	6	5	0	1	21	8	+13	15	Qualification for Nations League Finals	—	2–1	3–2	7–1
2	England	6	3	1	2	16	6	+10	10		1–0	—	5–0	6–0
3	Belgium (R)	6	2	0	4	9	16	−7	6	Qualification for relegation play-offs	1–5	3–2	—	0–1
4	Portugal (R)	6	1	1	4	5	21	−16	4	Relegation to League B	2–4	1–1	0–3	—

Source: UEFA
Rules for classification: Tiebreakers
(R) Relegated

21 February 2025 League Phase	Spain	3–2	Belgium	Valencia, Spain
18:45	Pina 77'; García 90+2'; Martín-Prieto 90+6'	Report	Toloba 18'; Wullaert 72'	Stadium: Estadi Ciutat de València; Attendance: 9,369; Referee: Frida Klarlund (Denmark)

26 February 2025 League Phase	Belgium	0–1	Portugal	Leuven, Belgium
20:15		Report	Carole 50'	Stadium: Den Dreef; Attendance: 3,836; Referee: Eleni Antoniou (Greece)

4 April 2025 League Phase	England	5–0	Belgium	Bristol, England
21:00 (20:00 BST)	Bronze 21'; Bright 45+1'; Beever-Jones 67'; Park 78'; Walsh 88'	Report		Stadium: Ashton Gate; Attendance: 23,202; Referee: Marta Huerta de Aza (Spain)

8 April 2025 League Phase	Belgium	3–2	England	Leuven, Belgium
20:30	Wullaert 4', 29'; Vanhaevermaet 16'	Report	Mead 35' (pen.); Agyemang 81'	Stadium: Den Dreef; Attendance: 6,253; Referee: Maria Caputi (Italy)

30 May 2025 League Phase	Belgium	1–5	Spain	Leuven, Belgium
20:30	De Caigny 88'	Report	González 36', 64'; Del Castillo 78', 79'; Redondo 85'	Stadium: Den Dreef; Attendance: 8,054; Referee: Ewa Augustyn (Poland)

3 June 2025 League Phase	Portugal	0–3	Belgium	Funchal, Portugal
19:00 (18:00 UTC+1)		Report	Vanhaevermaet 37'; Wullaert 67' (pen.), 72'	Stadium: Estádio do Marítimo; Attendance: 5,675; Referee: Tess Olofsson (Sweden)

== UEFA competitions ==
=== UEFA Champions League ===
==== Qualifying phase and play-off round ====
Royale Union Saint-Gilloise entered the Champions League in the third qualifying round.

===== Third qualifying round =====
Team 1	Agg.	Team 2	1st leg	2nd leg
Slavia Prague (Czech Republic)	4–1	(Belgium) Union Saint-Gilloise	3–1	1–0

7 August 2024	Slavia Prague (Czech Republic)	3–1	(Belgium) Union Saint-Gilloise	Prague, Czech Republic
19:00	Chorý 19', 41'; Dorley 57'	Report	Bužek 73' (o.g.)	Stadium: Fortuna Arena; Attendance: 18,470; Referee: Tobias Stieler (Germany)

13 August 2024	Union Saint-Gilloise (Belgium)	0–1	(Czech Republic) Slavia Prague	Brussels, Belgium
20:30		Report	Jurečka 84'	Stadium: Constant Vanden Stock Stadium; Attendance: 5,499; Referee: Srđan Jovanović (Serbia)

Slavia Prague won 4–1 on aggregate. Union Saint-Gilloise were transferred to the Europa League play-off round.

==== League phase ====
Club Brugge entered the Champions League in the league phase.

Pos	Team	Pld	W	D	L	GF	GA	GD	Pts	Qualification
22	(The Football Association) Manchester City	8	3	2	3	18	14	+4	11	Advance to knockout phase play-offs (unseeded)
23	(Portuguese Football Federation) Sporting CP	8	3	2	3	13	12	+1	11	Advance to knockout phase play-offs (unseeded)
24	(Royal Belgian Football Association) Club Brugge	8	3	2	3	7	11	−4	11	Advance to knockout phase play-offs (unseeded)
25	(Croatian Football Federation) Dinamo Zagreb	8	3	2	3	12	19	−7	11	
26	(German Football Association) VfB Stuttgart	8	3	1	4	13	17	−4	10	

Source: UEFA
Rules for classification: League phase tiebreakers

18 September 2024	Club Brugge (Belgium)	0–3	(Germany) Borussia Dortmund	Bruges, Belgium
21:00		Report	Gittens 76', 86'; Guirassy 90+5' (pen.)	Stadium: Jan Breydel Stadium; Attendance: 19,961; Referee: Irfan Peljto (Bosnia and Herzegovina)

2 October 2024	Sturm Graz (Austria)	0–1	(Belgium) Club Brugge	Klagenfurt, Austria
21:00		Report	Tzolis 23'	Stadium: Wörthersee Stadion; Attendance: 23,205; Referee: Aliyar Aghayev (Azerbaijan)
Note: Sturm Graz played their home European matches at Wörthersee Stadion, Klagenfurt, instead of their regular stadium, Merkur Arena, Graz, which did not meet UEFA requirements.

22 October 2024	Milan (Italy)	3–1	(Belgium) Club Brugge	Milan, Italy
18:45	Pulisic 34'; Reijnders 61', 71'	Report	Sabbe 51'	Stadium: San Siro; Attendance: 58,649; Referee: Felix Zwayer (Germany)

6 November 2024	Club Brugge (Belgium)	1–0	(England) Aston Villa	Bruges, Belgium
18:45	Vanaken 52' (pen.)	Report		Stadium: Jan Breydel Stadium; Attendance: 23,466; Referee: Tobias Stieler (Germany)

27 November 2024	Celtic (Scotland)	1–1	(Belgium) Club Brugge	Glasgow, Scotland
21:00 (20:00 GMT)	Maeda 60'	Report	Carter-Vickers 26' (o.g.)	Stadium: Celtic Park; Attendance: 57,456; Referee: Georgi Kabakov (Bulgaria)

10 December 2024	Club Brugge (Belgium)	2–1	(Portugal) Sporting CP	Bruges, Belgium
21:00	Quaresma 24' (o.g.); Nielsen 84'	Report	Catamo 3'	Stadium: Jan Breydel Stadium; Attendance: 22,254; Referee: Anthony Taylor (England)

21 January 2025	Club Brugge (Belgium)	0–0	(Italy) Juventus	Bruges, Belgium
21:00		Report		Stadium: Jan Breydel Stadium; Attendance: 26,700; Referee: Benoît Bastien (France)

29 January 2025	Manchester City (England)	3–1	(Belgium) Club Brugge	Manchester, England
21:00 (20:00 GMT)	Kovačić 53'; Ordóñez 62' (o.g.); Savinho 77'	Report	Onyedika 45'	Stadium: City of Manchester Stadium; Attendance: 51,237; Referee: José María Sánchez Martínez (Spain)

Club Brugge finished 24th in the league phase and qualified for the knockout phase play-offs.

==== Knockout phase ====
===== Knockout phase play-offs =====
Team 1	Agg.	Team 2	1st leg	2nd leg
Club Brugge (Belgium)	5–2	(Italy) Atalanta	2–1	3–1

12 February 2025	Club Brugge (Belgium)	2–1	(Italy) Atalanta	Bruges, Belgium
18:45	Jutglà 15'; Nilsson 90+4' (pen.)	Report	Pašalić 41'	Stadium: Jan Breydel Stadium; Attendance: 24,242; Referee: Halil Umut Meler (Turkey)

18 February 2025	Atalanta (Italy)	1–3	(Belgium) Club Brugge	Bergamo, Italy
21:00	Lookman 46'	Report	Talbi 3', 27'; Jutglà 45+3'	Stadium: Gewiss Stadium; Attendance: 21,727; Referee: Felix Zwayer (Germany)

Club Brugge won 5–2 on aggregate and advanced to the round of 16.

===== Round of 16 =====
Team 1	Agg.	Team 2	1st leg	2nd leg
Club Brugge (Belgium)	1–6	(England) Aston Villa	1–3	0–3

4 March 2025	Club Brugge (Belgium)	1–3	(England) Aston Villa	Bruges, Belgium
18:45	De Cuyper 12'	Report	Bailey 3'; Mechele 82' (o.g.); Asensio 88' (pen.)	Stadium: Jan Breydel Stadium; Attendance: 26,890; Referee: João Pinheiro (Portugal)

12 March 2025	Aston Villa (England)	3–0	(Belgium) Club Brugge	Birmingham, England
21:00 (20:00 GMT)	Asensio 50', 61'; Maatsen 57'	Report		Stadium: Villa Park; Attendance: 42,461; Referee: Daniel Siebert (Germany)

Aston Villa won 6–1 on aggregate. Club Brugge were eliminated.

=== UEFA Europa League ===
Belgian clubs participating in the 2024–25 UEFA Europa League:

- Union Saint-Gilloise (entered league phase after elimination from Champions League third qualifying round)
- Anderlecht (entered play-off round)
- Cercle Brugge (entered second qualifying round)

==== Qualifying phase and play-off round ====
===== Second qualifying round =====
Cercle Brugge entered in the second qualifying round.

Team 1	Agg.	Team 2	1st leg	2nd leg
Kilmarnock (Scotland)	1–2	(Belgium) Cercle Brugge	1–1	0–1

25 July 2024	Kilmarnock (Scotland)	1–1	(Belgium) Cercle Brugge	Kilmarnock, Scotland
20:30 (19:30 BST)	Watson 70'	Report	Olaigbe 55'	Stadium: Rugby Park; Attendance: 10,410; Referee: Martin Dohal (Slovakia)

1 August 2024	Cercle Brugge (Belgium)	1–0	(Scotland) Kilmarnock	Bruges, Belgium
20:00	Somers 21'	Report		Stadium: Jan Breydel Stadium; Attendance: 10,230; Referee: Ante Čulina (Croatia)

Cercle Brugge won 2–1 on aggregate and advanced to the third qualifying round.

===== Third qualifying round =====
Team 1	Agg.	Team 2	1st leg	2nd leg
Molde (Norway)	3–1	(Belgium) Cercle Brugge	3–0	0–1

8 August 2024	Molde (Norway)	3–0	(Belgium) Cercle Brugge	Molde, Norway
19:00	Eriksen 3'; Eikrem 18'; Linnes 30'	Report		Stadium: Aker Stadion; Attendance: 4,200; Referee: Luís Godinho (Portugal)

15 August 2024	Cercle Brugge (Belgium)	1–0	(Norway) Molde	Bruges, Belgium
20:00	Ouattara 41'	Report		Stadium: Jan Breydel Stadium; Attendance: 4,504; Referee: Balázs Berke (Hungary)

Molde won 3–1 on aggregate. Cercle Brugge were eliminated from European competition.

===== Play-off round =====
Anderlecht entered in the play-off round.

Team 1	Agg.	Team 2	1st leg	2nd leg
Dinamo Minsk (Belarus)	0–2	(Belgium) Anderlecht	0–1	0–1

22 August 2024	Dinamo Minsk (Belarus)	0–1	(Belgium) Anderlecht	Mezőkövesd, Hungary
20:45		Report	Augustinsson 9'	Stadium: Mezőkövesdi Városi Stadion; Attendance: 0 Referee: Rohit Saggi (Norway)
Note: Match played at Mezőkövesdi Városi Stadion, Mezőkövesd (Hungary), as Belarusian clubs are not permitted to host UEFA competition matches in their home country due to Belarus's involvement in the Russian invasion of Ukraine. The match was played behind closed doors.

29 August 2024	Anderlecht (Belgium)	1–0	(Belarus) Dinamo Minsk	Brussels, Belgium
20:00	Amuzu 84'	Report		Stadium: Constant Vanden Stock Stadium; Attendance: 17,102; Referee: Nikola Dabanović (Montenegro)

Anderlecht won 2–0 on aggregate and advanced to the league phase.

==== League phase ====
Union Saint-Gilloise and Anderlecht participated in the league phase.

===== Union Saint-Gilloise =====
Pos	Team	Pld	W	D	L	GF	GA	GD	Pts	Qualification
19	(Royal Dutch Football Association) AZ	8	3	2	3	13	13	0	11	Advance to knockout phase play-offs (unseeded)
20	(Danish Football Association) Midtjylland	8	3	2	3	9	9	0	11	Advance to knockout phase play-offs (unseeded)
21	(Royal Belgian Football Association) Union Saint-Gilloise	8	3	2	3	8	8	0	11	Advance to knockout phase play-offs (unseeded)
22	(Hellenic Football Federation) PAOK	8	3	1	4	12	10	+2	10	Advance to knockout phase play-offs (unseeded)
23	(Royal Dutch Football Association) Twente	8	2	4	2	8	9	−1	10	Advance to knockout phase play-offs (unseeded)

Source: UEFA
Rules for classification: League phase tiebreakers

26 September 2024	Fenerbahçe (Turkey)	2–1	(Belgium) Union Saint-Gilloise	Istanbul, Turkey
18:45 (19:45 TRT)	Söyüncü 26'; Burgess 82' (o.g.)	Report	Sykes 90+3'	Stadium: Şükrü Saracoğlu Stadium; Attendance: 31,760; Referee: Benoît Bastien (France)

3 October 2024	Union Saint-Gilloise (Belgium)	0–0	(Norway) Bodø/Glimt	Brussels, Belgium
21:00		Report		Stadium: King Baudouin Stadium; Attendance: 5,576; Referee: Ondřej Berka (Czech Republic)
Note: Union Saint-Gilloise played their home European matches at King Baudouin Stadium, Brussels, instead of their regular stadium, Joseph Marien Stadium, Brussels, which did not meet UEFA requirements.

24 October 2024	Midtjylland (Denmark)	1–0	(Belgium) Union Saint-Gilloise	Herning, Denmark
18:45	Diao 18'	Report		Stadium: MCH Arena; Attendance: 8,491; Referee: Sebastian Gishamer (Austria)

7 November 2024	Union Saint-Gilloise (Belgium)	1–1	(Italy) Roma	Brussels, Belgium
18:45	Mac Allister 77'	Report	Mancini 62'	Stadium: King Baudouin Stadium; Attendance: 13,875; Referee: Jérôme Brisard (France)
Note: Union Saint-Gilloise played their home European matches at King Baudouin Stadium, Brussels.

28 November 2024	Twente (Netherlands)	0–1	(Belgium) Union Saint-Gilloise	Enschede, Netherlands
21:00		Report	Fuseini 11'	Stadium: De Grolsch Veste; Attendance: 26,500; Referee: John Beaton (Scotland)

12 December 2024	Union Saint-Gilloise (Belgium)	2–1	(France) Nice	Brussels, Belgium
18:45	Ivanović 33', 90+2'	Report	Guessand 45+1'	Stadium: King Baudouin Stadium; Attendance: 7,501; Referee: Chris Kavanagh (England)
Note: Union Saint-Gilloise played their home European matches at King Baudouin Stadium, Brussels.

23 January 2025	Union Saint-Gilloise (Belgium)	2–1	(Portugal) Braga	Brussels, Belgium
21:00	Ivanović 50', 74'	Report	El Ouazzani 16'	Stadium: King Baudouin Stadium; Attendance: 7,729; Referee: Nick Walsh (Scotland)
Note: Union Saint-Gilloise played their home European matches at King Baudouin Stadium, Brussels.

30 January 2025	Rangers (Scotland)	2–1	(Belgium) Union Saint-Gilloise	Glasgow, Scotland
21:00 (20:00 GMT)	Raskin 21'; Černý 55'	Report	Mac Allister 83'	Stadium: Ibrox Stadium; Attendance: 46,993; Referee: Damian Sylwestrzak (Poland)

Union Saint-Gilloise finished 21st in the league phase and qualified for the knockout phase play-offs.

===== Anderlecht =====
Pos	Team	Pld	W	D	L	GF	GA	GD	Pts	Qualification
8	(Scottish Football Association) Rangers	8	4	2	2	16	10	+6	14	Advance to round of 16 (seeded)
9	(Norwegian Football Federation) Bodø/Glimt	8	4	2	2	14	11	+3	14	Advance to knockout phase play-offs (seeded)
10	(Royal Belgian Football Association) Anderlecht	8	4	2	2	14	12	+2	14	Advance to knockout phase play-offs (seeded)
11	(Romanian Football Federation) FCSB	8	4	2	2	10	9	+1	14	Advance to knockout phase play-offs (seeded)
12	(Royal Dutch Football Association) Ajax	8	4	1	3	16	8	+8	13	Advance to knockout phase play-offs (seeded)

Source: UEFA
Rules for classification: League phase tiebreakers

25 September 2024	Anderlecht (Belgium)	2–1	(Hungary) Ferencváros	Brussels, Belgium
21:00	Verschaeren 61'; Dolberg 66' (pen.)	Report	Traoré 86'	Stadium: Constant Vanden Stock Stadium; Attendance: 15,417; Referee: Julian Weinberger (Austria)

3 October 2024	Real Sociedad (Spain)	1–2	(Belgium) Anderlecht	San Sebastián, Spain
18:45	Marín 5'	Report	Vázquez 28'; Leoni 39'	Stadium: Anoeta; Attendance: 30,985; Referee: Marian Barbu (Romania)

24 October 2024	Anderlecht (Belgium)	2–0	(Bulgaria) Ludogorets Razgrad	Brussels, Belgium
21:00	Edozie 67'; Dreyer 90+5'	Report		Stadium: Constant Vanden Stock Stadium; Attendance: 18,000; Referee: Filip Glova (Slovakia)

7 November 2024	RFS (Latvia)	1–1	(Belgium) Anderlecht	Riga, Latvia
21:00 (22:00 EET)	Ndiaye 90+6' (o.g.)	Report	Stroeykens 85'	Stadium: Daugava Stadium; Attendance: 4,820; Referee: Aleksandar Stavrev (North Macedonia)
Note: RFS played their home European matches at Daugava Stadium, Riga, instead of their regular stadium, LNK Sporta Parks, Riga, which did not meet UEFA requirements.

28 November 2024	Anderlecht (Belgium)	2–2	(Portugal) Porto	Brussels, Belgium
18:45	Degreef 52'; Amuzu 86'	Report	Galeno 24' (pen.); Vieira 83'	Stadium: Constant Vanden Stock Stadium; Attendance: 17,717; Referee: Morten Krogh (Denmark)

12 December 2024	Slavia Prague (Czech Republic)	1–2	(Belgium) Anderlecht	Prague, Czech Republic
21:00	Chorý 58'	Report	Angulo 8'; Verschaeren 31'	Stadium: Fortuna Arena; Attendance: 19,167; Referee: Anastasios Papapetrou (Greece)

23 January 2025	Viktoria Plzeň (Czech Republic)	2–0	(Belgium) Anderlecht	Plzeň, Czech Republic
18:45	Červ 3'; Adu 45'	Report		Stadium: Doosan Arena; Attendance: 10,972; Referee: António Nobre (Portugal)

30 January 2025	Anderlecht (Belgium)	3–4	(Germany) TSG Hoffenheim	Brussels, Belgium
21:00	Vázquez 18'; Goto 79'; Augustinsson 88'	Report	Sardella 41' (o.g.); Bischof 54'; Mokwa 59'; Hložek 65'	Stadium: Constant Vanden Stock Stadium; Attendance: 17,839; Referee: Giorgi Kruashvili (Georgia)

Anderlecht finished 10th in the league phase and qualified for the knockout phase play-offs.

==== Knockout phase ====
===== Knockout phase play-offs =====
====== Union Saint-Gilloise ======
Team 1	Agg.	Team 2	1st leg	2nd leg
Union Saint-Gilloise (Belgium)	2–3	(Netherlands) Ajax	0–2	2–1

13 February 2025	Union Saint-Gilloise (Belgium)	0–2	(Netherlands) Ajax	Brussels, Belgium
18:45		Report	Rasmussen 59'; Mokio 71'	Stadium: King Baudouin Stadium; Attendance: 10,853; Referee: Donatas Rumšas (Lithuania)
Note: Union Saint-Gilloise played their home European matches at King Baudouin Stadium, Brussels.

20 February 2025	Ajax (Netherlands)	1–2 (a.e.t.)	(Belgium) Union Saint-Gilloise	Amsterdam, Netherlands
21:00	Taylor 93' (pen.)	Report	Mac Allister 16'; David 28' (pen.)	Stadium: Johan Cruyff Arena; Attendance: 51,835; Referee: Chris Kavanagh (England)

Ajax won 3–2 on aggregate after extra time. Union Saint-Gilloise were eliminated.

====== Anderlecht ======
Team 1	Agg.	Team 2	1st leg	2nd leg
Fenerbahçe (Turkey)	5–2	(Belgium) Anderlecht	3–0	2–2

13 February 2025	Fenerbahçe (Turkey)	3–0	(Belgium) Anderlecht	Istanbul, Turkey
18:45 (20:45 TRT)	Tadić 11'; Džeko 42'; En-Nesyri 57'	Report		Stadium: Şükrü Saracoğlu Stadium; Attendance: 34,517; Referee: Nikola Dabanović (Montenegro)

20 February 2025	Anderlecht (Belgium)	2–2	(Turkey) Fenerbahçe	Brussels, Belgium
21:00	Vázquez 19', 55'	Report	En-Nesyri 4'; Akçiçek 63'	Stadium: Constant Vanden Stock Stadium; Attendance: 13,724; Referee: Sandro Schärer (Switzerland)

Fenerbahçe won 5–2 on aggregate. Anderlecht were eliminated.

=== UEFA Conference League ===
Belgian clubs participating in the 2024–25 UEFA Conference League:

- Gent (entered second qualifying round)
- Cercle Brugge (entered play-off round after elimination from Europa League third qualifying round)

==== Qualifying phase and play-off round ====
===== Second qualifying round =====
Gent entered in the second qualifying round.

Team 1	Agg.	Team 2	1st leg	2nd leg
Gent (Belgium)	7–1	(Faroe Islands) Víkingur Gøta	4–1	3–0

25 July 2024	Gent (Belgium)	4–1	(Faroe Islands) Víkingur Gøta	Ghent, Belgium
20:00	Hong Hyun-seok 25', 88'; Kums 59'; De Sart 68' (pen.)	Report	Nielsen 13'	Stadium: Planet Group Arena; Attendance: 7,821; Referee: Vilhjalmur Thorarinsson (Iceland)

1 August 2024	Víkingur Gøta (Faroe Islands)	0–3	(Belgium) Gent	Klaksvík, Faroe Islands
19:45 (18:45 WEST)		Report	Mitrović 64'; Fernandez-Pardo 69'; Dean 76' (pen.)	Stadium: Við Djúpumýrar; Attendance: 428; Referee: Mihály Káprály (Hungary)
Note: Match played at Við Djúpumýrar, Klaksvík, as Víkingur Gøta's regular stadium, Sarpugerði, Norðragøta, did not meet UEFA requirements.

Gent won 7–1 on aggregate and advanced to the third qualifying round.

===== Third qualifying round =====
(a.e.t.)

Team 1	Agg.	Team 2	1st leg	2nd leg
Silkeborg (Denmark)	4–5	(Belgium) Gent	2–2	2–3

8 August 2024	Silkeborg (Denmark)	2–2	(Belgium) Gent	Silkeborg, Denmark
18:30	Adamsen 49' (pen.), 90+5'	Report	Ganchas 61' (o.g.); Dean 90+3'	Stadium: JYSK Park; Attendance: 3,712; Referee: Christian-Petru Ciochirca (Austria)

15 August 2024	Gent (Belgium)	3–2 (a.e.t.)	(Denmark) Silkeborg	Ghent, Belgium
20:30	Dean 38'; Gandelman 90+3', 118'	Report	Adamsen 33', 51' (pen.)	Stadium: Planet Group Arena; Attendance: 8,769; Referee: José Luis Munuera Montero (Spain)

Gent won 5–4 on aggregate after extra time and advanced to the play-off round.

===== Play-off round =====
====== Cercle Brugge ======
Cercle Brugge entered the Conference League play-off round after being eliminated from the UEFA Europa League third qualifying round.

Team 1	Agg.	Team 2	1st leg	2nd leg
Wisła Kraków (Poland)	5–7	(Belgium) Cercle Brugge	1–6	4–1

22 August 2024	Wisła Kraków (Poland)	1–6	(Belgium) Cercle Brugge	Kraków, Poland
20:30	Rodado 85'	Report	Minda 8'; Somers 10'; Ravych 36'; Denkey 47'; Ouattara 56'; Olaigbe 83'	Stadium: Henryk Reyman Stadium; Attendance: 25,093; Referee: Philip Farrugia (Malta)

29 August 2024	Cercle Brugge (Belgium)	1–4	(Poland) Wisła Kraków	Bruges, Belgium
20:00	Felipe Augusto 77'	Report	Uryga 15'; Kiss 18'; Gogół 73'; Zwoliński 90+4'	Stadium: Jan Breydel Stadium; Attendance: 5,654; Referee: Horațiu Feșnic (Romania)

Cercle Brugge won 7–5 on aggregate and advanced to the league phase.

====== Gent ======
Team 1	Agg.	Team 2	1st leg	2nd leg
Partizan (Serbia)	0–2	(Belgium) Gent	0–1	0–1

22 August 2024	Partizan (Serbia)	0–1	(Belgium) Gent	Belgrade, Serbia
20:15		Report	Gandelman 16'	Stadium: Partizan Stadium; Attendance: 0 Referee: Elchin Masiyev (Azerbaijan)
Note: Match played behind closed doors due to UEFA sanctions against Partizan for racist behaviour of their fans.

28 August 2024	Gent (Belgium)	1–0	(Serbia) Partizan	Ghent, Belgium
18:00	Delorge 88'	Report		Stadium: Planet Group Arena; Attendance: 10,437; Referee: Filip Glova (Slovakia)

Gent won 2–0 on aggregate and advanced to the league phase.

==== League phase ====
Cercle Brugge and Gent participated in the league phase.

===== Cercle Brugge =====
Pos	Team	Pld	W	D	L	GF	GA	GD	Pts	Qualification
6	(Swiss Football Association) Lugano	6	4	1	1	11	7	+4	13 (Note: Away goals scored: Djurgårdens IF 5, Lugano 4.)	Advance to round of 16 (seeded)
7	(Polish Football Association) Legia Warsaw	6	4	0	2	13	5	+8	12	Advance to round of 16 (seeded)
8	(Royal Belgian Football Association) Cercle Brugge	6	3	2	1	14	7	+7	11	Advance to round of 16 (seeded)
9	(Polish Football Association) Jagiellonia Białystok	6	3	2	1	10	5	+5	11	Advance to knockout phase play-offs (seeded)
10	(Football Association of Ireland) Shamrock Rovers	6	3	2	1	12	9	+3	11	Advance to knockout phase play-offs (seeded)

Source: UEFA
Rules for classification: League phase tiebreakers
Notes:

3 October 2024	Cercle Brugge (Belgium)	6–2	(Switzerland) St. Gallen	Bruges, Belgium
18:45	Minda 3'; Denkey 25', 43', 54' (pen.); Magnée 63', 68'	Report	Csoboth 58'; Mambimbi 81'	Stadium: Jan Breydel Stadium; Attendance: 5,195; Referee: Arda Kardeşler (Turkey)

24 October 2024	Víkingur Reykjavík (Iceland)	3–1	(Belgium) Cercle Brugge	Kópavogur, Iceland
16:30 (14:30 GMT)	Sigurpálsson 17'; Djuric 76'; Vatnhamar 83'	Report	Olaigbe 16'	Stadium: Kópavogsvöllur; Attendance: 1,200; Referee: Vitālijs Spasjoņņikovs (Latvia)
Note: Match kick-off time changed from 18:45 CEST (16:45 UTC+0) to 16:30 CEST (14:30 UTC+0) due to lack of floodlights at Kópavogsvöllur. Match played at Kópavogsvöllur, Kópavogur, as Víkingur Reykjavík's regular stadium, Víkingsvöllur, Reykjavík, did not meet UEFA requirements.

7 November 2024	LASK (Austria)	0–0	(Belgium) Cercle Brugge	Linz, Austria
21:00		Report		Stadium: Raiffeisen Arena; Attendance: 8,500; Referee: Radoslav Gidzhenov (Bulgaria)

28 November 2024	Cercle Brugge (Belgium)	2–0	(Scotland) Heart of Midlothian	Bruges, Belgium
18:45	Efekele 40'; Magnée 90'	Report		Stadium: Jan Breydel Stadium; Attendance: 7,722; Referee: Elchin Masiyev (Azerbaijan)

12 December 2024	Olimpija Ljubljana (Slovenia)	1–4	(Belgium) Cercle Brugge	Ljubljana, Slovenia
18:45	Blanco 5'	Report	Olaigbe 2', 81'; Felipe Augusto 24'; Denkey 72'	Stadium: Stožice Stadium; Attendance: 5,646; Referee: Adam Ladebäck (Sweden)

19 December 2024	Cercle Brugge (Belgium)	1–1	(Turkey) İstanbul Başakşehir	Bruges, Belgium
21:00	Brunner 82'	Report	Piątek 74'	Stadium: Jan Breydel Stadium; Attendance: 4,411; Referee: István Vad (Hungary)

Cercle Brugge finished 8th in the league phase and qualified for the Round of 16.

===== Gent =====
Pos	Team	Pld	W	D	L	GF	GA	GD	Pts	Qualification
15	(Royal Spanish Football Federation) Real Betis	6	3	1	2	6	5	+1	10	Advance to knockout phase play-offs (seeded)
16	(German Football Association) 1. FC Heidenheim	6	3	1	2	7	7	0	10	Advance to knockout phase play-offs (seeded)
17	(Royal Belgian Football Association) Gent	6	3	0	3	8	8	0	9	Advance to knockout phase play-offs (unseeded)
18	(Danish Football Association) Copenhagen	6	2	2	2	8	9	−1	8	Advance to knockout phase play-offs (unseeded)
19	(Football Association of Iceland) Víkingur Reykjavík	6	2	2	2	7	8	−1	8	Advance to knockout phase play-offs (unseeded)

Source: UEFA
Rules for classification: League phase tiebreakers

3 October 2024	Chelsea (England)	4–2	(Belgium) Gent	London, England
21:00 (20:00 BST)	Veiga 12'; Neto 46'; Nkunku 63'; Dewsbury-Hall 70'	Report	Watanabe 50'; Gandelman 90'	Stadium: Stamford Bridge; Attendance: 38,546; Referee: Daniel Schlager (Germany)

24 October 2024	Gent (Belgium)	2–1	(Norway) Molde	Ghent, Belgium
18:45	Fadiga 24'; Brown 90+5'	Report	Dæhli 78'	Stadium: Planet Group Arena; Attendance: 8,027; Referee: Goga Kikacheishvili (Georgia)

7 November 2024	Gent (Belgium)	1–0	(Cyprus) Omonia	Ghent, Belgium
18:45	Gandelman 31'	Report		Stadium: Planet Group Arena; Attendance: 8,584; Referee: Tamás Bognár (Hungary)

28 November 2024	Lugano (Switzerland)	2–0	(Belgium) Gent	Thun, Switzerland
21:00	Mahou 6'; Doumbia 86'	Report		Stadium: Stockhorn Arena; Attendance: 2,672; Referee: Enea Jorgji (Albania)
Note: Match played at Stockhorn Arena, Thun, as Lugano's regular stadium, Cornaredo Stadium, Lugano, did not meet UEFA requirements.

12 December 2024	Gent (Belgium)	3–0	(Serbia) TSC	Ghent, Belgium
21:00	Dean 8' (pen.); Gandelman 13'; Surdez 20'	Report		Stadium: Planet Group Arena; Attendance: 5,423; Referee: Ashot Ghaltakhchyan (Armenia)

19 December 2024	Larne (Northern Ireland)	1–0	(Belgium) Gent	Belfast, Northern Ireland
21:00 (20:00 GMT)	Cosgrove 74'	Report		Stadium: Windsor Park; Attendance: 2,393; Referee: Sigurd Kringstad (Norway)
Note: Larne played their home European matches at Windsor Park, Belfast, instead of their regular stadium, Inver Park, Larne, which did not meet UEFA requirements.

Gent finished 17th in the league phase and qualified for the knockout phase play-offs.

==== Knockout phase ====
===== Knockout phase play-offs =====
Gent participated in the knockout phase play-offs.

Team 1	Agg.	Team 2	1st leg	2nd leg
Gent (Belgium)	1–3	(Spain) Real Betis	0–3	1–0

13 February 2025	Gent (Belgium)	0–3	(Spain) Real Betis	Ghent, Belgium
21:00		Report	Antony 47'; Bakambu 72'; Altimira 84'	Stadium: Planet Group Arena; Attendance: 11,051; Referee: Horațiu Feșnic (Romania)

20 February 2025	Real Betis (Spain)	0–1	(Belgium) Gent	Seville, Spain
18:45		Report	Brown 87'	Stadium: Benito Villamarín; Attendance: 51,510; Referee: Damian Sylwestrzak (Poland)

Real Betis won 3–1 on aggregate. Gent were eliminated.

===== Round of 16 =====
Cercle Brugge participated in the round of 16.

Team 1	Agg.	Team 2	1st leg	2nd leg
Jagiellonia Białystok (Poland)	3–2	(Belgium) Cercle Brugge	3–0	0–2

6 March 2025	Jagiellonia Białystok (Poland)	3–0	(Belgium) Cercle Brugge	Białystok, Poland
21:00	Pululu 69' (pen.), 78'; Romanczuk 75'	Report		Stadium: Białystok City Stadium; Attendance: 17,221; Referee: Anastasios Sidiropoulos (Greece)

13 March 2025	Cercle Brugge (Belgium)	2–0	(Poland) Jagiellonia Białystok	Bruges, Belgium
18:45	Van der Bruggen 8'; Felipe Augusto 50'	Report		Stadium: Jan Breydel Stadium; Attendance: 4,646; Referee: Morten Krogh (Denmark)

Jagiellonia Białystok won 3–2 on aggregate. Cercle Brugge were eliminated.

=== UEFA Youth League ===
Belgian clubs participating in the 2024–25 UEFA Youth League:

- Club Brugge (UEFA Champions League Path)
- Genk (Domestic Champions Path)

==== League stage (Champions League Path) ====
Club Brugge participated in the Champions League Path.

Pos	Team	Pld	W	D	L	GF	GA	GD	Pts
29	(Royal Dutch Football Association) Feyenoord	6	1	1	4	7	14	−7	4
30	(Swiss Football Association) Young Boys	6	1	0	5	11	17	−6	3
31	(Royal Belgian Football Association) Club Brugge	6	0	3	3	5	11	−6	3
32	(German Football Association) RB Leipzig	6	1	0	5	10	18	−8	3
33	(Italian Football Federation) Bologna	6	0	2	4	7	14	−7	2

Source: UEFA
Rules for classification: League phase tiebreakers

18 September 2024	Club Brugge (Belgium)	1–1	(Germany) Borussia Dortmund	Roeselare, Belgium
15:30	Granados 43'	Report	Wätjen 90'	Stadium: Schiervelde Stadion; Attendance: 950; Referee: Heini Ziskason Viðoy (Faroe Islands)

2 October 2024	Sturm Graz (Austria)	1–1	(Belgium) Club Brugge	St. Veit an der Glan, Austria
16:00	Grgic 29'	Report	Furo 77'	Stadium: Jacques Lemans Arena; Attendance: 354; Referee: Antoine Chiaramonti (Andorra)

22 October 2024	Milan (Italy)	1–1	(Belgium) Club Brugge	Milan, Italy
14:00	Ossola 90+5'	Report	Furo 41'	Stadium: Centro Sportivo Vismara; Attendance: 382; Referee: Joonas Jaanovits (Estonia)

6 November 2024	Club Brugge (Belgium)	2–6	(England) Aston Villa	Roeselare, Belgium
13:30	Da Silva 6'; Granados 31' (pen.)	Report	Burrowes 25'; Broggio 39' (pen.); Vandeperre 44' (o.g.); Jimoh-Aloba 72'; Cotcher 74', 80'	Stadium: Schiervelde Stadion; Attendance: 750; Referee: Bence Csonka (Hungary)

27 November 2024	Celtic (Scotland)	1–0	(Belgium) Club Brugge	Glasgow, Scotland
14:00 (13:00 GMT)	Cummings 8'	Report		Stadium: Lesser Hampden; Attendance: 364; Referee: Jamie Robinson (Northern Ireland)

10 December 2024	Club Brugge (Belgium)	0–1	(Portugal) Sporting CP	Roeselare, Belgium
15:30		Report	Amengai 17' (o.g.)	Stadium: Schiervelde Stadion; Attendance: 336; Referee: Lukasz Kuzma (Poland)

Club Brugge finished 31st in the league phase and were eliminated.

==== Domestic Champions Path ====
Genk participated in the Domestic Champions Path.

===== Second round =====
Team 1	Agg.	Team 2	1st leg	2nd leg
Genk (Belgium)	6–2	(Bulgaria) CSKA Sofia	3–1	3–1

22 October 2024	Genk (Belgium)	3–1	(Bulgaria) CSKA Sofia	Genk, Belgium
18:00	Toure 33'; Camara 81'; Decresson 88' (pen.)	Report	Panayotov 3'	Stadium: Cegeka Arena - Stadium B Attendance: 435; Referee: Igor Stojchevski (North Macedonia)

6 November 2024	CSKA Sofia (Bulgaria)	1–3	(Belgium) Genk	Sofia, Bulgaria
15:00 (16:00 EET)	Nikolov 59' (pen.)	Report	Haroun 21'; De Wannemacker 42'; Evtov 50' (o.g.)	Stadium: Vasil Levski National Stadium; Attendance: 603; Referee: Bulat Sariyev (Kazakhstan)

Genk won 6–2 on aggregate and advanced to the third round.

===== Third round =====
Team 1	Agg.	Team 2	1st leg	2nd leg
Puskás Akadémia (Hungary)	2–2 (6–5 p)	(Belgium) Genk	1–0	1–2

27 November 2024	Puskás Akadémia (Hungary)	1–0	(Belgium) Genk	Felcsút, Hungary
16:00	Mondovics 27' (pen.)	Report		Stadium: Pancho Aréna; Attendance: 473; Referee: Kevin O'Sullivan (Republic of Ireland)

17 December 2024	Genk (Belgium)	2–1 (a.e.t.)	(Hungary) Puskás Akadémia	Genk, Belgium
18:00	De Wannemacker 45', 62' (pen.)	Report	Vékony 72'	Stadium: Cegeka Arena - Stadium B Attendance: 467; Referee: Pavle Ilić (Serbia)
	Penalties
	Decresson (penalty scored); Cauwel (penalty scored); Tran (penalty scored); De Wannemacker (penalty scored); Kapers (penalty scored); Rabhi (penalty missed)		Markgráf (penalty scored); Dymitriev (penalty scored); Pál (penalty scored); Umathum (penalty scored); Mondovics (penalty scored); Varga (penalty scored)

2–2 on aggregate. Puskás Akadémia won 6–5 on penalties. Genk were eliminated from the competition.

=== UEFA Women's Champions League ===
Anderlecht Women participated in the 2024–25 UEFA Women's Champions League.

==== Qualifying rounds ====
===== Round 1 =====
Anderlecht participated in Tournament 4, hosted in Ta' Qali, Malta.

====== Semi-finals ======
Team 1	Score	Team 2
Anderlecht (Belgium)	4–1	(Serbia) Crvena Zvezda

4 September 2024	Anderlecht (Belgium)	4–1	(Serbia) Crvena Zvezda	Ta' Qali, Malta
17:45	Vătafu 6'; Deloose 19'; Delabre 58'; Vanzeir 74'	Report	Matejić 90+5'	Stadium: Centenary Stadium; Attendance: 62; Referee: Sofik Torosyan (Armenia)

====== Final ======
Team 1	Score	Team 2
Anderlecht (Belgium)	5–0	(Malta) Birkirkara

7 September 2024	Anderlecht (Belgium)	5–0	(Malta) Birkirkara	Ta' Qali, Malta
21:15	Delabre 16'; Minnaert 51'; Vanzeir 53'; Bennink 90+3'; Teinturier 90+5'	Report		Stadium: Centenary Stadium; Attendance: 265; Referee: Tatyana Sorokopudova (Kazakhstan)

Anderlecht won Tournament 4 and advanced to Round 2 (Champions Path).

===== Round 2 =====
====== Champions Path ======
Team 1	Agg.	Team 2	1st leg	2nd leg
Anderlecht (Belgium)	1–5	(Norway) Vålerenga	1–2	0–3

18 September 2024	Anderlecht (Belgium)	1–2	(Norway) Vålerenga	Brussels, Belgium
19:30	Vătafu 29'	Report	Michaela Dominique Kovacs 14'; Sævik 16'	Stadium: King Baudouin Stadium; Attendance: 351; Referee: Deborah Bianchi (Italy)

25 September 2024	Vålerenga (Norway)	3–0	(Belgium) Anderlecht	Oslo, Norway
18:30	Bjelde 70'; Thomsen 75'; Sævik 81'	Report		Stadium: Intility Arena; Attendance: 2,129; Referee: Alina Peşu (Romania)

Vålerenga won 5–1 on aggregate. Anderlecht were eliminated and did not qualify for the group stage.

== Men's football ==
=== Pro League ===
==== Regular season ====
Pos	Team	Pld	W	D	L	GF	GA	GD	Pts	Qualification or relegation
1	Genk	30	21	5	4	55	33	+22	68	Qualification for the Champions' Play-offs (Note: The regular season winner will qualify for the 2025–26 UEFA Europa League if not earning 2025–26 UEFA Champions League in the playoff.)
2	Club Brugge	30	17	8	5	65	36	+29	59	Qualification for the Champions' play-offs
3	Union SG	30	15	10	5	49	25	+24	55	Qualification for the Champions' play-offs
4	Anderlecht	30	15	6	9	50	27	+23	51	Qualification for the Champions' play-offs
5	Antwerp	30	12	10	8	47	32	+15	46	Qualification for the Champions' play-offs
6	Gent	30	11	12	7	41	33	+8	45	Qualification for the Champions' play-offs
7	Standard Liège	30	10	9	11	22	35	−13	39	Qualification for the Europe play-offs
8	Mechelen	30	10	8	12	45	40	+5	38	Qualification for the Europe play-offs
9	Westerlo	30	10	7	13	50	49	+1	37	Qualification for the Europe play-offs
10	Charleroi	30	10	7	13	36	36	0	37	Qualification for the Europe play-offs
11	OH Leuven	30	8	13	9	28	33	−5	37	Qualification for the Europe play-offs
12	Dender EH	30	8	8	14	33	51	−18	32	Qualification for the Europe play-offs
13	Cercle Brugge	30	7	11	12	29	44	−15	32	Qualification for the Relegation play-offs
14	Sint-Truiden	30	7	10	13	41	56	−15	31	Qualification for the Relegation play-offs
15	Kortrijk	30	7	5	18	28	55	−27	26	Qualification for the Relegation play-offs
16	Beerschot	30	3	9	18	26	60	−34	18	Qualification for the Relegation play-offs

Source: Jupiler Pro League (in Dutch), Soccerway
Rules for classification: 1) Points; 2) Matches won; 3) Goal difference; 4) Goals scored; 5) Away matches won; 6) Away goal difference; 7) Away goals scored; 8) Play-off.

==== Champions play-offs ====
Pos	Team	Pld	W	D	L	GF	GA	GD	Pts	Qualification or relegation	USG	CLU	GNK	AND	ANT	GNT
1	Union SG (C)	10	9	1	0	22	3	+19	56	Qualification for the Champions League league phase		0–0	1–0	2–0	5–1	3–1
2	Club Brugge	10	7	2	1	21	6	+15	53	Qualification for the Champions League third qualifying round	0–1		1–0	2–0	1–1	4–1
3	Genk	10	4	1	5	14	11	+3	47	Qualification for the Europa League play-off round (Note: Club Brugge won the 2024–25 Belgian Cup and qualified for the Champions League through finishing second, the Europa League play-off round berth was therefore transferred to regular season winners Genk.)	1–2	0–2		2–1	0–1	4–0
4	Anderlecht	10	3	1	6	12	13	−1	36	Qualification for the Europa League second qualifying round	0–1	1–3	1–2		0–0	5–0
5	Antwerp	10	2	3	5	10	18	−8	32	Qualification for the European competition play-off	0–4	2–3	1–1	1–3		0–1
6	Gent	10	1	0	9	4	32	−28	26		0–3	0–5	1–4	0–1	0–3	

Source: Jupiler Pro League (in Dutch), Soccerway
Rules for classification: 1) Points; 2) Points without (possible) half points added due to rounding; 3) Regular season finishing position.
(C) Champions

==== Europe play-offs ====
Pos	Team	Pld	W	D	L	GF	GA	GD	Pts	Qualification or relegation	CHA	WES	MEC	DEN	STA	OHL
1	Charleroi (O)	10	6	3	1	19	10	+9	40	Qualification for the European competition play-off		4–3	3–0	4–1	1–0	2–1
2	Westerlo	10	3	5	2	19	16	+3	33		2–2		2–2	4–2	0–0	2–2
3	Mechelen	10	2	6	2	17	17	0	31		1–1	2–3		5–2	0–0	1–1
4	Dender EH	10	3	4	3	20	21	−1	29		2–1	1–0	2–2		1–1	5–0
5	Standard Liège	10	0	7	3	5	8	−3	27		0–1	1–1	2–2	0–0		0–1
6	OH Leuven	10	1	5	4	11	19	−8	27		0–0	0–2	1–2	4–4	1–1	

Source: Jupiler Pro League (in Dutch), Soccerway
Rules for classification: 1) Points; 2) Points without (possible) half points added due to rounding; 3) Regular season finishing position.
(O) Play-off winners

===== European competition play-off =====
29 May 2025	Antwerp	v	Charleroi	Antwerp, Belgium
				Stadium: Bosuilstadion

==== Relegation play-offs ====
Pos	Team	Pld	W	D	L	GF	GA	GD	Pts	Qualification or relegation	STR	CER	KOR	BEE
1	Sint-Truiden	6	3	1	2	9	10	−1	41			3–1	0–3	2–1
2	Cercle Brugge (O)	6	2	1	3	10	13	−3	39	Qualification for the promotion/relegation play-offs	3–1		0–2	2–1
3	Kortrijk (R)	6	3	2	1	12	8	+4	37	Relegation to Challenger Pro League	2–2	2–2		3–2
4	Beerschot (R)	6	2	0	4	10	10	0	24	Relegation to Challenger Pro League	0–1	4–2	2–0	

Source: Jupiler Pro League (in Dutch), Soccerway
Rules for classification: 1) Points; 2) Regular season finishing position.
(O) Play-off winners; (R) Relegated

===== Promotion/relegation play-offs =====
====== Bracket ======
Quarter-finals
7	Lokeren-Temse	2	2	4
3	RWD Molenbeek	0	3	3
5	Patro Eisden Maasmechelen	3	2	5
4	Beveren	2	1	3

Semi-finals
7	Lokeren-Temse	1	1	2
5	Patro Eisden Maasmechelen	2	1	3

Finals
14	Cercle Brugge	5	3	8
5	Patro Eisden Maasmechelen	1	1	2

====== Quarter-finals ======
24 April 2025	Lokeren-Temse	2–0	RWD Molenbeek	Lokeren, Belgium
20:30	Xavier Preijs 10' (o.g.); Vinck 14'			Stadium: Daknamstadion; Attendance: 2,676; Referee: Massimiliano Ledda

27 April 2025	RWD Molenbeek	3–2	Lokeren-Temse	Molenbeek-Saint-Jean, Belgium
19:15	Biron 34' (pen.); Vitor Hugo Morais de Oliveira 53'; Robail 71'		Nainggolan 85'; Ntamack 88'	Stadium: Edmond Machtens Stadium; Attendance: 2,869; Referee: Klass Clerkx

Lokeren-Temse won 4–3 on aggregate.

24 April 2025	Patro Eisden Maasmechelen	3–2	Beveren	Maasmechelen, Belgium
20:30	Kiankaulua 25'; Abid 40', 51'		Mertens 38'; Jans 71'	Stadium: Patro Stadion; Attendance: 1,011; Referee: Wesli De Cremer

27 April 2025	Beveren	1–2	Patro Eisden Maasmechelen	Beveren, Belgium
19:15	Mertens 86'		Kiankaulua 33'; Peeters 56'	Stadium: Freethiel Stadion; Attendance: 4,346; Referee: Kevin Van Damme

Patro Eisden Maasmechelen won 5–3 on aggregate.

====== Semi-finals ======
3 May 2025	Lokeren-Temse	1–2	Patro Eisden Maasmechelen	Lokeren, Belgium
16:00	Ntamack 63' (pen.)		Bammens 34', 78'	Stadium: Daknamstadion; Attendance: 5,062; Referee: Bert Verbeke

11 May 2025	Patro Eisden Maasmechelen	1–1	Lokeren-Temse	Maasmechelen, Belgium
16:00	Kis 38' (pen.)		Brebels 5'	Stadium: Patro Stadion; Attendance: 2,385; Referee: Nathan Verboomen

Patro Eisden Maasmechelen won 3–2 on aggregate.

====== Finals ======
18 May 2025	Patro Eisden Maasmechelen	1–5	Cercle Brugge	Maasmechelen, Belgium
19:15	Vancy Roméo Mabanza 90+3'		Agyekum 8'; Brunner 25', 51'; Felipe Augusto 58'; Somers 84'	Stadium: Patro Stadion; Attendance: 5,000; Referee: Nicolas Laforge

23 May 2025	Cercle Brugge	3–1	Patro Eisden Maasmechelen	Bruges, Belgium
20:45	Nazinho 5'; Felipe Augusto 24' (pen.); Erick Nunes 78'		Van Landschoot 67'	Stadium: Jan Breydel Stadium; Referee: Wim Smet

Cercle Brugge won 8–2 on aggregate and stayed in the Belgian Pro League for the 2025–26 season.

=== Challenger Pro League ===
==== Regular season ====
Pos	Team	Pld	W	D	L	GF	GA	GD	Pts	Qualification
1	Zulte Waregem (C, P)	28	18	5	5	55	30	+25	59	Promoted to Pro League
2	La Louvière (P)	28	17	8	3	50	24	+26	59	Promoted to Pro League
3	RWD Molenbeek	28	17	6	5	42	21	+21	57	Qualification for promotion play-offs
4	Beveren	28	14	9	5	41	27	+14	51	Qualification for promotion play-offs
5	Patro Eisden Maasmechelen	28	13	10	5	51	28	+23	49	Qualification for promotion play-offs
6	Club NXT	28	14	5	9	46	35	+11	47	Ineligible for promotion, promotion play-offs and (from matchday 24 on) also relegation
7	Lokeren-Temse	28	12	5	11	32	35	−3	41 (Note: Initially, Lokeren-Temse had not applied for a footballing license to play at the highest level of Belgian football. After the deadline had passed, the club had decided to apply for a license after all, but on 17 April this was denied. The club was therefore initially not allowed to participate in the promotion play-offs but appealed the decision, which allowed them to participate (instead of next placed Lierse). A final verdict still needs to be given, meaning that even if Lokeren-Temse were to win the promotion play-offs, they might still be denied promotion.)	Qualification for promotion play-offs
8	Lierse	28	11	7	10	40	35	+5	40	
9	RFC Liège	28	9	7	12	38	44	−6	34	
10	Eupen	28	8	6	14	38	47	−9	30	
11	Lommel	28	8	5	15	32	46	−14	29	
12	Francs Borains	28	8	4	16	29	50	−21	28	
13	RSCA Futures	28	5	8	15	41	54	−13	23	Ineligible for promotion, promotion play-offs and (from matchday 24 on) also relegation
14	Seraing	28	3	10	15	28	55	−27	19	
15	Jong Genk	28	3	5	20	30	62	−32	14 (Note: The Pro League approved the new competition format for the coming seasons by the end of February. Part of the haggling between club presidents resulted in a new rule for the ongoing season which entered with immediate effect, stating that a minimum of four U23 would always need to be present in the Challenger Pro League. As only three teams are currently present, all three will be spared of relegation in case of ending in a relegation spot. At the time of the decision, there were still seven matchdays to play and Jong Genk was in a relegation spot. In case they overtake a non-U23 team, that team would however have face relegation. After the penultimate matchday, with Jong Genk now mathematically certain of finishing in 15th, the Pro League announced that Jong Genk had been relegated after all. Apparently, the league reform as decided and announced at the end of February was still not officially approved. On 16 June 2025, just weeks before the start of the 2025–26 Challenger Pro League, the Pro League announced that the High Council of the Belgian FA had approved the reform, meaning Jong Genk would be able to remain at the second level. The One week later, on 1 July 2025, Francs Borains, Lokeren-Temse and Seraing together launched a formal appeal against the reform citing it unfair that U23 cannot be relegated whilst non-U23 teams can. Should the Belgian Competition Authority rule in their favor, the start of the 2025–26 Challenger Pro League could be postponed. Meanwhile the new calendar, including Jong Genk, was already released on 3 July 2025.)	Ineligible for promotion, promotion play-offs and (from matchday 24 on) also relegation
16	Deinze (R)	0	0	0	0	0	0	0	−3 (Note: On 12 November 2024, Deinze was deducted 3 points for outstanding unpaid player wages. One month later, on 11 December 2024, the club was declared bankrupt and all its results were voided. The club will be considered last and only one other team will be relegated.)	Relegated to National Division 1

Source: Challenger Pro League
Rules for classification: 1) Points; 2) Matches won; 3) Goal difference; 4) Goals scored; 5) Away matches won; 6) Away goal difference; 7) Away goals made.
(C) Champions; (P) Promoted; (R) Relegated

=== Amateur Leagues ===
==== Belgian Division 1 ====
===== VV =====
Pos	Team	Pld	W	D	L	GF	GA	GD	Pts	Qualification or relegation
1	Jong KAA Gent (C, P)	30	19	5	6	63	31	32	62	Promoted to the Challenger Pro League
2	Knokke	30	14	14	2	53	31	22	56	
3	Hasselt	30	15	7	8	50	28	22	52	
4	Tienen	30	14	4	12	39	34	5	46	
5	Dessel	30	13	7	10	62	47	15	46	
6	Thes	30	12	9	9	50	42	8	45	
7	Ninove	30	12	7	11	39	40	−1	43	
8	Lyra-Lierse Berlaar	30	11	10	9	58	51	7	43	
9	Jong Cercle	30	12	4	14	54	53	1	40	
10	Belisia	30	10	9	11	38	43	−5	39	
11	Hoogstraten	30	10	8	12	43	45	−2	38	
12	OH Leuven U-23	30	10	6	14	46	53	−7	36	
13	Merelbeke	30	8	7	15	33	53	−20	31	
14	Cappellen (R)	30	8	5	17	40	72	−32	29	Relegation to Division 2
15	Young Reds Antwerp (R)	30	6	10	14	34	50	−16	28	Relegation to Division 2
16	Heist (R)	30	6	8	16	37	66	−29	26	Relegation to Division 2

Source: Nationaal : 1st klasse (in Dutch)
Rules for classification: 1) Points; 2) Matches won; 3) Goal difference; 4) Goals scored; 5) Away goals scored; 6) Away matches won.
(C) Champion; (P) Promoted; (R) Relegated

===== ACFF =====
Pos	Team	Pld	W	D	L	GF	GA	GD	Pts	Qualification or relegation
1	Olympic Charleroi	22	15	4	3	54	23	31	49	Qualification for Promotion play-offs
2	Tubize-Braine	22	14	5	3	51	20	31	47	Qualification for Promotion play-offs
3	Mons	22	13	7	2	39	14	25	46	Qualification for Promotion play-offs
4	Virton	22	14	2	6	38	26	12	44	Qualification for Promotion play-offs
5	Stockay	22	9	4	9	31	31	0	31	Qualification for Promotion play-offs
6	Rochefort	22	8	7	7	27	29	−2	31	Qualification for Promotion play-offs
7	Union Namur	22	7	3	12	25	40	−15	24	Qualification for Relegation play-offs
8	Binche	22	5	7	10	29	40	−11	22	Qualification for Relegation play-offs
9	Zébra Élites	22	5	7	10	20	36	−16	22	Qualification for Relegation play-offs
10	Union SG B	22	5	5	12	25	38	−13	20	Qualification for Relegation play-offs
11	Tournai	22	4	8	10	18	34	−16	20	Qualification for Relegation play-offs
12	SL16 FC	22	2	3	17	19	45	−26	9	Qualification for Relegation play-offs

Source: Nationaal : 1st klasse (in Dutch)
Rules for classification: 1) Points; 2) Matches won; 3) Goal difference; 4) Goals scored; 5) Away goals scored; 6) Away matches won.

==== Belgian Division 2 ====
===== VV A =====
Pos	Team	Pld	W	D	L	GF	GA	GD	Pts	Qualification or relegation
1	Roeselare (C, P)	30	20	5	5	53	24	+29	65	Promotion to the 2025–26 Belgian National Division 1
2	Oostkamp (Note: Oostkamp did not obtain a license for Division 1 and therefore did not qualify for the promotion play-offs.)	30	17	4	9	55	43	+12	55	
3	Zelzate (P)	30	15	9	6	70	43	+27	54	Qualification for the Promotion play-offs VV
4	Harelbeke	30	15	9	6	59	44	+15	54	Qualification for the Promotion play-offs VV
5	Oudenaarde (Note: Oudenaarde did not obtain a license for Division 1 and therefore did not qualify for the promotion play-offs.)	30	14	7	9	52	47	+5	49	
6	Dikkelvenne (Note: On December 10, 2024, Dikkelvenne announced that due to financial pressures they had opted to voluntarily relegate back to the Belgian Provincial Leagues) (R)	30	13	10	7	56	38	+18	49	Relegation to the Belgian Provincial Leagues
7	Jong Essevee	30	13	3	14	58	48	+10	42	Qualification for the Promotion play-offs VV
8	Westhoek	30	11	8	11	40	45	−5	41	
9	Petegem	30	11	7	12	47	55	−8	40	
10	Racing Gent	30	10	7	13	50	61	−11	37	
11	Lebbeke	30	8	12	10	52	54	−2	36	
12	Jong Westerlo (Note: The parent team K.V.C. Westerlo announced that they would be discontinuing their U23 team at the end of the season.) (R)	30	9	6	15	40	47	−7	33	Team discontinued
13	Torhout	30	8	8	14	44	59	−15	32	
14	Gullegem	30	8	7	15	46	55	−9	31	Qualification for the Relegation play-offs
15	Olsa Brakel (R)	30	7	7	16	40	65	−25	28	Relegation to the 2025–26 Belgian Division 3
16	Voorde-Appelterre (R)	30	5	3	22	33	67	−34	18	Relegation to the 2025–26 Belgian Division 3

Source: vbal4
Rules for classification: 1) Points; 2) Matches won; 3) Goal difference; 4) Goals scored; 5) Away matches won; 6) Goal difference in away matches; 7) Away goals scored.
(C) Champions; (P) Promoted; (R) Relegated

===== VV B =====
Pos	Team	Pld	W	D	L	GF	GA	GD	Pts	Qualification or relegation
1	Houtvenne (C, P)	30	19	8	3	69	27	+42	65	Promotion to the 2025–26 Belgian National Division 1
2	Rupel Boom	30	19	8	3	53	20	+33	65	Qualification for the Promotion play-offs VV
3	Diegem (P)	30	18	8	4	66	33	+33	62	Qualification for the Promotion play-offs VV
4	Termien (Note: Termien did not apply for a Division 1 license and therefore did not qualify for the promotion play-offs.)	30	14	6	10	59	49	+10	48	
5	Jong KV Mechelen	30	13	7	10	56	44	+12	46	Qualification for the Promotion play-offs VV
6	Racing Mechelen	30	12	10	8	47	45	+2	46	Qualification for the Promotion play-offs VV
7	Hades	30	13	5	12	40	42	−2	44	
8	Berg en Dal	30	12	5	13	42	48	−6	41	
9	Jong STVV	30	8	10	12	50	43	+7	34	
10	Berchem	30	8	10	12	37	49	−12	34	
11	Tongeren	30	8	8	14	27	41	−14	32	
12	Wellen	30	8	8	14	37	56	−19	32	
13	Bocholt	30	8	7	15	50	59	−9	31	
14	Lille (R)	30	9	3	18	40	67	−27	30	Qualification for the Relegation play-offs
15	Pelt (R)	30	6	11	13	35	45	−10	29	Relegation to the 2025–26 Belgian Division 3
16	Wezel (R)	30	4	8	18	38	78	−40	20	Relegation to the 2025–26 Belgian Division 3

Source: vbal4
Rules for classification: 1) Points; 2) Matches won; 3) Goal difference; 4) Goals scored; 5) Away matches won; 6) Goal difference in away matches; 7) Away goals scored.
(C) Champions; (P) Promoted; (R) Relegated

===== ACFF =====
Pos	Team	Pld	W	D	L	GF	GA	GD	Pts	Qualification or relegation
1	Crossing Schaerbeek (C, P)	34	22	10	2	61	27	+34	76	Promotion to the 2025–26 Belgian National Division 1
2	Meux (P)	34	21	9	4	68	31	+37	72	Qualification for the Promotion play-offs ACFF
3	Onhaye	34	19	7	8	51	33	+18	64	Qualification for the Promotion play-offs ACFF
4	Habay-la-Neuve (P)	34	18	6	10	49	30	+19	60	Qualification for the Promotion play-offs ACFF
5	Acren-Lessines (Note: Acren-Lessines did not obtain a license for Division 1 and therefore did not qualify for the promotion play-offs.)	34	16	9	9	53	39	+14	57	
6	Verviers	34	15	8	11	43	32	+11	53	Qualification for the Promotion play-offs ACFF
7	Raeren-Eynatten	34	15	7	12	37	36	+1	52	
8	La Calamine	34	14	8	12	55	45	+10	50	
9	Seraing B (R)	34	12	8	14	45	51	−6	44	Team discontinued from U-23
10	Jette	34	11	11	12	40	49	−9	44	
11	Manageoise	34	12	7	15	47	62	−15	43	
12	Aywaille	34	12	6	16	48	55	−7	42	
13	Ganshoren	34	10	11	13	45	49	−4	41	
14	Union Hutoise	34	9	10	15	47	54	−7	37	
15	Ostiches-Ath	34	9	8	17	40	57	−17	35	
16	Verlaine (R)	34	8	4	22	41	63	−22	28	Relegation to the 2025–26 Belgian Division 3
17	La Louvière Centre (R)	34	6	7	21	39	67	−28	25	Relegation to the 2025–26 Belgian Division 3
18	Eupen U23 (R)	34	6	6	22	38	67	−29	24	Relegation to the 2025–26 Belgian Division 3

Source: vbal4
Rules for classification: 1) Points; 2) Matches won; 3) Goal difference; 4) Goals scored; 5) Away matches won; 6) Goal difference in away matches; 7) Away goals scored.
(C) Champions; (P) Promoted; (R) Relegated

==== Belgian Division 3 ====
===== VV A =====
Pos	Team	Pld	W	D	L	GF	GA	GD	Pts	Qualification or relegation
1	Mandel United (C, P)	30	21	4	5	64	24	+40	67	Promotion to the 2025–26 Belgian Division 2
2	Hamme (P)	30	20	4	6	66	36	+30	64	Qualification for the Promotion play-offs VV
3	Diksmuide-Oostende (P)	30	18	5	7	46	24	+22	59	Qualification for the Promotion play-offs VV
4	Kalken (P)	30	16	2	12	61	41	+20	50	Qualification for the Promotion play-offs VV
5	Wetteren (P)	30	15	5	10	54	48	+6	50	Qualification for the Promotion play-offs VV
6	Erpe-Mere	30	12	8	10	48	40	+8	44	
7	Blankenberge	30	12	5	13	43	43	0	41	
8	Lede	30	12	5	13	35	39	−4	41	
9	Drongen	30	11	6	13	49	51	−2	39	
10	Lauwe	30	11	6	13	34	52	−18	39	
11	St-Denijs Sport	30	10	8	12	28	32	−4	38	
12	Elene Grotenberge	30	11	3	16	33	42	−9	36	
13	Wervik (R)	30	10	4	16	31	43	−12	34	Qualification for the Relegation play-offs VV
14	Wielsbeke (R)	30	7	7	16	46	70	−24	28	Relegation to the 2025–26 Belgian Provincial Leagues
15	Beerschot U23 (R)	30	5	8	17	34	56	−22	23	Relegation to the 2025–26 Belgian Provincial Leagues
16	Stekene (R)	30	5	8	17	35	66	−31	23	Relegation to the 2025–26 Belgian Provincial Leagues

Source: vbal4
Rules for classification: 1) Points; 2) Matches won; 3) Goal difference; 4) Goals scored; 5) Away matches won; 6) Goal difference in away matches; 7) Away goals scored.
(C) Champions; (P) Promoted; (R) Relegated

===== VV B =====
Pos	Team	Pld	W	D	L	GF	GA	GD	Pts	Qualification or relegation
1	Mandel United (C, P)	30	21	4	5	64	24	+40	67	Promotion to the 2025–26 Belgian Division 2
2	Hamme (P)	30	20	4	6	66	36	+30	64	Qualification for the Promotion play-offs VV
3	Diksmuide-Oostende (P)	30	18	5	7	46	24	+22	59	Qualification for the Promotion play-offs VV
4	Kalken (P)	30	16	2	12	61	41	+20	50	Qualification for the Promotion play-offs VV
5	Wetteren (P)	30	15	5	10	54	48	+6	50	Qualification for the Promotion play-offs VV
6	Erpe-Mere	30	12	8	10	48	40	+8	44	
7	Blankenberge	30	12	5	13	43	43	0	41	
8	Lede	30	12	5	13	35	39	−4	41	
9	Drongen	30	11	6	13	49	51	−2	39	
10	Lauwe	30	11	6	13	34	52	−18	39	
11	St-Denijs Sport	30	10	8	12	28	32	−4	38	
12	Elene Grotenberge	30	11	3	16	33	42	−9	36	
13	Wervik (R)	30	10	4	16	31	43	−12	34	Qualification for the Relegation play-offs VV
14	Wielsbeke (R)	30	7	7	16	46	70	−24	28	Relegation to the 2025–26 Belgian Provincial Leagues
15	Beerschot U23 (R)	30	5	8	17	34	56	−22	23	Relegation to the 2025–26 Belgian Provincial Leagues
16	Stekene (R)	30	5	8	17	35	66	−31	23	Relegation to the 2025–26 Belgian Provincial Leagues

Source: vbal4
Rules for classification: 1) Points; 2) Matches won; 3) Goal difference; 4) Goals scored; 5) Away matches won; 6) Goal difference in away matches; 7) Away goals scored.
(C) Champions; (P) Promoted; (R) Relegated

===== ACFF A =====
Pos	Team	Pld	W	D	L	GF	GA	GD	Pts	Qualification or relegation
1	Braine (C, P)	26	18	7	1	64	27	+37	61	Promotion to the 2025–26 Belgian Division 2
2	Flénu (P)	26	16	4	6	65	32	+33	52	Qualification for the Promotion play-offs ACFF
3	Sporting Bruxelles (P)	26	15	3	8	46	26	+20	48	Qualification for the Promotion play-offs ACFF
4	Evere	26	14	4	8	74	51	+23	46	Qualification for the Promotion play-offs ACFF
5	Arquet	26	14	4	8	48	42	+6	46	Qualification for the Promotion play-offs ACFF
6	St-Ghislain Tertre Hautrage	26	12	8	6	46	28	+18	44	
7	Monceau	26	12	5	9	48	35	+13	41	
8	Ciney	26	9	4	13	37	50	−13	31	
9	Biesme	26	7	5	14	42	49	−7	26	
10	Loyers	26	7	5	14	32	60	−28	26	
11	Buzet	26	6	7	13	30	56	−26	25	
12	Aische	26	5	7	14	23	48	−25	22	
13	Jodoigne	26	5	5	16	28	50	−22	20	Qualification for the Relegation play-offs ACFF
14	Rebecq (R)	26	4	8	14	31	60	−29	20	Relegation to the 2025–26 Belgian Provincial Leagues
15	Perwez (Note: Following three consecutive forfeits Perwez were forced to forfeit the remainder of their season and to be relegated to the Belgian Provincial Leagues) (R)	0	0	0	0	0	0	0	0	Disqualified, Relegation to the 2025–26; Belgian Provincial Leagues
16	Belœil (Note: Following three consecutive forfeits Beloeil were forced to forfeit the remainder of their season and to be relegated to the Belgian Provincial Leagues) (R)	0	0	0	0	0	0	0	0	Disqualified, Relegation to the 2025–26; Belgian Provincial Leagues

Source: RBFA
Rules for classification: 1) Points; 2) Matches won; 3) Goal difference; 4) Goals scored; 5) Away matches won; 6) Goal difference in away matches; 7) Away goals scored.
(C) Champions; (P) Promoted; (R) Relegated

===== ACFF B =====
Pos	Team	Pld	W	D	L	GF	GA	GD	Pts	Qualification or relegation
1	Richelle United (C, P)	30	21	6	3	79	24	+55	69	Promotion to the 2025–26 Belgian Division 2
2	Elsautoise	30	16	7	7	60	36	+24	55	Qualification for the Promotion play-offs ACFF
3	Sprimont	30	15	9	6	59	32	+27	54	Qualification for the Promotion play-offs ACFF
4	Du Geer	30	15	5	10	48	42	+6	50	Qualification for the Promotion play-offs ACFF
5	Tilff (P)	30	13	10	7	46	36	+10	49	Qualification for the Promotion play-offs ACFF
6	Mormont	30	12	12	6	50	37	+13	48	
7	Aubel	30	11	10	9	48	34	+14	43	
8	Meix-dt-Virton	30	12	6	12	39	42	−3	42	
9	Eupen 1963	30	13	2	15	48	64	−16	41	
10	Harre-Manhay	30	10	9	11	44	50	−6	39	
11	Marloie	30	11	5	14	43	55	−12	38	
12	Waremmien	30	10	7	13	52	45	+7	37	
13	Libramont	30	10	5	15	44	51	−7	35	Qualification for the Relegation play-offs ACFF
14	Gouvy (R)	30	8	5	17	38	61	−23	29	Relegation to the 2025–26 Belgian Provincial Leagues
15	Hamoir (R)	30	5	6	19	28	60	−32	21	Relegation to the 2025–26 Belgian Provincial Leagues
16	Oppagne-Weris (R)	30	3	6	21	27	84	−57	15	Relegation to the 2025–26 Belgian Provincial Leagues

Source: RBFA
Rules for classification: 1) Points; 2) Matches won; 3) Goal difference; 4) Goals scored; 5) Away matches won; 6) Goal difference in away matches; 7) Away goals scored.
(C) Champions; (P) Promoted; (R) Relegated

=== Cup competitions ===
Competition	Winner	Score	Runner-up
2024–25 Belgian Cup	Club Brugge	2–1	Anderlecht
2024 Belgian Super Cup	Union Saint-Gilloise	2–1	Club Brugge

== Managerial changes ==
This is a list of changes of managers within Belgian professional league football:

=== Pro League ===
Team	Outgoing manager	Manner of departure	Date of vacancy	Position	Replaced by	Date of appointment
Gent	(Belgium) Hein Vanhaezebrouck	End of contract	30 June 2024	Pre-season	(Belgium) Wouter Vrancken	5 June 2024
Genk	(Belgium) Domenico Olivieri (Belgium) Michel Ribeiro (Belgium) Eddy Vanhemel	End of caretaker spell	30 June 2024	Pre-season	(Germany) Thorsten Fink	5 June 2024
Westerlo	(Belgium) Bart Goor	End of caretaker spell	30 June 2024	Pre-season	(Belgium) Timmy Simons	23 May 2024 (Note: While the announcement of Timmy Simons's signature at Westerlo was already made on 23 May 2024, Bart Goor remained in charge as caretaker manager for the last match of the season and Simons thus only officially took up the position as soon as the 2023–24 season ended.)
Dender	(Belgium) Timmy Simons	Signed by Westerlo	30 June 2024	Pre-season	(Belgium) Vincent Euvrard	31 May 2024
Antwerp	(Netherlands) Mark van Bommel	End of contract	30 June 2024	Pre-season	(Belgium) Jonas De Roeck	4 June 2024
Sint-Truiden	(Germany) Thorsten Fink	Signed by Genk	30 June 2024	Pre-season	(Italy) Christian Lattanzio	14 June 2024
Union SG	(Germany) Alexander Blessin	Signed by St. Pauli	30 June 2024	Pre-season	(Belgium) Sébastien Pocognoli	7 July 2024
Sint-Truiden	(Italy) Christian Lattanzio	Sacked	3 September 2024	15th	(Belgium) Felice Mazzù	5 September 2024
Anderlecht	(Denmark) Brian Riemer	Sacked	19 September 2024	4th	(Belgium) David Hubert (Note: David Hubert was initially appointed as caretaker manager, but on 10 October 2024 it was confirmed he was appointed as full time manager.)	19 September 2024
OH Leuven	(Spain) Óscar García	Sacked	22 November 2024	13th	(Belgium) Hans Somers (caretaker)	22 November 2024
OH Leuven	(Belgium) Hans Somers (caretaker)	End of caretaker spell	2 December 2024	13th	(Wales) Chris Coleman	2 December 2024 (Note: While the announcement of Chris Coleman's signature at OH Leuven was already made on 30 November 2024, Hans Somers remained in charge as caretaker manager for the upcoming match two days later against Anderlecht and Coleman only officially took up the position the day after that match.)
Cercle Brugge	(Austria) Miron Muslić	Sacked	2 December 2024	15th	(Belgium) Jimmy De Wulf (caretaker)	2 December 2024
Cercle Brugge	(Belgium) Jimmy De Wulf	End of caretaker spell	10 December 2024	15th	(Austria) Ferdinand Feldhofer	10 December 2024
Kortrijk	(Iceland) Freyr Alexandersson	Sacked	17 December 2024	14th	(Belgium) Yves Vanderhaeghe	18 December 2024
Gent	(Belgium) Wouter Vrancken	Mutual consent	21 January 2025	6th	(Bosnia and Herzegovina) Danijel Milićević (caretaker)	21 January 2025
Kortrijk	(Belgium) Yves Vanderhaeghe	Sacked	19 February 2025	15th	(Germany) Bernd Storck	20 February 2025
Antwerp	(Belgium) Jonas De Roeck	Sacked	3 March 2025	5th	(Netherlands) Andries Ulderink	4 March 2025
Mechelen	(Albania) Besnik Hasi	Sacked	4 March 2025	10th	(Belgium) Frederik Vanderbiest (caretaker)	4 March 2025
Cercle Brugge	(Austria) Ferdinand Feldhofer	Sacked	17 March 2025	13th	(Belgium) Jimmy De Wulf	21 March 2025
Anderlecht	(Belgium) David Hubert	Replaced	20 March 2025	4th	(Albania) Besnik Hasi	20 March 2025
Sint-Truiden	(Belgium) Felice Mazzù	Sacked	10 April 2025	2nd (relegation play-offs)	(Belgium) Frédéric De Meyer (caretaker)	10 April 2025
Sint-Truiden	(Belgium) Frédéric De Meyer (caretaker)	End of caretaker spell	15 April 2025	1st (relegation play-offs)	(Belgium) Wouter Vrancken	15 April 2025
Kortrijk	(Germany) Bernd Storck	Signed by Cercle Brugge	12 May 2025	3rd (relegation play-offs)	not replaced (season ended)	
Cercle Brugge	(Belgium) Jimmy De Wulf	Replaced	12 May 2025	2nd (relegation play-offs)	(Germany) Bernd Storck	12 May 2025

== See also ==
- 2024–25 Belgian Pro League
- 2024–25 Challenger Pro League
- 2024–25 Belgian Division 1
- 2024–25 Belgian Division 2
- 2024–25 Belgian Division 3
- 2024–25 Belgian Cup
- 2024 Belgian Super Cup
