= 2022–23 Belgian Division 3 =

Belgian Division 3
- Season: 2022–23
- Champions: Overijse (VV A), Wezel (VV B), Mons (ACFF A) & Rochefort (ACFF B)
- Promoted: Overijse, Wezel, Mons, Rochefort, Voorde-Appelterre, Houtvenne, Tournai, La Calamine

The 2022–23 Belgian Division 3 is the seventh season of the division in its current format, placed at the fifth-tier of football in Belgium.

== Team changes ==
=== In ===
- Relegated from the 2021–22 Belgian Division 2 were Houtvenne, Wijgmaal, Couvin-Mariembourg, Givry and Durbuy.
- Promoted from the Belgian Provincial Leagues were:
  - Champions for each of the provincial leagues: Wezel (Antwerp), Léopold (Brabant ACFF), Kampenhout (Brabant VV), Hoger Op Kalken (East Flanders), Monceau (Hainaut), La Calamine (Liège), Libramont (Luxembourg), Ciney (Namur), Wielsbeke (West-Flanders)
  - In Limburg, Schoonbeek-Beverst took over the promotion spot of champions Achel, who did not ask for licence and were hence ineligible for promotion.
  - Due to teams folding and/or voluntarily relegating at this and higher levels, extra spots opened up:
    - Two extra teams were promoted from East-Flanders: Elene Grotenberge and Aalter.
    - Two extra teams were promoted from West-Flanders: Roeselare-Daisel and Wervik.
  - Winners of the interprovincial round on VV side: ASV Geel, Drongen and Rumbeke.
  - Winners of the interprovincial round on ACFF side: Meix-dt-Virton.

=== Out ===
- Directly promoted into the Belgian Division 2 were 2021–22 Belgian Division 3 champions Oostkamp (VV A), Racing Mechelen (VV B), Union Namur (ACFF A) and Dison (ACFF B).
- Six teams also gained promotion following wins in the promotion play-offs: Lebbeke, Torhout, Erpe-Mere United, Lille, Turnhout and Binche.
- Relegated based on their finishing positions last season were
  - Melsele, Sint-Niklaas and Rhode-De Hoek from division VV A,
  - De Kempen, Berlaar-Heikant and Koersel from division VV B,
  - Pont-à-Celles-Buzet and Stockel from division ACFF A, and
  - Oppagne-Wéris, Wanze Bas-Oha and Gouvy from division ACFF B.
- Due to financial difficulties, Lochristi opted to drop down to the Belgian Provincial Leagues.

== Belgian Division 3 VV A ==
Locations of the 2022–23 Belgian Division 3 VV A teams

=== League table ===
Pos	Team	Pld	W	D	L	GF	GA	GD	Pts	Qualification or relegation
1	Overijse (C, P)	28	20	3	5	67	30	+37	63	Promotion to the 2023–24 Belgian Division 2
2	Voorde-Appelterre (P)	28	16	5	7	54	39	+15	53	Qualification for the Promotion play-offs VV
3	Hamme	28	15	8	5	51	34	+17	53	Qualification for the Promotion play-offs VV
4	Kalken	28	13	8	7	47	32	+15	47	Qualification for the Promotion play-offs VV
5	Wielsbeke	28	12	5	11	55	49	+6	41	Qualification for the Promotion play-offs VV
6	Lede	28	11	6	11	44	37	+7	39	
7	Roeselare-Daisel	28	9	11	8	39	37	+2	38	
8	Stekene	28	9	9	10	43	40	+3	36	
9	Wolvertem Merchtem	28	10	5	13	34	45	−11	35	
10	Wervik	28	9	8	11	50	52	−2	35	
11	Elene Grotenberge	28	8	10	10	46	48	−2	34	
12	Aalter	28	9	5	14	38	60	−22	32	
13	Drongen (R)	28	7	11	10	27	36	−9	32	Qualification for the Relegation play-offs VV
14	Rumbeke (R)	28	6	4	18	30	57	−27	22	Relegation to the 2023–24 Belgian Provincial Leagues
15	Eppegem (R)	28	4	6	18	19	48	−29	18	Relegation to the 2023–24 Belgian Provincial Leagues
16	Anzegem (Note: Due to financial difficulties Anzegem was forced to hand in a general forfait for the remainder of the league on 22 February 2023, with still 9 matchdays to go. As per the rules of the Belgian FA, Anzegem was removed from the league, the result of all matches played declared void, and the matches still to be played were cancelled. The club will only be able to restart at the very bottom of the league for the coming season.) (R)	0	0	0	0	0	0	0	0	Relegation to the 2023–24 Belgian Provincial Leagues

Source: vbal4
Rules for classification: 1) Points; 2) Matches won; 3) Goal difference; 4) Goals scored; 5) Away matches won; 6) Goal difference in away matches; 7) Away goals scored.
(C) Champions; (P) Promoted; (R) Relegated

== Belgian Division 3 VV B ==
Locations of the 2022–23 Belgian Division 3 VV B teams

=== League table ===
Pos	Team	Pld	W	D	L	GF	GA	GD	Pts	Qualification or relegation
1	Wezel (C, P)	30	20	5	5	75	39	+36	65	Promotion to the 2023–24 Belgian Division 2
2	Termien	30	19	7	4	63	32	+31	64	Qualification for the Promotion play-offs VV
3	Houtvenne (P)	30	18	9	3	80	26	+54	63	Qualification for the Promotion play-offs VV
4	Geel	30	15	12	3	64	37	+27	57	Qualification for the Promotion play-offs VV
5	Wellen	30	16	5	9	58	53	+5	53	Qualification for the Promotion play-offs VV
6	Sint-Lenaarts	30	13	9	8	49	36	+13	48	
7	Betekom	30	10	11	9	53	54	−1	41	
8	Diest	30	11	5	14	37	46	−9	38	
9	Zwarte Leeuw	30	10	6	14	51	60	−9	36	
10	Pelt	30	8	11	11	36	41	−5	35	
11	Schoonbeek-Beverst	30	8	9	13	28	49	−21	33	
12	Nijlen	30	7	9	14	39	60	−21	30	
13	Witgoor (O)	30	7	6	17	42	56	−14	27	Qualification for the Relegation play-offs VV
14	Kampenhout (R)	30	7	6	17	40	67	−27	27	Relegation to the 2023–24 Belgian Provincial Leagues
15	Wijgmaal (R)	30	6	5	19	33	67	−34	23	Relegation to the 2023–24 Belgian Provincial Leagues
16	Beringen (R)	30	5	5	20	37	62	−25	20	Relegation to the 2023–24 Belgian Provincial Leagues

Source: vbal4
Rules for classification: 1) Points; 2) Matches won; 3) Goal difference; 4) Goals scored; 5) Away matches won; 6) Goal difference in away matches; 7) Away goals scored.
(C) Champions; (O) Play-off winners; (P) Promoted; (R) Relegated

== Belgian Division 3 ACFF A ==
Locations of the 2022–23 Belgian Division 3 ACFF A teams

=== League table ===
Pos	Team	Pld	W	D	L	GF	GA	GD	Pts	Qualification or relegation
1	Mons (C, P)	30	21	4	5	61	19	+42	67	Promotion to the 2023–24 Belgian Division 2
2	Onhaye	30	17	6	7	55	34	+21	57	Qualification for the Promotion play-offs ACFF
3	Symphorinois	30	15	8	7	45	38	+7	53	Qualification for the Promotion play-offs ACFF
4	Tournai (O, P)	30	13	10	7	48	34	+14	49	Qualification for the Promotion play-offs ACFF
5	Crossing Schaerbeek	30	13	9	8	43	33	+10	48	
6	Aische	30	13	8	9	62	44	+18	47	
7	Ostiches-Ath	30	13	7	10	40	37	+3	46	
8	Manageoise	30	12	6	12	39	41	−2	42	Qualification for the Promotion play-offs ACFF
9	Monceau	30	11	9	10	46	44	+2	42	
10	Tamines	30	9	9	12	33	37	−4	36	
11	CS Braine	30	8	9	13	40	44	−4	33	
12	Jodoigne	30	8	8	14	42	52	−10	32	
13	Couvin-Mariembourg	30	8	7	15	37	50	−13	31	Qualification for the Relegation play-offs ACFF
14	Saint-Ghislain (R)	30	7	10	13	42	60	−18	31	Relegation to the 2023–24 Belgian Provincial Leagues
15	Gosselies (R)	30	5	8	17	34	62	−28	23	Relegation to the 2023–24 Belgian Provincial Leagues
16	Léopold (R)	30	6	4	20	23	61	−38	22	Relegation to the 2023–24 Belgian Provincial Leagues

Source: vbal4
Rules for classification: 1) Points; 2) Matches won; 3) Goal difference; 4) Goals scored; 5) Away matches won; 6) Goal difference in away matches; 7) Away goals scored.
(C) Champions; (O) Play-off winners; (P) Promoted; (R) Relegated

== Belgian Division 3 ACFF B ==
Locations of the 2022–23 Belgian Division 3 ACFF B teams

=== League table ===
Pos	Team	Pld	W	D	L	GF	GA	GD	Pts	Qualification or relegation
1	Rochefort (C, P)	30	22	3	5	63	23	+40	69	Promotion to the 2022–23 Belgian Division 2
2	Raeren-Eynatten	30	16	8	6	60	32	+28	56	Qualification for the Promotion play-offs ACFF
3	Richelle	30	16	7	7	55	33	+22	55	Qualification for the Promotion play-offs ACFF
4	Habay	30	13	13	4	51	32	+19	52	Qualification for the Promotion play-offs ACFF
5	La Calamine (O, P)	30	13	8	9	57	43	+14	47	Qualification for the Promotion play-offs ACFF
6	Mormont	30	13	8	9	56	52	+4	47	
7	Sprimont	30	14	4	12	66	46	+20	46	
8	Huy	30	11	12	7	49	31	+18	45	
9	Aywaille	30	9	15	6	47	40	+7	42	
10	Ciney	30	10	11	9	55	52	+3	41	
11	Marloie	30	10	8	12	40	47	−7	38	
12	Meix-dt-Virton	30	8	6	16	39	52	−13	30	
13	Herstal (O)	30	7	7	16	45	65	−20	28	Qualification for the Relegation play-offs ACFF
14	Libramont (R)	30	4	13	13	42	63	−21	25	Relegation to the 2022–23 Belgian Provincial Leagues
15	Durbuy (R)	30	5	5	20	46	85	−39	20	Relegation to the 2022–23 Belgian Provincial Leagues
16	Givry (R)	30	4	2	24	33	108	−75	14	Relegation to the 2022–23 Belgian Provincial Leagues

Source: vbal4
Rules for classification: 1) Points; 2) Matches won; 3) Goal difference; 4) Goals scored; 5) Away matches won; 6) Goal difference in away matches; 7) Away goals scored.
(C) Champions; (O) Play-off winners; (P) Promoted; (R) Relegated

== Championship matches ==
Both the two VV and two ACFF teams winning their leagues can arrange a title match to determine the overall VV and ACFF champions of the Belgian Division 3. This season, the overall ACFF champion was decided in a single match, with Rochefort winning the title. On VV side, Overijse and Wezel decided not to play a championship match. There was hence also no match between the overall VV and ACFF champions.

=== Championship match ACFF ===
5 May 2022
20:00

Mons	2–4 (a.e.t.)	Rochefort
Wildemeersch 38' (pen.); Cardon 90'	report	Lazitch 54'; Etienne 68'; Cornet 107', 110'

Referee: Thomas Beluffi

Rochefort was awarded the symbolic title of Belgian Division 3 ACFF champion.

== Promotion play-offs ==
=== Promotion play-offs VV ===
The teams finishing in second place in the Belgian Division 3 VV A and Belgian Division 3 VV B take part in a promotion playoff first round together with the three period winners from both these divisions. These 8 teams from the VV play the first round of a promotion playoff, with the four winners moving into round 2. The winners of round 2 are promoted to the 2023–24 Belgian Division 2. Losing teams continue in round 3 in case extra places open up.

In both divisions, the teams in places 2 through 5 qualified as no teams outside the top 5 had managed to win a period.

==== VV Round 1 ====
6 May 2023
18:00

Wielsbeke	1–2	Termien
Halilovic 93'	report	Dauwe 7', 44'

Referee: Saelens
7 May 2023
15:00

Voorde-Appelterre	2–1 (a.e.t.)	Kalken
De Drie 52'; Movoto 111'	report	Poppe 38'

Referee: Erik Bury
7 May 2023
15:00

Wellen	0–1	Houtvenne
	report	Dequevy 76'

7 May 2023
15:00

Hamme	2–2 (a.e.t.)	Geel
Van Osselaer 16'; Benkaddouri 115'	report	Aissa 90+1'; Robin 98'
Penalties
	3–4

Wielsbeke, Kalken, Wellen and Hamme were eliminated. The winning teams qualified for the Promotion play-offs VV Round 2.

==== VV Round 2 ====
14 May 2023
15:00

Voorde-Appelterre	6–1	Geel
D'Hoore 11'; Figys 20', 32'; De Drie 28', 83'; Lepage 51'	report	Kreydt 1'

14 May 2023
15:00

Termien	1–2	Houtvenne
Dauwe 23'	report	Dequevy 27', 67'

Voorde-Appelterre and Houtvenne were promoted, while Termien and Geel will enter round 3 of the VV play-offs.

==== VV Round 3 ====
18 May 2023
15:00

Termien	0–1	Geel
		Joosten 15'

By winning, ASV Geel became first in line to promote in case a spot opened up.

=== Promotion play-offs ACFF ===
The teams finishing in second place in the Belgian Division 3 ACFF A and Belgian Division 3 ACFF B take part in a promotion playoff first round together with the three period winners from both these divisions. These eight teams played off for one single promotion place up for grabs.

In the ACFF B division, the teams in places 2 through 5 qualified as no teams outside the top 5 had managed to win a period, however this was not the case in ACFF A where 8th-place finisher Manageoise won a period and qualified, together with the teams in places 2 through 4.

==== ACFF Round 1 ====
7 May 2023
15:00

Raeren-Eynatten	2–1	Richelle
Lauffs 6' (pen.); B. Halleux 41' (o.g.)	report	Zougar 55'

Referee: Auryan Arcoly
7 May 2023
15:00

Manageoise	0–2	Habay
	report	Toussaint 15'; Copette 90+5' (pen.)

Referee: Mehdi Sayoud
7 May 2023
15:00

Symphorinois	0–3	La Calamine
	report	Hubert 21', 90+4' (pen.); Belle 58'

Stade Charles Tondreau
Attendance: Mons
Referee: Thibaut Patris
7 May 2023
15:00

Onhaye	2–2 (a.e.t.)	Tournai
Defresne 15'; Lorenzon 24'	report	Destrain 65'; Brouckaert 90'
Penalties
Gilain (penalty scored); Lizen (penalty scored); Gall (penalty missed); Lambert (penalty missed); Bouterbiat (penalty missed)	2–3	(penalty scored) Amury; (penalty missed) Lekehal; (penalty scored) Pieraert; (penalty scored) Calon

Referee: Ibrahim Afifi

Richelle, Manageoise, Symphorinois and Onhaye were eliminated. The winning teams qualified for the Promotion play-offs ACFF Round 2.

==== ACFF Round 2 ====
14 May 2023
15:00

La Calamine	2–1 (a.e.t.)	Raeren-Eynatten
Hubert 85'; Mauclet 100'	report	Klauser 9'

Referee: Farid Louai
14 May 2023
15:00

Habay	0–1	Tournai
	report	Holuigue 86'

Referee: Jerome Meys

La Calamine and Tournai were promoted, while Raeren-Eynatten and Habay were eliminated.

==== ACFF Round 3 ====
21 May 2023
15:00

Tournai	2–0	La Calamine
Bellia; Destrain

The match had no significance as both clubs were already certain of promotion.

== Relegation play-offs ==
=== ACFF ===
7 May 2023
15:00

Couvin-Mariembourg	2–3	Herstal
Duchesne 62'; Davrichov 90'	report	Wanderson 58' (pen.); Karatas 83'; Goossens 85' (o.g.)

Referee: Michael Massaki

Prior to the match, results in higher divisions had resulted in this match becoming obsolete as both winner and loser of the match would be spared of relegation. The match was played nonetheless.

=== VV ===
7 May 2023
15:00

Drongen	0–1	Witgoor
	report	Blockx 43'

Prior to the match, it was known that the loser of this VV play-off would be relegated, while the winner would need to await the results of higher divisions. Drongen was thus relegated while Witgoor Dessel was unsure. On 27 May 2023, following the loss of La Louvière Centre in the Promotion play-offs Final of the 2022–23 Belgian Division 2, there would be no extra relegations on VV side and hence Witgoor was spared of relegation.

== Number of teams by provinces ==
Number of teams	Province or region	Team(s) in VV A	Team(s) in VV B	Team(s) in ACFF A	Team(s) in ACFF B
8	East Flanders	Aalter, Drongen, Elene Grotenberge, Hamme, Kalken, Lede, Stekene and Voorde-Appelterre	none	–	–
8	Hainaut	–	–	Gosselies, Manage, Monceau, Ostiches-Ath, Mons, Saint-Ghislain, Symphorinois, Tournai	none
7	Antwerp	none	Geel, Houtvenne, Nijlen, Sint-Lenaarts, Wezel, Witgoor and Zwarte Leeuw	–	–
7	Flemish Brabant	Eppegem, Overijse and Wolvertem Merchtem	Betekom, Diest, Kampenhout and Wijgmaal	–	–
7	Liège	–	–	none	Aywaille, Herstal, Huy, La Calamine, Raeren-Eynatten, Richelle, Sprimont
7	Luxembourg	–	–	none	Durbuy, Givry, Habay, Libramont, Marloie, Meix-dt-Virton, Mormont
6	Namur	–	–	Aische, Couvin-Mariembourg, Onhaye and Tamines	Ciney and Rochefort
5	Limburg	none	Beringen, Pelt, Schoonbeek-Beverst, Termien and Wellen	–	–
5	West Flanders	Anzegem, Roeselare-Daisel, Rumbeke, Wervik and Wielsbeke	none	–	–
2	Brussels	none	none	Léopold and Schaerbeek	none
2	Walloon Brabant	–	–	CS Braine and Jodoigne	none
