= KFC Voorde-Appelterre =

Belgian football club

Voorde-Appelterre
- Full name: Koninklijke Fusieclub Voorde-Appelterre
- Founded: 1938; 88 years ago (foundation); 1943; 83 years ago (registration); 2014; 12 years ago (merger); Matricule number 3861
- Ground: Molenveldweg, Appelterre
- League: Belgian Division 2
- 2026–27: Belgian Division 3 VV A, 2nd of 16 (promoted via play-offs)
- Website: www.kfcvoordeappelterre.com
Home colours

Koninklijke Fusieclub Voorde-Appelterre, commonly KFC Voorde-Appelterre, is a Belgian association football club from the villages of Voorde and Appelterre-Eichem, both part of the municipality of Ninove in East Flanders. The club is the result of a merger of SV Voorde (matricule 8262) and KE Appelterre-Eichem (matricule 3964) in 2018, and continues under the latter's matricule number, thus officially the successor of the team founded in 1938. Its colours are red and green. The club's first team plays at Appelterre, while the youth teams are based at Voorde. Voorde-Appelterre competes in Belgian Division 2, the fourth tier of Belgian football, in the 2026–27 season.

== History ==
=== Predecessor clubs ===
Already in the period around World War I a football team was active in Appelterre, named St.-Louis-Club, but only in 1938 a team was registered with the Flemish Football Union under the name Eendracht Appelterre, which then obtained an official matricule number upon registration with the Belgian Football Association in 1943. Eendracht Appelterre started at the lowest level, the third provincial division C. Promotion to the second provincial level was first achieved in 1968, and four seasons later in 1972 also to the first provincial level following a preculiar testmatch against FC Brakel. The match ended in a draw and even after two regular 15 minute prolongations and two extra 7.5 minute prolongations the game remained a tie. Eendracht Appelterre was awarded the promotion due to having had more corner kicks, as was the rule at the time.

The club relegated back to the second provincial division in 1975, and would ultimately drop back two more levels to the fourth provincial division, after relegating in 1989 and 1991. The club immediately climbed back up to the third provincial level in 1992 as vice-champions and would continue to climb. After becoming champions in the first provincial division in 2007, Eendracht Appelterre reached the national levels for the first time in its existence. Intensive years followed with relegation in 2008, promotion back to the national level in 2010, relegation in 2011, a third promotion to the national level in 2012 followed by a renaming to K.E. Appelterre-Eichem, until a final relegation in 2013, after which the club remained in the first provincial division until the merger in 2018. One of the final highlights occurred in 2014, when former Belgian international and Belgian Golden Shoe winner Wesley Sonck arrived to end his playing career at the club.

SV Voorde was founded in 1969 and joined the Belgian Football Association in 1975, playing in yellow and black. Following a political incident, the club colours were changed to green and white in 1976. It spent decades moving between the provincial divisions, winning the third provincial division title in 2001, the second provincial division title in 2008 and 2014. The club remained in the first provincial division alongside Appelterre(-Eichem) until the merger in 2018.

=== Merger and promotion to the national divisions (2018–2022) ===
After earlier merger talks involving both clubs had broken down, SV Voorde and KE Appelterre-Eichem agreed in 2018 to merge from the 2018–19 season, with the new club taking over the matricule of Appelterre-Eichem and continuing under the name KFC Voorde-Appelterre. In its first season in the East Flanders First Provincial division, the club finished eighth. The following season (2019–20), the club was leading the table when the season was halted prematurely by the COVID-19 pandemic and was declared champion, earning promotion to the national Third Amateur Division (renamed Division 3 in 2020). COVID-19 prematurely ended the 2020–21 season and after a stable season after, Voorde-Appelterre became runners-up in the Division 3 VV A behind Overijse, but then won the promotion play-offs to reach Belgian Division 2 for the first time.
