= 2025–26 Belgian Division 3 =

Belgian Division 3
- Season: 2025–26
- Dates: 23 August 2025 – May 2026
- Champions: VV A: Tempo Overijse; VV B: De Kempen; ACFF A: Stade Mouscronnois; ACFF B: Eupen U23
- Promoted: Tempo Overijse, De Kempen, Stade Mouscronnois, Eupen U23, Wilrijk, Eendracht Aalst Lede, Voorde-Appelterre, Union Saint-Ghislain Tertre-Hautrage
- Relegated: Boezinge, Fenixx BeigHum, Berlare, Zwarte Leeuw, Haasdonk, Turkse Rangers, Aische, Condruzien, Loyers, Jodoigne, Houffalize, Marloie Sport, Eupen 1963, Harre-Manhay
- Matches: 992
- Goals: 3,392 (3.42 per match)

The 2025–26 Belgian Division 3 was the tenth season of the division in its current format, placed at the fifth tier of football in Belgium. As in previous seasons, the division was split into four parallel series—two Flemish (VV A and VV B) and two francophone (ACFF A and ACFF B).

== Team changes ==
=== Out ===
==== Promoted to the 2025–26 Belgian Division 2 ====
- The four division champions: Mandel United (VV A), Londerzeel (VV B), Braine (ACFF A) and Richelle United (ACFF B).
- Promoted via the promotion play-offs: Diksmuinde-Oostende, Hamme, Kalken, Nijlen, Wetteren, Rotselaar, Flénu, Tilff and Sporting Bruxelles.

==== Relegated to the Belgian Provincial Leagues ====
- From VV A: Wielsbeke, Beerschot U23, Stekene and Wervik.
- From VV B: Lommel SK B, Betekom and Bevel.
- From ACFF A: Rebecq, Perwez and Belœil.
- From ACFF B: Gouvy, Hamoir and Oppagne-Wéris.

=== In ===
==== Relegated from the 2024–25 Belgian Division 2 ====
- Olsa Brakel, Voorde-Appelterre, Lille United, Pelt, Wezel, Verlaine, La Louvière Centre and Eupen U23.

==== Promoted from the Belgian Provincial Leagues ====
- VV: Huldenberg, Rumbeke, Wambeek Ternat, Boezinge, Beigem Humbeek, Berlare, Wilrijk, Elewijt, Turkse Rangers and Haasdonk.
- ACFF: Evelette-Jallet, Saint-Michel, FC Kosova Schaerbeek, Stade Mouscronnois, Messancy, Houffaloise and Momalloise.
- La Louvière U23 was promoted to increase the number of U23 teams at this level.

== Belgian Division 3 VV A ==
Locations of the 2025–26 Belgian Division 3 VV A teams

=== League table ===
Pos	Team	Pld	W	D	L	GF	GA	GD	Pts	Qualification or relegation
1	Overijse (C, P)	30	22	6	2	70	26	+44	72	Promotion to the 2026–27 Belgian Division 2
2	Voorde-Appelterre (O, P)	30	18	6	6	54	29	+25	60	Qualification for the Promotion play-offs VV
3	St-Denijs Sport	30	16	7	7	54	39	+15	55	Qualification for the Promotion play-offs VV
4	Rumbeke	30	15	10	5	68	34	+34	55	Qualification for the Promotion play-offs VV
5	Eendracht Aalst Lede (O, P)	30	15	9	6	54	28	+26	54	Qualification for the Promotion play-offs VV
6	Olsa Brakel	30	13	8	9	53	43	+10	47	
7	Lauwe	30	10	8	12	43	43	0	38	
8	Huldenberg	30	9	11	10	35	43	−8	38	
9	Wambeek Ternat	30	9	9	12	41	54	−13	36	
10	Drongen	30	9	9	12	49	48	+1	36	
11	Blankenberge	30	9	8	13	34	47	−13	35	
12	Elene Grotenberge	30	9	8	13	45	59	−14	35	
13	Erpe-Mere	30	10	3	17	36	49	−13	33	Qualification for the Relegation play-offs VV
14	Boezinge (R)	30	6	7	17	35	63	−28	25	Relegation to the 2026–27 Belgian Provincial Leagues
15	Fenixx BeigHum (R)	30	7	3	20	30	53	−23	24	Relegation to the 2026–27 Belgian Provincial Leagues
16	Berlare (R)	30	5	4	21	31	74	−43	19	Relegation to the 2026–27 Belgian Provincial Leagues

Updated to match(es) played on 26 April 2026. Source: RBFA
Rules for classification: 1) Points; 2) Matches won; 3) Goal difference; 4) Goals scored; 5) Away matches won; 6) Goal difference in away matches; 7) Away goals scored.
(C) Champions; (O) Play-off winners; (P) Promoted; (R) Relegated

=== Period champions ===
- First period: Tempo Overijse
- Second period: Tempo Overijse
- Third period: Tempo Overijse and Voorde-Appelterre

=== Results ===
Home \ Away	BER	B-H	BLA	BOE	BRA	DRO	EAL	E-G	E-M	HUL	LAU	OVE	RUM	STD	V-A	W-T
Berlare	—	2–1	1–2	2–0	1–3	1–4		0–0	1–2	1–2	3–2	1–4	2–5	1–4	1–3	1–0
Beigem Humbeek	2–1	—		4–0	1–2	1–3	1–3	4–1	0–2	1–2	0–5	1–2	1–2	0–1	2–3	1–1
Blankenberge	2–1	1–0	—	0–0	0–1	2–4	0–3	0–0	1–0	2–0	0–2	0–1	2–2	0–1	0–0	2–0
Boezinge	4–3	1–0	3–1	—	1–4	2–1	1–1	2–1	1–2	1–3	0–3		2–3	2–5	0–3	0–2
Olsa Brakel	4–0	1–1	2–2	1–1	—	0–2	0–2	2–0		4–0	3–1	2–2	2–1	5–3	0–2	3–3
Drongen	1–1	3–0	1–2	2–2	4–2	—	0–0	1–1	3–3	1–2	1–1	0–2	1–1	2–4	2–1	3–0
Eendracht Aalst Lede	3–1	1–1	1–1	2–1	3–0	2–1	—	2–1	4–1	3–0	0–0	1–2	0–1	3–3	0–2	2–2
Elene Grotenberge	2–1	1–3	3–2	3–1	1–1	3–2	1–3	—	1–0	0–2	4–2	4–3	3–2		1–1	1–4
Erpe-Mere	0–1	0–1	2–1	2–1	1–2	1–2	1–3	3–1	—	2–0	2–0	1–3	2–2	0–1	0–1	2–1
Huldenberg	1–1	2–0	0–1	1–1	2–0		0–1	3–3	2–1	—	3–1	1–1	1–1	0–1	2–2	1–1
Lauwe	3–0	1–0	2–1	2–2	0–0	2–2	1–0	4–1	1–2	2–2	—	1–2		1–3	0–0	2–1
Overijse	3–0	2–0	4–0	3–0	2–0	2–0	1–2	4–1	3–2	4–0	2–1	—	2–1	1–1	3–1	1–1
Rumbeke	4–1	5–1	4–0	1–0	3–1	3–1	1–1	0–0	1–1	1–1	4–0	0–1	—	4–0	7–0	2–2
St-Denijs Sport	0–0	2–0	2–3	4–0	1–1	3–1	1–1	2–2	3–0	2–1	1–2	0–3	1–1	—	2–1	2–0
Voorde-Appelterre	3–0	2–0	1–1	2–0	1–0	2–0	1–0	4–2	3–0	3–0	0–0	0–3	3–1	0–1	—	4–0
Wambeek Ternat	4–2	0–1	4–4	0–4	1–4	1–0	2–1	1–0	2–0	0–0	2–1	2–2	2–3	1–0		—

Updated to match(es) played on 19 April 2026. Source: RBFA
Legend: Blue = home team win; Yellow = draw; Red = away team win.

== Belgian Division 3 VV B ==
Locations of the 2025–26 Belgian Division 3 VV B teams

=== League table ===
Pos	Team	Pld	W	D	L	GF	GA	GD	Pts	Qualification or relegation
1	De Kempen (C, P)	30	21	3	6	66	35	+31	66	Promotion to the 2026–27 Belgian Division 2
2	Wilrijk (O, P)	30	16	8	6	55	41	+14	56	Qualification for the Promotion play-offs VV
3	Schoonbeek-Beverst	30	17	4	9	57	44	+13	55	Qualification for the Promotion play-offs VV
4	Wezel	30	15	10	5	58	26	+32	55	Qualification for the Promotion play-offs VV
5	Zepperen-Brustem	30	16	6	8	65	38	+27	54	Qualification for the Promotion play-offs VV
6	Geel	30	13	8	9	50	37	+13	47	
7	City Pirates	30	12	7	11	45	38	+7	43	
8	Sint-Lenaarts	30	11	9	10	59	50	+9	42	
9	Lille United	30	9	14	7	43	43	0	41	
10	Achel	30	11	7	12	38	37	+1	40	
11	Turnhout	30	11	4	15	64	59	+5	37	
12	Elewijt	30	10	7	13	46	49	−3	37	
13	Pelt	30	7	4	19	30	71	−41	25	Qualification for the Relegation play-offs VV
14	Zwarte Leeuw (R)	30	6	7	17	22	51	−29	25	Relegation to the 2026–27 Belgian Provincial Leagues
15	Haasdonk (R)	30	6	6	18	42	64	−22	24	Relegation to the 2026–27 Belgian Provincial Leagues
16	Turkse Rangers (Note: Turkse Rangers did not apply for a license to compete at this level next season and therefore will be relegated regardless of their finishing position.) (R)	30	5	4	21	26	83	−57	19	Relegation to the 2026–27 Belgian Provincial Leagues

Source: RBFA
Rules for classification: 1) Points; 2) Matches won; 3) Goal difference; 4) Goals scored; 5) Away matches won; 6) Goal difference in away matches; 7) Away goals scored.
(C) Champions; (O) Play-off winners; (P) Promoted; (R) Relegated

=== Period champions ===
- First period: De Kempen
- Second period: Schoonbeek-Beverst
- Third period: De Kempen

=== Results ===
Home \ Away	ACH	C-P	DEK	ELE	GEE	HAA	LIL	PEL	S-B	STL	TRA	TUR	WEZ	WIL	ZEP	ZWL
Achel	—	1–0	0–1	0–1	3–3	3–1	0–3		2–4	0–2	3–0	3–0	1–4	1–2	3–0	0–0
City Pirates	1–0	—	0–0	1–1	0–1	3–0	1–1	1–2	1–2	4–2	4–1	4–2	1–2		4–1	2–0
De Kempen	0–1	0–3	—		1–1	3–2	2–2	4–0	3–2	2–1	3–1	0–2	2–1	4–2	3–2	2–1
Elewijt	3–0	1–1	1–4	—	4–2	3–1	3–0	4–1	0–3	3–4	0–2	1–1	1–3	1–2	3–1	3–1
Geel	0–1	0–0	0–1	0–1	—	2–0	3–0	1–0	2–1	2–0	5–0	2–1	2–0	1–1		2–2
Haasdonk	1–0	2–1	2–3	1–1	3–1	—	0–0	1–1	1–2	2–2		3–2	1–1	0–2	1–1	0–1
Lille United	1–1	2–0	1–0	1–1	4–2	2–0	—	3–3	1–1	2–2	1–0	2–2	1–1	0–0	0–5	3–1
Pelt	1–1	1–0	1–3	3–2	2–0	2–2	0–3	—	0–3	1–2	1–3	2–0	0–3	1–4	1–2	0–1
Schoonbeek-Beverst	0–3	5–1	0–5	4–1	1–0	3–2	3–0	2–3	—	3–2	3–1	1–4		2–2	1–1	4–0
Sint-Lenaarts	1–1	0–1	2–3	1–0	3–3	4–0	2–1	5–1	3–0	—	4–1	3–0	0–0	2–2	2–3	0–0
Turkse Rangers	1–3	0–0	0–4	1–1	0–6	2–1	1–1	0–1	0–3	1–4	—	0–1	0–4	0–1	0–3	3–3
Turnhout	1–0	2–4	1–2	3–0	2–4	7–3	2–3	3–1	0–0		9–1	—	1–7	1–2	2–2	3–0
Wezel	1–3	1–1	2–0	3–1	0–0	2–0	0–0	3–0	3–0	2–2	3–0	5–1	—	2–1	2–2	1–1
Wilrijk	3–1	3–1	1–5	1–1	1–1	2–1	2–2	5–2	3–0	3–2	2–3	1–0	2–0	—	1–0	2–1
Zepperen-Brustem	2–2	4–0	3–1	3–1	1–2	7–1	2–1	4–0	0–2	2–1	3–0	2–1	0–1	1–1	—	3–1
Zwarte Leeuw	0–1	0–1	0–4	0–3	1–2	1–0		2–0	0–1	0–0	0–3	0–3	1–1	1–0	0–2	—

Updated to match(es) played on 19 April 2026. Source: RBFA
Legend: Blue = home team win; Yellow = draw; Red = away team win.

== Belgian Division 3 ACFF A ==
Locations of the 2025–26 Belgian Division 3 ACFF A teams

=== League table ===
Pos	Team	Pld	W	D	L	GF	GA	GD	Pts	Qualification or relegation
1	Stade Mouscronnois (C, P)	32	21	5	6	87	46	+41	68	Promotion to the 2026–27 Belgian Division 2
2	St-Ghislain Tertre Hautrage (O, P)	32	21	4	7	77	47	+30	67	Qualification for the Promotion play-offs ACFF
3	Arquet	32	19	5	8	68	49	+19	62	Qualification for the Promotion play-offs ACFF
4	Stade Everois	32	18	6	8	59	43	+16	60	Qualification for the Promotion play-offs ACFF
5	La Louvière Centre	32	18	5	9	71	69	+2	59	Qualification for the Promotion play-offs ACFF
6	Evelette-Jallet	32	15	8	9	84	63	+21	53	
7	Monceau	32	15	6	11	69	54	+15	51	
8	La Louvière U23	32	14	4	14	76	56	+20	46	
9	Biesme	32	14	2	16	71	58	+13	44	
10	Kosova Schaerbeek	32	12	7	13	56	62	−6	43	
11	Saint-Michel	32	11	6	15	50	55	−5	39	
12	Buzet	32	9	10	13	40	51	−11	37	
13	Ciney (O)	32	9	8	15	59	77	−18	35	Qualification for the Relegation play-offs ACFF
14	Aische (R)	32	8	5	19	51	83	−32	29	Relegation to the 2026–27 Belgian Provincial Leagues
15	Condruzien (R)	32	8	4	20	44	72	−28	28	Relegation to the 2026–27 Belgian Provincial Leagues
16	Loyers (R)	32	7	7	18	49	83	−34	28	Relegation to the 2026–27 Belgian Provincial Leagues
17	Jodoigne (R)	32	5	4	23	33	76	−43	19	Relegation to the 2026–27 Belgian Provincial Leagues

Source: RBFA
Rules for classification: 1) Points; 2) Matches won; 3) Goal difference; 4) Goals scored; 5) Away matches won; 6) Goal difference in away matches; 7) Away goals scored.
(C) Champions; (O) Play-off winners; (P) Promoted; (R) Relegated

=== Period champions ===
- First period: St-Ghislain Tertre Hautrage
- Second period: Stade Mouscronnois
- Third period: Stade Everois

=== Results ===
Home \ Away	AIS	ARQ	BIE	BUZ	CIN	CON	E-J	EVE	JOD	KOS	LLC	LLV	LOY	MON	MOU	STM	STG
Aische	—	2–3	2–5	4–2	3–0	2–1	1–5	1–1	1–0	1–1	2–3	4–2	2–0	1–5	0–1	1–1	
Arquet	2–0	—	1–3	2–0		2–0	1–1	1–2	2–4	3–1	3–3	3–2	0–0	1–3	1–1		0–3
Biesme	6–1	0–2	—		3–1	3–3	3–4	3–0	2–1	1–1	2–3	1–3	1–0	1–2	0–3	3–0	5–1
Buzet	2–1	2–4	2–0	—	2–0	1–2	0–0	1–0	0–0	1–1	2–4		0–0	1–3	0–2	3–0	1–1
Ciney	3–3	1–3	2–3	2–1	—	2–2	1–1	1–2	2–0	7–2	3–2	1–0	2–2	2–2	1–4		2–3
Condruzien	3–1	3–4	1–2	5–0	1–2	—	2–0	0–1	2–2	1–1		0–4	0–2	2–3	2–1	0–4	1–2
Evelette-Jallet	6–3	0–1	4–3	1–1	3–3		—	2–0	4–2	1–2	2–3	2–1	3–3	3–0	6–4	2–2	2–2
Stade Everois	2–0		1–0	1–2	4–3	4–1	3–4	—	1–1	2–1		1–1	6–4	1–1	2–1	2–1	0–2
Jodoigne	1–2	1–6	1–6	0–3	2–3	2–1			—	1–2	0–1	1–4	3–2	0–3	1–2	2–1	2–4
Kosova Schaerbeek	2–1	1–2	3–2	1–1	2–1	2–0	2–1	0–0	1–1	—	5–1	1–2	1–0	1–2		1–0	2–4
La Louvière Centre		0–2	2–1	2–1	3–2	2–1	3–2		5–0	2–1	—	3–1	6–4	1–1	1–4	4–2	4–0
La Louvière U23	4–1	4–2	4–2	3–3	1–3	6–0	0–3	1–0	1–0		5–0	—	8–0	1–2	1–4	1–3	0–2
Loyers		0–1	2–1	1–2	3–3	1–2	0–2	1–3	2–0	3–1	3–3	4–4	—	3–2	2–3	2–1	1–3
Monceau	3–1	1–2		1–1	1–2	0–1	4–6	1–2	0–2	1–5	2–3	2–2	2–0	—	4–0	2–0	3–0
Stade Mouscronnois	4–0	3–1	1–0	4–2	8–0	1–2	2–0	2–1	2–1	6–4	2–2	0–3	5–0	2–2	—	1–1	2–2
Saint-Michel	4–0	1–4	0–4	1–1	1–1	1–0	4–0	2–3	2–0	2–3	2–1	4–2		0–5	0–2	—	2–1
St-Ghislain Tertre Hautrage	6–1	0–2	2–1	3–0	4–0	3–1	3–2	1–2	3–0	4–2	1–0	2–1	6–0		1–6	2–0	—

Updated to match(es) played on 12 April 2026. Source: RBFA
Legend: Blue = home team win; Yellow = draw; Red = away team win.

== Belgian Division 3 ACFF B ==
Locations of the 2025–26 Belgian Division 3 ACFF B teams

=== League table ===
Pos	Team	Pld	W	D	L	GF	GA	GD	Pts	Qualification or relegation
1	Eupen U23 (C, P)	30	22	3	5	91	42	+49	69	Promotion to the 2026–27 Belgian Division 2
2	Verlaine	30	18	8	4	66	32	+34	62	Qualification for the Promotion play-offs ACFF
3	Momalloise	30	16	8	6	64	39	+25	56	Qualification for the Promotion play-offs ACFF
4	Stade Waremmien	30	16	4	10	59	46	+13	52	Qualification for the Promotion play-offs ACFF
5	Du Geer (Note: As Geer and Aubel finished tied on points and matches won, a test-match was organized to determine which of both teams would take the final spot in the Promotion play-offs ACFF. The match will be played at a neutral venue, the Stade de la Cité de l'Oie in Visé.)	30	13	7	10	51	46	+5	46	Test-match to qualify for the Promotion play-offs ACFF
6	Aubel	30	13	7	10	51	54	−3	46	Test-match to qualify for the Promotion play-offs ACFF
7	Sprimont	30	12	7	11	54	52	+2	43	
8	Elsautoise	30	12	6	12	60	57	+3	42	
9	Meix-dt-Virton	30	10	10	10	48	50	−2	40	
10	Libramontois	30	11	5	14	43	50	−7	38	
11	Messancy	30	9	10	11	49	51	−2	37	
12	Mormont	30	9	9	12	44	51	−7	36	
13	Harre-Manhay	30	10	4	16	42	59	−17	34	Qualification for the Relegation play-offs ACFF
14	Houffalize (R)	30	6	7	17	36	61	−25	25	Relegation to the 2026–27 Belgian Provincial Leagues
15	Marloie Sport (R)	30	7	3	20	48	78	−30	24	Relegation to the 2026–27 Belgian Provincial Leagues
16	Eupen 1963 (R)	30	4	6	20	42	80	−38	18	Relegation to the 2026–27 Belgian Provincial Leagues

Source: RBFA
Rules for classification: 1) Points; 2) Matches won; 3) Goal difference; 4) Goals scored; 5) Away matches won; 6) Goal difference in away matches; 7) Away goals scored.
(C) Champions; (P) Promoted; (R) Relegated

=== Period champions ===
- First period: Momalloise
- Second period: Eupen U23
- Third period: Eupen U23

=== Results ===
Home \ Away	AUB	DUG	ELS	EPN	EUP	HAR	HOU	LIB	MAR	MEI	MES	MOM	MOR	SPR	VER	WAR
Aubel	—	1–1	2–2	3–1	2–1	0–3	3–2	1–2	2–1	1–0	1–1	1–4	1–0	1–1	3–3	4–2
Du Geer	4–0	—	3–1	2–1	2–1	3–1	3–0	2–2	4–1	1–3	1–1	1–2	3–1	3–0	2–1	0–4
Elsautoise	1–2	3–1	—	0–1	5–2	2–1	3–1	1–2	2–0	2–4	1–1	1–1	1–1	5–2	0–1	5–3
Eupen U23	4–2	3–0	1–2	—	2–1	7–0	0–1	3–2	3–1	2–1	2–0	6–1	2–3	3–0	2–2	2–0
Eupen 1963	2–1	0–2	1–4	0–6	—	1–1	3–3	1–2	3–4	3–2	1–5	1–0	1–3	1–2	4–3	1–2
Harre-Manhay	3–2	3–0	2–1	2–4	1–0	—	0–5	2–0	2–2	2–2	4–0	1–4	0–3	1–3	2–3	1–2
Houffalize	3–2	0–1	1–3	0–1	1–1	1–0	—	3–0	1–3	2–4	0–2	2–2	1–0	1–2	0–1	0–1
Libramontois	0–2	1–0	1–2	1–3	4–1	1–2	1–0	—	2–1	1–2	1–1	2–3	2–2	3–2	2–2	2–0
Marloie Sport	1–1	0–1	2–2	1–3	5–2	2–3	2–0	1–2	—	0–2	3–2	2–3	2–0	0–3	0–3	2–3
Meix-dt-Virton	1–0	3–3	1–2	1–2	1–1	2–1	1–1	1–0	2–4	—	3–5	2–2	0–0	3–1	1–0	1–2
Messancy	1–1	1–1	3–3	2–3	0–0	2–1	0–0	4–1	4–1	0–0	—	2–1	1–3	1–1	0–2	3–3
Momalloise	3–0	1–1	4–1	2–3	1–0	2–0	0–0	2–2	7–0	4–0	2–0	—	3–2	0–1	1–1	0–2
Mormont	1–3	3–1	1–1	2–2	2–4	2–2	3–0	1–3	3–0	0–0	1–0	0–1	—	3–3	0–3	1–0
Sprimont	1–2	2–1	1–2	3–5	4–0	3–1	4–2	3–2	3–2	3–3	2–3	1–1	1–1	—	0–0	3–1
Verlaine	2–0	4–1	3–1	5–1	3–2	2–0	2–2	1–0	2–1	0–1	2–0	1–1	4–0	0–0	—	1–0
Stade Waremmien	0–1	1–1	4–5	2–2	3–0	1–0	3–0	1–0	4–3	1–1	2–1	2–4	3–0	0–2	4–1	—

Updated to match(es) played on 12 April 2026. Source: RBFA
Legend: Blue = home team win; Yellow = draw; Red = away team win.

== Play-offs ==
=== Promotion play-offs ===
==== VV ====
The promotion play-offs are contested by eight teams, from each division four teams: the team finishing second overall plus the three period champions. In case one or more periods are won by the eventual champion (already promoted) or by the same club, then the best ranked team that has not already qualified will take its place. Furthermore, any team not eligible (for instance due to not receiving a licence) will not be eligible to take place and the next best-ranked team will take its spot.

Qualified teams:

- Eendracht Aalst Lede (3rd highest place eligible finisher (5th) not directly qualified from division VV A)
- Rumbeke (2nd highest place eligible finisher (4th) not directly qualified from division VV A)
- Schoonbeek-Beverst (winner second period in VV B)
- St-Denijs Sport (highest place eligible finisher (3rd) not directly qualified from division VV A)
- Voorde-Appelterre (runner-up division VV A)
- Wezel (highest place eligible finisher (4th) not directly qualified from division VV B)
- Wilrijk (runner-up division VV B)
- Zepperen-Brustem (2nd highest place eligible finisher (5th) not directly qualified from division VV B)

The eight teams are playing for three extra promotion spots, there was no seeding during the draw. No final will be played as both semi-final winners will be promoted, instead a consolation 3rd-place match will determine the third promoted team

Round 1	Round 2
3 May 2026
Zepperen-Brustem (p)	1 (3)
Rumbeke	1 (1)	10 May 2026
Eendracht Aalst Lede	1
3 May 2026	Zepperen-Brustem	0
Eendracht Aalst Lede (a.e.t.)	2
Wezel	1
1 May 2026
Wilrijk	5
Schoonbeek-Beverst	1	9 May 2026
Wilrijk	1	Placing 3rd/4th
3 May 2026	Voorde-Appelterre	0	14 May 2026
Voorde-Appelterre	3	Zepperen-Brustem	1
St-Denijs Sport	1	Voorde-Appelterre	4

===== Round 1 =====
3 May 2026
15:00 CEST

Zepperen-Brustem	1–1 (a.e.t.)	Rumbeke
Winkels 89'	Report	Notebaert 32' (pen.)
Penalties
Swerten (penalty scored); Degeling (penalty scored); Robin (penalty scored)	3–1	(penalty scored) Notebaert; (penalty missed) Tyvaert; (penalty missed) Moyaert; (penalty missed) Defevere

Het Dekken, Zepperen
Referee: Janis Serckx

3 May 2026
15:00 CEST

Eendracht Aalst Lede	2–1 (a.e.t.)	Wezel
Vandamme 87'; Van Den Eeckhout 97'	Report	Mols 5'

Pierre Cornelisstadion, Aalst
Referee: Kenneth Verhelle

1 May 2026
19:00 CEST

Wilrijk	5–1	Schoonbeek-Beverst
De Witte 10'; Borahsasar 15', 45', 70'; Lambreghts 50'	Report	Aabbou 22'

Sportcomplex Ter Beke, Wilrijk
Referee: Isaak Huyghe

3 May 2026
15:00 CEST

Voorde-Appelterre	3–1	St-Denijs Sport
Epolo 42' (pen.); Figys 75', 80'	Report	Petereyns 89'

Molenveld, Appelterre-Eichem
Referee: Simon Haegeman

===== Round 2 =====
9 May 2026
20:00 CEST

Wilrijk	1–0	Voorde-Appelterre
Kaddour 2'	Report

Sportcomplex Ter Beke, Wilrijk
Referee: Jan Krieken

10 May 2026
15:00 CEST

Eendracht Aalst Lede	1–0	Zepperen-Brustem
Triest 53'	Report

Pierre Cornelisstadion, Aalst (Note: Originally, Zepperen-Brustem was drawn to play at home. For safety reasons it was decided to cede the home advantage.)

Wilrijk and Eendracht Aalst Lede were promoted to the 2026–27 Belgian Division 2, Voorde-Appelterre and Zepperen-Brustem face off in the 3rd-place match to see who gets the third promotion spot.

===== Placing 3rd/4th =====
14 May 2026
15:00 CEST

Zepperen-Brustem	1–4	Voorde-Appelterre
Degeling 13'	Report	Epolo 7', 44', 57' (pen.); Barasaba 48'

Het Dekken, Zepperen
Referee: Mohamed Wahhabi

Voorde-Appelterre was promoted to the 2026–27 Belgian Division 2 together with both semi-final winners.

==== FFA ====
The promotion play-offs are contested by eight teams, from each division four teams: the team finishing second overall plus the three period champions. In case one or more periods are won by the eventual champion (already promoted) or by the same club, then the best ranked team that has not already qualified will take its place. Furthermore, any team not eligible (for instance due to not receiving a licence) will not be eligible to take place and the next best-ranked team will take its spot.

Due to the fact that Geer and Aubel finished tied on points and number of matches won, these teams played a test-match to determine the eight and final participant of the promotion play-offs.

Test-match
Aubel (p)	0 (3)
Geer	0 (1)

Round 1
La Louvière Centre	4
Waremme	2
Aubel	1
Momalle	4
Arquet	0
Saint-Ghislain Tertre Hautrage	3
Verlaine	4
Stade Everois	2

Round 2
La Louvière Centre	1
Momalle	2
Saint-Ghislain Tertre Hautrage	3
Verlaine	2

Round 3
Momalle	1
Saint-Ghislain Tertre Hautrage	2
Placing 3rd/4th
Verlaine	1
La Louvière Centre	3

===== Test-match =====
29 April 2025
20:00 CEST

Aubel	0–0 (a.e.t.)	Geer
	Report
Penalties
Halleux (penalty scored); Hansen (penalty scored); Levaux (penalty scored)	3–1	(penalty missed) Bajo; (penalty missed) Laruelle; (penalty scored) Georges; (penalty missed) Abraham

Stade de la Cité de l'Oie, Visé

===== Round 1 =====
3 May 2026
15:00 CEST

Aubel	1–4	Momalle
Hansen 90' (pen.)	Report	Spitaels 10', 13', 65'; Damarios 66'

Stade Jean-Marie Doome, Aubel
Referee: Vahé Eric Mathieu

3 May 2026
15:00 CEST

La Louvière Centre	4–2	Waremme
Ouali 30' (pen.); Sob Fefen 44', 64'; Kouka 85'	Report	Bustin 45', 87'

Stade R. Dienne, Haine-Saint-Pierre
Referee: Franck Tanko

1 May 2026
19:00 CEST

Arquet	0–3	Saint-Ghislain Tertre Hautrage
	Report	Verstraeten 44', 78'; Renquin 89' (pen.)

Terrain Arquet - Fonds De Bouge, Vedrin
Referee: Leandro Ledda

3 May 2026
15:00 CEST

Verlaine	4–2	Stade Everois
Asensio 32'; Jamar 36'; Sima 55'; Saidi 79'	Report	Boujour 59'; Mbenti 76'

Stade Des Six Bonniers, Verlaine
Referee: Clement Dubuc

===== Round 2 =====
10 May 2026
15:00 CEST

La Louvière Centre	1–2	Momalle
Sob Fefen	Report	El Farsi; Amrous

Stade R. Dienne, Haine-Saint-Pierre
Referee: Nicolas Bullens

10 May 2026
15:00 CEST

Saint-Ghislain Tertre Hautrage	3–2	Verlaine
Toure 11'; Jean-Philippe 66'; Verstraeten 70'	Report	Basha 52'; Jamar 88'

Stade St Lô, Saint-Ghislain
Referee: Arnaud Soors

===== Placing 1st/2nd =====
17 May 2026
15:00 CEST

Momalle	1–2	Saint-Ghislain Tertre Hautrage
Gillard 68'	Report	Henry 14'; El Araichi 26'

Complexe Rue Des Béguines Terrain 1, Momalle
Referee: Vahé Eric Mathieu

Saint-Ghislain Tertre Hautrage was promoted to the 2026–27 Belgian Division 2.

===== Placing 3rd/4th =====
17 May 2026
15:30 CEST

Verlaine	1–3	La Louvière Centre
Jamar 89' (pen.)	Report	Ouali 80', 84'; Kouka 90'

Stade Des Six Bonniers, Verlaine
Referee: Jurgen Meyvisch

This match was played to determine the order in case extra places become available.

=== Relegation play-off ===
==== VV ====
The two teams finishing 13th play each other. Going into the match, it was already near certain that both clubs would be spared, as none of the VV teams had been relegated from the 2025–26 Challenger Pro League, but rules stipulate that the match needed to be played to determine the order in case an extra relegation was necessary.

3 May 2026
15:00 CEST

Erpe-Mere	2–0	Pelt
Movoto 89', 90'	Report

Steenberg, Erpe-Mere
Referee: Yuri Depuydt

==== FFA ====
The two teams finishing 13th play each other. The winner of the match would remain in Division 3. The loser would most likely be relegated, although legal procedures were still ongoing by RWDM to dispute their relegation from the 2025–26 Challenger Pro League, and in case they would not be relegated, then the loser of this match would be saved as well.

3 May 2026
15:00 CEST

Harre-Manhay	1–2	Ciney
Rasquin 22'	Report	Bruckner 75'; Vanheukelom 81' (o.g.)

Terrain 1, Manhay
Referee: Amaury Requier
