= Erpe-Mere United =

Belgian football club

- Full name: Erpe-Mere United
- Founded: 1949 (foundation); 1950 (matricule number assigned); Matricule number 5343
- Ground: Lindekouter, 9420 Bambrugge
- Capacity: 1500
- President: Stefan Gabriëls
- Head coach: Ives Cordier
- League: Belgian Division 3
- 2025–26: Belgian Division 3 VV A, 13th of 16
- Website: https://www.em-united.be/
Home colours

Erpe-Mere United is a Belgian association football club based in Bambrugge, East Flanders. The club has matricule number 5343 and the club's colours are orange and black. They currently play in Belgian Division 3. They play their home games at the Complex Lindekouter in Bambrugge.

== History ==
The club was founded on 16 August 1949 as RC Bambrugge and joined the Royal Belgian Football Association on 24 June 1950, with matricule number 5343 being assigned to the team. Bambrugge played for decades in the provisional leagues, but climbed steadily, and remained at the top of the Second Provincial division for years. They were the winners of their series in 2009, resulting in promotion to the highest provincial level, the first club ever from Erpe-Mere to achieve this.

== Merger plans ==
During the 2010s, plans were made for the four remaining clubs from Erpe-Mere (SK Aaigem, KRC Bambrugge, KFC Olympic Burst and FC Mere) to merge. Eventually, in 2021 KRC Bambrugge and FC Mere merged to form Erpe-Mere United from the 2021–2022 season on, with Aaigem and Burst still to be integrated later on.

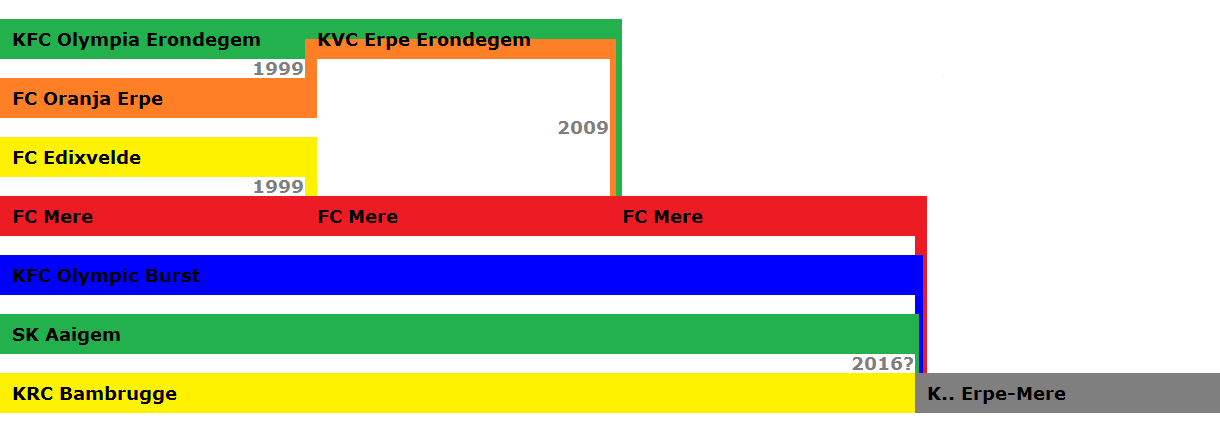
Merger progress
