= Eendracht Elene Grotenberge =

Belgian football club

- Full name: Eendracht Elene Grotenberge
- Founded: 1941 (foundation); 2014 (merger); Matricule number 3861
- Ground: Breivelde, 9620 Zottegem
- President: Sven Monsaert
- Head coach: Bart De Durpel
- League: Belgian Division 3
- 2025–26: Belgian Division 3 VV A, 12th of 16
- Website: eendrachtelenegrotenberge.be
Home colours	Away colours

Eendracht Elene Grotenberge is a Belgian association football club based in Zottegem, East Flanders. The club has matricule number 3861 and the club's colors are blue and white. They currently play in the Belgian Division 3, and play their home games at Breivelde in Zottegem.

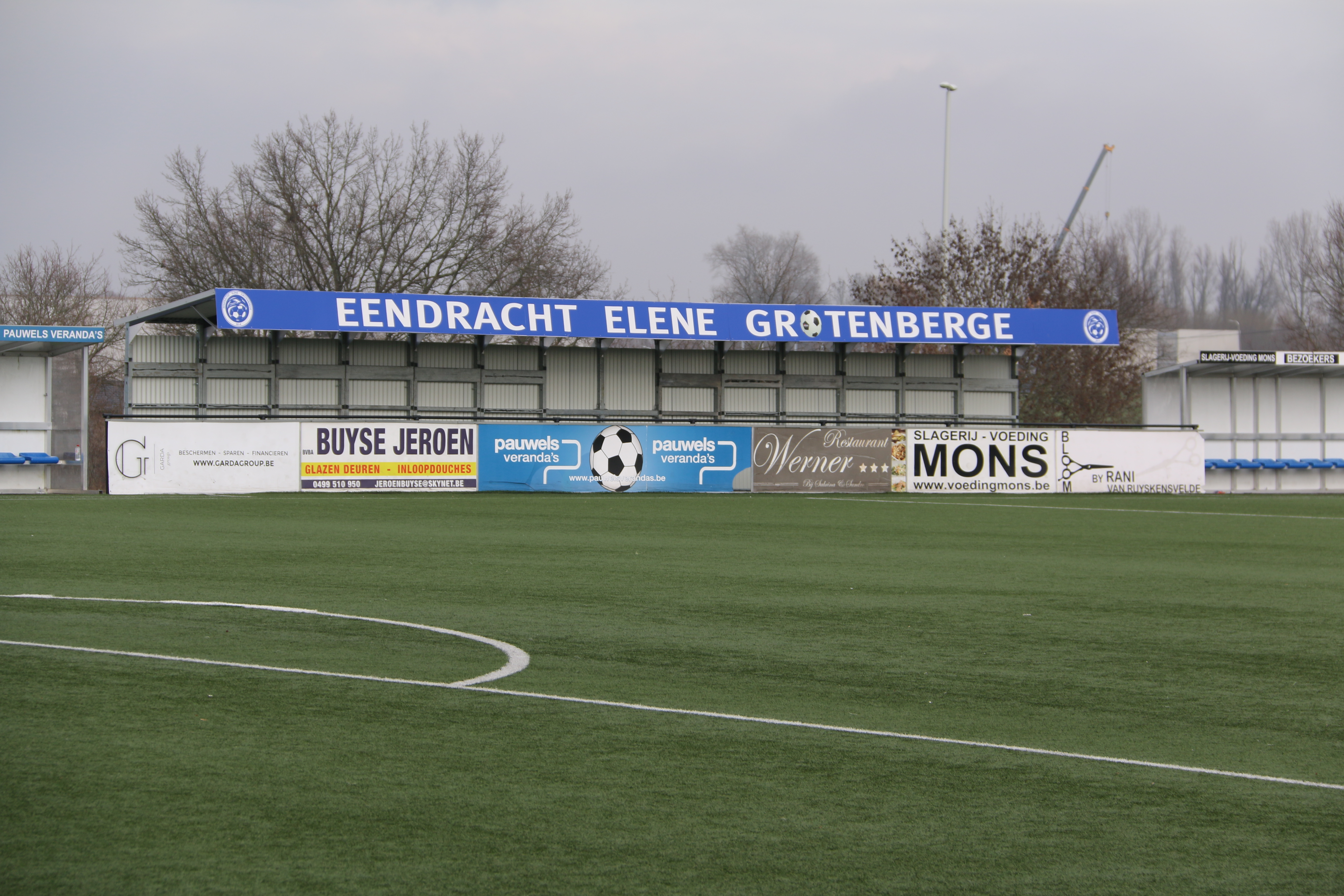
Eendracht Elene-Grotenberge

== History ==
The club was created in 2014 as a merger of two clubs:

1. Eendracht Grotenberge: founded in 1941 and assigned matricule 3861 after joining the Belgian FA in 1943. Highlights include promotion to the third provincial division in 1991 via playoffs and becoming champions and thus promoting to the second provincial division in 1995. The club then dropped back to the third provincial division in 1996 and the fourth provincial division in 2013
2. Eendracht Elene: founded in 1972, but only played in unofficial amateur leagues before finally joining the Belgian FA in 2004 receiving matricule 9450. Became champions and promoted to third provincial division in 2006, followed by another promotion in 2011.

After the merger, the club retained the matricule 3861 and started with two teams, the A-squad in the second provincial division and the B-squad in the fourth provincial division. In 2015 the A-squad became champions and promoted to the first provincial division while the B-squad also gained promotion (to the third provincial division) after playoffs. In 2022, the A-squad achieved promotion to the Belgian Division 3, which meant the club would for the first time play at the national level.

In 2023, the club reached the seventh round of the 2023–24 Belgian Cup, where it was drawn away to Belgian Pro League team Oud-Heverlee Leuven.

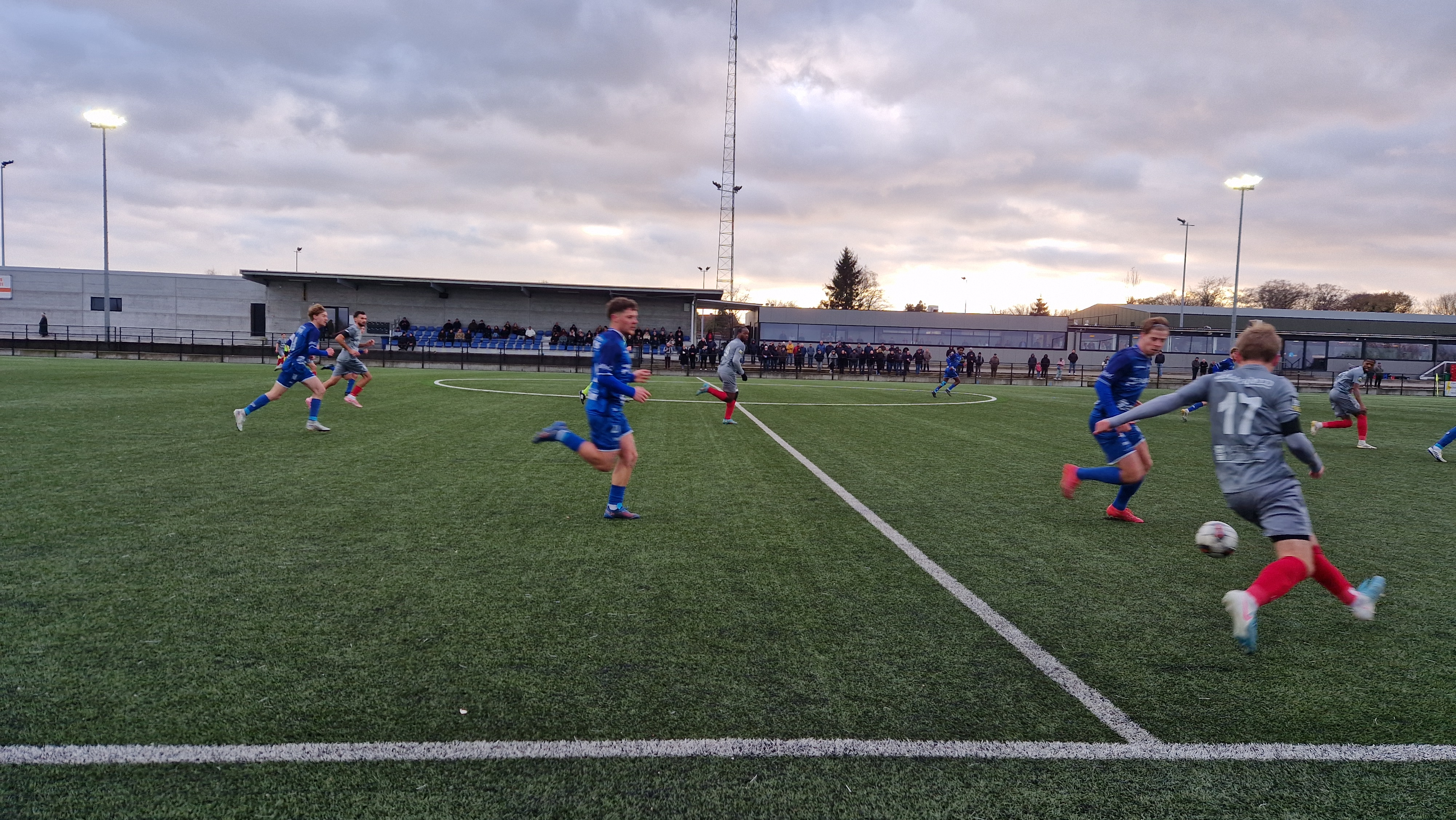
2025 home game against Voorde-Appelterre
