= List of Belgian football transfers summer 2018 =

This is a list of Belgian football transfers for the 2018 summer transfer window. Only transfers involving a team from the professional divisions are listed, including the 16 teams in the Belgian First Division A and the 8 teams playing in the Belgian First Division B.

The summer transfer window will open on 1 July 2018, although several transfers will be announced prior to that date. Players without a club may join one at any time, either during or between transfer windows. The transfer window ends on 1 September 2018, although a few completed transfers could still be announced a few days later.

== Sorted by date ==
=== December 2017 ===
Date	Name	Moving from	Moving to	Fee	Note
4 December 2017	Hassane Bandé	Mechelen	Ajax	€9 000 000	

=== January 2018 ===
Date	Name	Moving from	Moving to	Fee	Note
22 January 2018	Benito Raman	Standard Liège	Fortuna Düsseldorf	Loan Extended	(Note: Raman was already on loan from Standard Liège to Fortuna Düsseldorf during the 2016-17 season. The loan was extended for another season.)

=== February 2018 ===
Date	Name	Moving from	Moving to	Fee	Note
8 February 2018	Jari De Busser	Lierse	Gent	Undisclosed	
26 February 2018	Luca Napoleone	Heist	Excel Mouscron	Undisclosed	

=== March 2018 ===
Date	Name	Moving from	Moving to	Fee	Note
5 March 2018	Wouter Scheelen	Lommel	Bocholt	Undisclosed	
12 March 2018	Jaric Schaessens	Beerschot Wilrijk	Rupel Boom	Undisclosed	
18 March 2018	Mohamed Ofkir	Lokeren	Sandefjord	Undisclosed	
20 March 2018	Hernán Losada	Beerschot Wilrijk	Free Agent	Retired	
20 March 2018	Benito Raman	Standard Liège	Fortuna Düsseldorf	Undisclosed	(Note: Raman was already on loan from Standard Liège to Fortuna Düsseldorf during the 2016-17 season and the loan had only recently been extended until June 2019. Düsseldorf now opted to pay for the full transfer of Raman.)
20 March 2018	Sambou Yatabaré	Werder Bremen	Antwerp	Undisclosed	(Note: Yatabaré was already on loan from Werder Bremen to Antwerp during the 2017-18 season. Antwerp activated the clause to make the transfer permanent.)
29 March 2018	Mamadou Bagayoko	OH Leuven	Mechelen	Undisclosed	(Note: Bagayoko was already on loan from OH Leuven to Mechelen since the winter 2017–18 transfer window and all parties now agreed to make the transfer permanent.)

=== April 2018 ===
Date	Name	Moving from	Moving to	Fee	Note
3 April 2018	Marco Bürki	Young Boys	Zulte Waregem	Undisclosed	
4 April 2018	David Rozehnal	Oostende	Free Agent	Retired	
5 April 2018	Moustapha Bayal Sall	Antwerp	Free Agent	Released	
9 April 2018	Erdin Demir	Waasland-Beveren	Zulte Waregem	Undisclosed	
9 April 2018	Hicham Faik	Excelsior	Zulte Waregem	Undisclosed	
12 April 2018	Paul Keita	Mezőkövesd	Waasland-Beveren	Undisclosed	
12 April 2018	Arjan Swinkels	Beerschot Wilrijk	Mechelen	Undisclosed	
14 April 2018	Yevhen Makarenko	Kortrijk	Anderlecht	Undisclosed	
14 April 2018	Trezeguet	Anderlecht	Kasımpaşa	€2 000 000	(Note: Trezeguet was already on loan from Anderlecht to Kasımpaşa since the summer 2017 transfer window. Kasımpaşa activated the clause to make the move permanent.)
16 April 2018	Kristal Abazaj	Skënderbeu Korçë	Anderlecht	€750 000	
16 April 2018	Giel Deferm	Lommel	Thes Sport	Free	
16 April 2018	Emeric Dudouit	Tubize	Beerschot Wilrijk	Undisclosed	
18 April 2018	Yan De Maeyer	Beerschot Wilrijk	Rupel Boom	Undisclosed	(Note: De Maeyer was on loan from Beerschot Wilrijk to Oosterzonen Oosterwijk during the 2017–18 season. The loan ended and De Maeyer was now sold to Rupel Boom.)
19 April 2018	Jarno De Smet	Lommel	Kortrijk	Undisclosed	
19 April 2018	François Maistriaux	Couvin-Mariembourg	Charleroi	Undisclosed	
20 April 2018	Matisse Didden	Patro Eisden Maasmechelen	Genk	Undisclosed	
20 April 2018	Andile Jali	Oostende	Free Agent	Released	
20 April 2018	Milan Massop	Excelsior	Waasland-Beveren	Undisclosed	
20 April 2018	Leandro Pereira	Club Brugge	Chapecoense	Loan	(Note: Pereira was on loan from Club Brugge to Sport Recife since the winter 2017–18 transfer window. The loan ended and Pereira was now loaned to Chapecoense.)
22 April 2018	Ben Santermans	Den Bosch	Lommel	Undisclosed	(Note: Santermans was already on loan from Den Bosch to Lommel since the winter 2017–18 transfer window. All parties agreed to make the transfer permanent.)
25 April 2018	Elias Cobbaut	Mechelen	Anderlecht	€3 000 000	
25 April 2018	Joran Triest	Lokeren	Hamme	Undisclosed	
26 April 2018	Djihad Bizimana	APR	Waasland-Beveren	Undisclosed	
28 April 2018	Bram Castro	Heracles	Mechelen	Undisclosed	
29 April 2018	Benjamin De Ceulaer	Westerlo	Eendracht Termien	Released	
30 April 2018	Jordi Maus	Lommel	Oosterzonen Oosterwijk	Undisclosed	
30 April 2018	Davy Roef	Anderlecht	Waasland-Beveren	Loan Extended	(Note: Roef was already on loan from Anderlecht to Waasland-Beveren during the 2016–17 season. The loan was extended for another season.)
30 April 2018	Nikola Storm	Club Brugge	Mechelen	Undisclosed	(Note: Storm was on loan from Club Brugge to OH Leuven since the winter 2016-17 transfer window. The loan ended and Storm was sold to Mechelen.)
30 April 2018	Dani Wilms	Mechelen	Beerschot Wilrijk	Undisclosed	

=== May 2018 ===
Date	Name	Moving from	Moving to	Fee	Note
2 May 2018	Guillaume De Schryver	Cercle Brugge	Westerlo	Undisclosed	
4 May 2018	Davy Brouwers	Roeselare	Thes Sport	Undisclosed	
8 May 2018	Konstantinos Laifis	Olympiacos	Standard Liège	Undisclosed	(Note: Laifis was already on loan from Olympiacos to Standard Liège since the summer 2016 transfer window. Standard Liège activated a clause in the contract to make the transfer permanent.)
8 May 2018	Dieumerci Ndongala	Standard Liège	Genk	Undisclosed	(Note: Ndongala was already on loan from Standard Liège to Genk since the summer 2017 transfer window. All parties agreed to make the transfer permanent.)
9 May 2018	Lucas Damblon	Sint-Truiden	Rupel Boom	Undisclosed	(Note: Damblon was on loan from Sint-Truiden to RWDM47 during the 2017–18 season. The loan ended and Damblon was now sold to Rupel Boom.)
9 May 2018	Alexis Gamboa	Santos de Guápiles	Waasland-Beveren	Undisclosed	
9 May 2018	Andreas Suederick	OH Leuven	Pepingen-Halle	Free	
9 May 2018	Axel Swerten	Lommel	Patro Eisden Maasmechelen	Undisclosed	(Note: Swerten was on loan from Lommel to Tienen during the second half of the 2017–18 season. The loan ended and Swerten was sold to Patro Eisden Maasmechelen.)
14 May 2018	Jakub Piotrowski	Pogoń Szczecin	Genk	Undisclosed	
14 May 2018	Ivo Rodrigues	Porto	Antwerp	Undisclosed	(Note: Rodrigues was already on loan from Porto to Antwerp since the summer 2017 transfer window. All parties agreed to make the transfer permanent.)
14 May 2018	Uroš Vitas	Mechelen	Free Agent	Contract Terminated	
15 May 2018	Youcef Attal	Paradou	Kortrijk	Undisclosed	(Note: Attal was already on loan from Paradou to Kortrijk, Kortrijk activated the claude to make the transfer permanent.)
15 May 2018	Ishak Belfodil	Standard Liège	TSG 1899 Hoffenheim	Undisclosed	(Note: Belfodil was on loan from Standard Liège to Werder Bremen since the summer 2017 transfer window. The loan ended and Belfodil was sold to Hoffenheim.)
15 May 2018	Igor de Camargo	APOEL	Mechelen	Undisclosed	
15 May 2018	Sindrit Guri	Kukësi	Oostende	€710 000	
15 May 2018	Oscar Threlkeld	Plymouth Argyle	Waasland-Beveren	Undisclosed	
15 May 2018	Mike Vanhamel	Oostende	Beerschot Wilrijk	Undisclosed	
16 May 2018	Quentin Laurent	Tubize	Châtelet	Undisclosed	
16 May 2018	Lamine Ndao	Quevilly-Rouen	Waasland-Beveren	Undisclosed	
17 May 2018	Laurent Lemoine	Club Brugge	Mechelen	Undisclosed	(Note: Lemoine was on loan from Club Brugge to Roeselare since the summer 2017 transfer window. The loan ended and Lemoine was sold to Mechelen.)
18 May 2018	Jean Butez	Lille	Excel Mouscron	Free	(Note: Butez was already on loan from Lille to Excel Mouscron during the 2016–17 season. The loan ended and the contract of Butez at Lille was annulled, allowing Butez to move to Excel Mouscron as a free player.)
18 May 2018	Mégan Laurent	Lierse	Eupen	Free	
20 May 2018	Loris Brogno	Sparta Rotterdam	Beerschot Wilrijk	Undisclosed	
21 May 2018	Aleksandar Vukotić	Krupa	Waasland-Beveren	Undisclosed	
22 May 2018	Simon Bammens	Olympia Wijgmaal	Westerlo	Undisclosed	
22 May 2018	Pierre Bourdin	Lierse	Beerschot Wilrijk	Free	
22 May 2018	Sebastiaan De Wilde	Eindhoven	Lommel	Undisclosed	
22 May 2018	Aristote Nkaka	Oostende	Anderlecht	Undisclosed	
22 May 2018	Aristote Nkaka	Anderlecht	Oostende	Loan	
22 May 2018	Mickaël Tirpan	Eupen	Lokeren	Undisclosed	
22 May 2018	Lukas Van Eenoo	Kortrijk	Westerlo	Undisclosed	(Note: Van Eenoo was already on loan from Kortrijk to Westerlo since the winter 2017-18 transfer window. All parties agreed to make the transfer permanent.)
23 May 2018	Luka Adžić	Red Star Belgrade	Anderlecht	Undisclosed	
23 May 2018	Antonio Milić	Oostende	Anderlecht	Undisclosed	
23 May 2018	Knowledge Musona	Oostende	Anderlecht	Undisclosed	
23 May 2018	Kenny Saief	Gent	Anderlecht	Undisclosed	(Note: Saief was already on loan from Gent to Anderlecht since the winter 2017–18 transfer window. Anderlecht activated the clause to make the move permanent.)
23 May 2018	Uroš Spajić	Anderlecht	Krasnodar	Undisclosed	
24 May 2018	Daan Heymans	Westerlo	Waasland-Beveren	Undisclosed	
24 May 2018	Stallone Limbombe	Antwerp	Gent	Free	
24 May 2018	Jellert van Landschoot	Club Brugge	OH Leuven	Loan	(Note: Van Landschoot was on loan from Club Brugge to Eindhoven. The loan ended and van Landschoot was now loaned to OH Leuven.)
22 May 2018	Dieter Creemers	Lokeren	Lommel	Undisclosed	
26 May 2018	Jonathan Bolingi	Standard Liège	Antwerp	Undisclosed	(Note: Bolingi was on loan from Standard Liège to Excel Mouscron. The loan ended and Bolingi was now sold to Antwerp.)
27 May 2018	Noël Soumah	Gent	Westerlo	Undisclosed	(Note: Soumah was already on loan from Gent to Westerlo since the summer of 2017. All parties agreed to make the transfer permanent.)
28 May 2018	Jonathan Kindermans	Mechelen	RWDM47	Undisclosed	(Note: Kindermans was on loan from KV Mechelen to Union SG since the 2017–18 winter transfer window. The loan ended and Kindermans was sold to RWDM47.)
28 May 2018	Antoine Lejoly	Standard Liège	Beerschot Wilrijk	Undisclosed	
29 May 2018	Jeroen Goor	Westerlo	Olympia Wijgmaal	Loan	
29 May 2018	Grégory Grisez	Roeselare	Beerschot Wilrijk	Undisclosed	
29 May 2018	Brian Hämäläinen	Zulte Waregem	Dynamo Dresden	Free	
29 May 2018	Mats Rits	Mechelen	Club Brugge	€2 000 000	
30 May 2018	Ali Gholizadeh	Saipa	Charleroi	Undisclosed	
31 May 2018	Lilian Bochet	Roeselare	Olympic Charleroi	Undisclosed	
31 May 2018	Andrei Camargo	Lierse	Roeselare	Free	
31 May 2018	Mehdi Carcela	Granada	Standard Liège	Undisclosed	(Note: Carcela was already on loan from Granada to Standard Liège since the 2017–18 winter transfer window. All parties agreed to make the transfer permanent.)
31 May 2018	Mathieu Dossevi	Standard Liège	Metz	Undisclosed	(Note: Dossevi was already on loan from Standard Liège to Metz during the 2017–18 season. Metz activated the clause to make the move permanent.)
31 May 2018	Olivier Myny	Waasland-Beveren	OH Leuven	Undisclosed	
31 May 2018	Julian Schauerte	Fortuna Düsseldorf	Eupen	Undisclosed	
31 May 2018	Mikael Seoudi	Roeselare	Olympic Charleroi	Undisclosed	

=== End of 2017–18 season ===
After the end of the 2017–18 season, several players will return from loan to another club or will not have their contracts extended. These will be listed here when the date is otherwise not specified.

Date	Name	Moving from	Moving to	Fee	Note
End of 2017–18 season	Karim Achahbar	Tubize	Guingamp	Loan Return	
End of 2017–18 season	Younes Achter	Antwerp	City Pirates	End of contract	
End of 2017–18 season	Rachid Aït-Atmane	Waasland-Beveren	Gijón	Loan Return	
End of 2017–18 season	Chuba Akpom	Sint-Truiden	Arsenal	Loan Return	
End of 2017–18 season	Victorien Angban	Waasland-Beveren	Chelsea	Loan Return	
End of 2017–18 season	Joaquín Ardaiz	Antwerp	El Tanque Sisley	Loan Return	
End of 2017–18 season	Panos Armenakas	Tubize	Udinese	Loan Return	
End of 2017–18 season	Souleymane Aw	Roeselare	Eupen	Loan Return	
End of 2017–18 season	Benjamin Bambi	Heist	OH Leuven	Loan Return	
End of 2017–18 season	Benjamin Boulenger	OH Leuven	Charleroi	Loan Return	
End of 2017–18 season	Fabien Camus	Mechelen	Free Agent	End of contract	
End of 2017–18 season	Maxence Carlier	Tubize	Lens	Loan Return	
End of 2017–18 season	Adriano Cipollina	Union SG	Free Agent	End of contract	
End of 2017–18 season	Jordy Clasie	Club Brugge	Southampton	Loan Return	
End of 2017–18 season	Alexander Corryn	Antwerp	Mechelen	Loan Return	
End of 2017–18 season	Niels Coussement	Cercle Brugge	Zwevezele	Free	(Note: Coussement was on loan from Cercle Brugge to Knokke during the 2017-18 season. After the loan ended, Coussement was released by Cercle Brugge and moved to Zwevezele.)
End of 2017–18 season	Crysan	Cercle Brugge	Atlético Paranaense	Loan Return	
End of 2017–18 season	Anthony D'Alberto	Charleroi	Braga B	Loan Return	
End of 2017–18 season	Ritchie De Laet	Antwerp	Aston Villa	Loan Return	
End of 2017–18 season	Lennert De Smul	Kortrijk	Free Agent	End of contract	(Note: De Smul was on loan from Kortrijk to Deinze during the 2017–18 season. After the loan ended, De Smul was released by Kortrijk.)
End of 2017–18 season	Aaron Dhondt	Waasland-Beveren	Knokke	Undisclosed	(Note: Dhondt was already on loan from Waasland-Beveren to Knokke during the 2017–18 season. After the loan ended, Dhondt moved to Knokke on a permanent basis.)
End of 2017–18 season	Mamadou Diallo	Union SG	Free Agent	End of contract	
End of 2017–18 season	Abdel Diarra	Beerschot Wilrijk	Free Agent	Released	
End of 2017–18 season	Elderson Echiéjilé	Cercle Brugge	Monaco	Loan Return	
End of 2017–18 season	Jordy Gaspar	Cercle Brugge	Monaco	Loan Return	
End of 2017–18 season	Bo Geens	Lokeren	Free Agent	End of contract	
End of 2017–18 season	Merveille Goblet	Waasland-Beveren	Free Agent	End of contract	
End of 2017–18 season	Dimitrios Goutas	Sint-Truiden	Olympiacos	Loan Return	
End of 2017–18 season	Ewout Gouw	Tubize	Free Agent	End of contract	
End of 2017–18 season	Babacar Guèye	Sint-Truiden	Hannover 96	Loan Return	
End of 2017–18 season	Ibou	Tubize	Free Agent	Released	
End of 2017–18 season	Emmanuel Imorou	Cercle Brugge	Caen	Loan Return	
End of 2017–18 season	Wolke Janssens	Lierse	Sint-Truiden	Loan Return	
End of 2017–18 season	Dico Jap Tjong	OH Leuven	Free Agent	End of contract	
End of 2017–18 season	Nathan Kabasele	Union SG	Gazişehir Gaziantep	Loan Return	
End of 2017–18 season	Mohamed Kané	Tubize	Metz	Loan Return	
End of 2017–18 season	Stelios Kitsiou	Sint-Truiden	PAOK	Loan Return	
End of 2017–18 season	Mamadou Koné	Eupen	Leganés	Loan Return	
End of 2017–18 season	Miloš Kosanović	Göztepe	Standard Liège	Loan Return	
End of 2017–18 season	Georgios Koutroumpis	Standard Liège	Free Agent	End of contract	
End of 2017–18 season	Mulopo Kudimbana	Union SG	Free Agent	End of contract	
End of 2017–18 season	Sébastien Locigno	Excel Mouscron	Free Agent	End of contract	
End of 2017–18 season	Lazar Marković	Anderlecht	Liverpool	Loan Return	
End of 2017–18 season	Jordan Massengo	Union SG	Free Agent	End of contract	
End of 2017–18 season	Kule Mbombo	Vita Club	Beerschot Wilrijk	Loan Extended	
End of 2017–18 season	Jean Alassane Mendy	Lokeren	Free Agent	Released	
End of 2017–18 season	Teddy Mézague	Excel Mouscron	Free Agent	End of contract	
End of 2017–18 season	Tristan Muyumba	Cercle Brugge	Monaco	Loan Return	
End of 2017–18 season	Grégoire Neels	Union SG	Free Agent	End of contract	
End of 2017–18 season	Leo Njengo	Dessel Sport	OH Leuven	Loan Return	
End of 2017–18 season	Godwin Odibo	OH Leuven	Free Agent	End of contract	
End of 2017–18 season	Henry Onyekuru	Anderlecht	Everton	Loan Return	
End of 2017–18 season	Nicolas Orye	Heist	Waasland-Beveren	Loan Return	
End of 2017–18 season	Randal Oto'o	Braga	Westerlo	Undisclosed	(Note: Oto'o was on loan from Braga to Westerlo since the summer 2016 transfer window. All parties agreed to make the transfer permanent.)
End of 2017–18 season	Erik Palmer-Brown	Kortrijk	Manchester City	Loan Return	
End of 2017–18 season	Laurens Paulussen	Mechelen	Free Agent	End of contract	
End of 2017–18 season	Mathieu Peybernes	Eupen	Lorient	Loan Return	
End of 2017–18 season	Ethan Poulain	La Louvière Centre	Charleroi	Loan Return	
End of 2017–18 season	Zotsara Randriambololona	Roeselare	Antwerp	Loan Return	
End of 2017–18 season	Roberto	Antwerp	Free Agent	End of contract	
End of 2017–18 season	Rafael Romo	Beerschot Wilrijk	APOEL	Loan Return	
End of 2017–18 season	Steve Ryckaert	Tubize	Sint-Truiden	Loan Return	
End of 2017–18 season	Ivan Šaponjić	Zulte Waregem	Benfica	Loan Return	
End of 2017–18 season	Rauno Sappinen	Beerschot Wilrijk	Flora	Loan Return	
End of 2017–18 season	Sidy Sarr	Kortrijk	Free Agent	End of contract	(Note: Sarr was on loan from Kortrijk to Châteauroux during the 2017-18 season. After the loan ended, Sarr was released by Kortrijk.)
End of 2017–18 season	Matz Sels	Anderlecht	Newcastle United	Loan Return	
End of 2017–18 season	Timmy Simons	Club Brugge	Free Agent	Retired	
End of 2017–18 season	Iebe Swers	Lommel	Sint-Truiden	Loan Return	
End of 2017–18 season	Collins Tanor	Beerschot Wilrijk	Manchester City	Loan Return	
End of 2017–18 season	Tesfaldet Tekie	Östersund	Gent	Loan Return	
End of 2017–18 season	Mario Tičinović	Hajduk Split	Lokeren	Loan Return	
End of 2017–18 season	Holly Tshimanga	Genk	Free Agent	End of contract	
End of 2017–18 season	Victor Vandewiele	Oostende	Free Agent	End of contract	
End of 2017–18 season	Senne Van Dooren	Berchem Sport	Waasland-Beveren	Loan Return	
End of 2017–18 season	Bryan Verboom	Kortrijk	Zulte Waregem	Loan Return	
End of 2017–18 season	Kenneth Vermeer	Club Brugge	Feyenoord	Loan Return	
End of 2017–18 season	Igor Vetokele	Sint-Truiden	Charlton Athletic	Loan Return	
End of 2017–18 season	Sandro Wieser	Roeselare	Reading	Loan Return	
End of 2017–18 season	Simon Zenke	Tubize	Free Agent	End of contract	

=== June 2018 ===
Date	Name	Moving from	Moving to	Fee	Note
1 June 2018	Michaël Clepkens	Beerschot Wilrijk	Knokke	Free	(Note: Clepkens was on loan from Beerschot Wilrijk to Lommel during the 2017–18 season. The loan ended and Clepkens was released to Knokke.)
2 June 2018	Karlo Lulić	Rudeš	Waasland-Beveren	Undisclosed	
4 June 2018	Samuel Gigot	Gent	Spartak Moscow	Undisclosed	
4 June 2018	Tibo Persyn	Club Brugge	Inter Milan	Undisclosed	
5 June 2018	Héritier Luvumbu	Union SG	FAR Rabat	Free	
5 June 2018	Stefan Mitrović	Gent	Strasbourg	Undisclosed	
6 June 2018	Omid Noorafkan	Esteghlal	Charleroi	Undisclosed	
6 June 2018	Christian Osaguona	Westerlo	Umm Salal	Undisclosed	
7 June 2018	Frédéric Duplus	Lens	OH Leuven	Undisclosed	
7 June 2018	Arnaut Danjuma	NEC	Club Brugge	Undisclosed	
7 June 2018	Xavi Molina	Gimnàstic	Eupen	Undisclosed	
7 June 2018	Ben Yagan	Dessel Sport	Roeselare	Undisclosed	
8 June 2018	Franck Berrier	Oostende	Mechelen	Undisclosed	
8 June 2018	Siebe Schrijvers	Genk	Club Brugge	Undisclosed	
9 June 2018	Anders Christiansen	Gent	Malmö	Undisclosed	
9 June 2018	Axel Leers	Union SG	Virton	Undisclosed	
11 June 2018	Eliot Matazo	Anderlecht	Monaco	Undisclosed	
11 June 2018	Joseph Paintsil	Ferencváros	Genk	Undisclosed	
11 June 2018	Tobias Salquist	Silkeborg	Waasland-Beveren	Undisclosed	
12 June 2018	Daniel Christensen	Westerlo	Vendsyssel	Free	
12 June 2018	Thomas Didillon	Metz	Anderlecht	Undisclosed	
12 June 2018	Fazlı Kocabaş	Wallonia Walhain	Roeselare	Undisclosed	
12 June 2018	Ihor Plastun	Ludogorets Razgrad	Gent	Undisclosed	
13 June 2018	Faysel Kasmi	Waterford	Beerschot Wilrijk	Undisclosed	
13 June 2018	Andy Kawaya	Mechelen	Avellino	Free	
13 June 2018	Goran Milović	Chongqing Dangdai Lifan	Oostende	Undisclosed	
13 June 2018	Paul Nardi	Monaco	Cercle Brugge	Loan Extended	
14 June 2018	Samuel Bastien	Chievo Verona	Standard Liège	Undisclosed	
14 June 2018	Alessandro Cerigioni	Waasland-Beveren	Lommel	Undisclosed	(Note: Cerigioni was on loan from Waasland-Beveren to Roeselare during the 2017–18 season. The loan ended and Cerigioni was sold to Lommel.)
14 June 2018	Samy Kehli	Lokeren	OH Leuven	Undisclosed	(Note: Kehli was already on loan from Lokeren to OH Leuven during the second half of the 2017–18 season. The loan ended and Kehli was transferred to OH Leuven on a permanent basis.)
14 June 2018	Mićo Kuzmanović	Sarajevo	Excel Mouscron	Undisclosed	
14 June 2018	Luka Luković	Bačka	Excel Mouscron	Undisclosed	
14 June 2018	Robin Mantel	ASV Geel	Lokeren	Undisclosed	
14 June 2018	François Marquet	Waasland-Beveren	Oostende	Free	
14 June 2018	Duckens Nazon	Wolverhampton Wanderers	Sint-Truiden	Undisclosed	
14 June 2018	Jonas Vinck	Lierse	Lommel	Free	
15 June 2018	Yady Bangoura	Union SG	RFC Liège	Undisclosed	(Note: Bangoura was on loan from Union SG to Eendracht Aalst during the 2017–18 season. The loan ended and Bangoura was now sold to RFC Liège.)
15 June 2018	Lucas Bijker	Cádiz	Mechelen	Undisclosed	
15 June 2018	Indy Boonen	Manchester United	Oostende	Undisclosed	
15 June 2018	Stijn De Smet	Kortrijk	Roeselare	Free	
15 June 2018	Karlo Letica	Hajduk Split	Club Brugge	Undisclosed	
15 June 2018	Damien Mouchamps	Eupen	RFC Liège	Free	
15 June 2018	Aboud Omar	Slavia Sofia	Cercle Brugge	Undisclosed	
15 June 2018	Mikael Soisalo	Middlesbrough	Zulte Waregem	Undisclosed	
16 June 2018	Kévin Appin	Monaco	Cercle Brugge	Loan	
16 June 2018	Nils Bouekou	Créteil	Union SG	Undisclosed	
16 June 2018	Yoann Etienne	Monaco	Cercle Brugge	Loan	
16 June 2018	Jeffrey Ket	Lommel	Quick Boys	Loan	(Note: The deal involves the agreement that Ket will be on loan from Lommel to Quick Boys until the winter 2018-19 transfer window, after which Ket will make a permanent transfer.)
16 June 2018	Pierre-Daniel N'Guinda	Monaco	Cercle Brugge	Loan	
16 June 2018	Luciano Slagveer	Lokeren	Emmen	Loan	(Note: Slagveer was on loan from Lokeren to Twente during the 2017–18 season. The loan ended and Slagveer was now loaned to Emmen.)
17 June 2018	Anders Kristiansen	Sarpsborg 08	Union SG	Undisclosed	
17 June 2018	Danijel Milićević	Gent	Eupen	Undisclosed	(Note: Milićević was on loan from Gent to Metz during the 2017–18 season. The loan ended and Milićević was now sold to Eupen.)
17 June 2018	Urho Nissilä	KuPS	Zulte Waregem	Undisclosed	
18 June 2018	Aurélio Buta	Benfica	Antwerp	Undisclosed	(Note: Buta was already on loan from Benfica to Antwerp during the 2017–18 season. The loan ended but all parties came to an agreement to make the transfer permanent.)
18 June 2018	Odeni George	Eupen	Free Agent	End of contract	
18 June 2018	Denzel Jubitana	Mechelen	Waasland-Beveren	Undisclosed	
18 June 2018	Sava Petrov	Spartak Subotica	Westerlo	Undisclosed	
19 June 2018	Jonathan Buatu Mananga	Waasland-Beveren	Rio Ave	Undisclosed	
19 June 2018	Omar Colley	Genk	Sampdoria	Undisclosed	
19 June 2018	Augusto Da Silva	Union SG	Lierse Kempenzonen	Undisclosed	
19 June 2018	Laurent Jans	Waasland-Beveren	Metz	Undisclosed	
19 June 2018	Clinton Mata	Charleroi	Club Brugge	Undisclosed	(Note: Mata was on loan from Charleroi to Genk during the 2017–18 season. The loan ended and Mata was sold to Club Brugge.)
19 June 2018	Riley McGree	Club Brugge	Melbourne City	Loan	(Note: McGree was on loan from Club Brugge to Newcastle Jets during the second half of the 2017–18 season. The loan ended and McGree was now loaned to Melbourne City.)
19 June 2018	Vladimir Screciu	Universitatea Craiova	Genk	Undisclosed	
19 June 2018	Tarik Tissoudali	Le Havre	Beerschot Wilrijk	Undisclosed	
19 June 2018	Michael Verrips	Sparta Rotterdam	Mechelen	Undisclosed	
20 June 2018	Carlens Arcus	Cercle Brugge	Auxerre	Undisclosed	(Note: Arcus was already on loan from Cercle Brugge to Auxerre during the 2017–18 season. All parties agreed to make the transfer permanent.)
20 June 2018	Alexandre De Bruyn	Lommel	Sint-Truiden	Undisclosed	
20 June 2018	Kenneth Houdret	Union SG	Avellino	Free	
20 June 2018	Elliott Moore	Leicester City	OH Leuven	Loan Extended	(Note: Moore was already on loan from Leicester City to OH Leuven during the 2017–18 season. The loan was extended for another season.)
20 June 2018	Steven Pinto-Borges	Grenoble	Union SG	Undisclosed	
20 June 2018	Eric Smith	Norrköping	Gent	Undisclosed	
20 June 2018	Guévin Tormin	Monaco	Cercle Brugge	Loan Extended	
20 June 2018	Hadamou Traoré	Drancy	Union SG	Undisclosed	
20 June 2018	Jonas Vinck	Lommel	Free Agent	Contract Terminated	
20 June 2018	Ognjen Vranješ	AEK Athens	Anderlecht	Undisclosed	
21 June 2018	Henrik Bjørdal	Brighton & Hove Albion	Zulte Waregem	Undisclosed	
21 June 2018	Youssef Boulaouali	Beerschot Wilrijk	Lierse Kempenzonen	Undisclosed	
21 June 2018	Enzo D'Alberto	Anderlecht	Union SG	Undisclosed	
21 June 2018	Bambo Diaby	Sampdoria	Lokeren	Undisclosed	
21 June 2018	Jean-Luc Dompé	Standard Liège	Gent	Undisclosed	(Note: Dompé was on loan from Standard Liège to Amiens during the 2017–18 season. The loan ended and Dompé was sold to Gent.)
21 June 2018	Idrissa Doumbia	Anderlecht	Akhmat Grozny	Undisclosed	(Note: Doumbia was on loan from Anderlecht to Zulte Waregem during the 2017-18 season. The loan ended and Doumbia was sold to Akhmat Grozny.)
21 June 2018	Wout Faes	Anderlecht	Oostende	Undisclosed	(Note: Faes was on loan from Anderlecht to Excelsior during the 2017–18 season. The loan ended and Faes was sold to Oostende.)
21 June 2018	Lior Inbrum	Gent	Beitar Jerusalem	Loan	(Note: Inbrum was on loan from Gent to Ashdod during the second half of the 2017–18 season. The loan ended and Inbrum was now loaned to Beitar Jerusalem.)
21 June 2018	Gökhan Kardeş	PSV	Beerschot Wilrijk	Undisclosed	
21 June 2018	Alexandros Katranis	Saint-Étienne	Excel Mouscron	Loan	
21 June 2018	Ilias Moutha-Sebtaoui	Manchester United	Anderlecht	Undisclosed	
21 June 2018	Jorn Vancamp	Anderlecht	Beerschot Wilrijk	Undisclosed	(Note: Vancamp was on loan from Anderlecht to Roda JC during the 2017–18 season. The loan ended and Vancamp was sold to Beerschot Wilrijk.)
22 June 2018	Ahmed El Messaoudi	Mechelen	Fortuna Sittard	Loan	
22 June 2018	George Hirst	Sheffield Wednesday	OH Leuven	Free	
22 June 2018	Ahmed Mostafa	Petrojet	Gent	Undisclosed	
22 June 2018	Gilles Ruyssen	Lommel	RWDM47	Undisclosed	
22 June 2018	Dante Vanzeir	Genk	Beerschot Wilrijk	Loan	
22 June 2018	Ivan Yagan	Lierse	Eupen	Free	
23 June 2018	Elton Acolatse	Club Brugge	Sint-Truiden	Undisclosed	(Note: Acolatse was already on loan from Club Brugge to Sint-Truiden during the 2017–18 season. All parties agreed to make the transfer permanent.)
24 June 2018	Antoine Bernier	Anderlecht	Antwerp	Undisclosed	
24 June 2018	Thomas Buffel	Genk	Zulte Waregem	Free	
25 June 2018	Kevin Debaty	Antwerp	Waasland-Beveren	Free	
25 June 2018	Ambroise Gboho	Les Herbiers	Westerlo	Undisclosed	
25 June 2018	Tom Rosenthal	Dordrecht	Tubize	Undisclosed	
25 June 2018	Kenny van der Weg	Hamilton Academical	Roeselare	Undisclosed	
25 June 2018	Zinho Vanheusden	Internazionale	Standard Liège	Loan Extended	(Note: Vanheusden was already on loan from Internazionale to Standard Liège during the second half of the 2017-18 season. The loan was extended for another season.)
26 June 2018	Georgi Chelidze	Dynamo Moscow	Tubize	Undisclosed	
26 June 2018	David Pollet	Charleroi	Eupen	Loan	
26 June 2018	Marc Valiente	Eupen	Partizan	Undisclosed	
27 June 2018	Michaël Lallemand	Kortrijk	Deinze	Free	(Note: Lallemand was on loan from Kortrijk to Deinze during the 2017–18 season. After the loan ended, the contract of Lallemand with Kortrijk had expired, allowing him to move as a free agent to Deinze.)
27 June 2018	Divine Naah	Manchester City	Tubize	Free	(Note: Naah was already on loan from Manchester City to Tubize during the 2017–18 season. Naah's contract at Manchester City ended and Tubize signed him permanently.)
27 June 2018	Fabrice Ondoa	Sevilla Atlético	Oostende	Undisclosed	
27 June 2018	Jérémy Perbet	Club Brugge	Charleroi	Undisclosed	(Note: Perbet was on loan from Club Brugge to Kortrijk during the 2017–18 season. The loan ended and Perbet was now sold to Charleroi.)
28 June 2018	Franck Irie	Monaco	Cercle Brugge	Undisclosed	
28 June 2018	Cheick Keita	Birmingham City	Eupen	Loan	
28 June 2018	Senna Miangue	Cagliari	Standard Liège	Loan	
28 June 2018	Idrisa Sambú	Spartak Moscow	Excel Mouscron	Loan	
28 June 2018	Thallyson	Novorizontino	Sint-Truiden	Undisclosed	
28 June 2018	Simon Vermeiren	Lommel	Lierse Kempenzonen	Undisclosed	
29 June 2018	Colin Coosemans	Mechelen	Gent	Undisclosed	
29 June 2018	Aleksa Damjanac	Mallorca B	Excel Mouscron	Undisclosed	
29 June 2018	Gustav Engvall	Bristol City	Mechelen	Undisclosed	
29 June 2018	Murad Han Gönen	Club Brugge	Tubize	Undisclosed	
29 June 2018	Thomas Henry	Chambly	Tubize	Undisclosed	
29 June 2018	Aaron Leya Iseka	Anderlecht	Toulouse	Undisclosed	(Note: Leya Iseka was on loan from Anderlecht to Zulte Waregem during the 2017–18 season. The loan ended and Leya Iseka was sold to Toulouse.)
29 June 2018	Mario Ortiz Ruiz	Cultural Leonesa	Eupen	Undisclosed	
29 June 2018	Quintijn Steelant	Beerschot Wilrijk	Dikkelvenne	Free	
29 June 2018	Florian Tardieu	Sochaux-Montbéliard	Zulte Waregem	Undisclosed	
29 June 2018	Jens Teunckens	Club Brugge	Antwerp	Undisclosed	(Note: Teunckens was already on loan from Club Brugge to Antwerp during the 2017–18 season. All parties agreed to make the transfer permanent.)
29 June 2018	William Togui	Gagnoa	Mechelen	Undisclosed	
30 June 2018	Senne Lynen	Club Brugge	Telstar	Undisclosed	(Note: Lynen was already on loan from Club Brugge to Telstar during the second half of the 2017–18 season. All parties agreed to make the transfer permanent.)

=== July 2018 ===
Date	Name	Moving from	Moving to	Fee	Note
1 July 2018	Samy Mmaee	Standard Liège	Sint-Truiden	Undisclosed	(Note: Mmaee was on loan from Standard Liège to MVV during the 2017–18 season. The loan ended and Mmaee was sold to Sint-Truiden.)
1 July 2018	Luan Peres Petroni	Ituano	Club Brugge	Undisclosed	
1 July 2018	Federico Vega	Lorca	Union SG	Undisclosed	
2 July 2018	Beni Badibanga	Standard Liège	Waasland-Beveren	Free	(Note: Badibanga was on loan from Standard Liège to Lierse during the second half of the 2017–18 season. The loan ended and Badibanga was sold to Waasland-Beveren.)
2 July 2018	Geert Berben	OH Leuven	Lommel	Undisclosed	(Note: Berben was on loan from OH Leuven to Oosterzonen during the second half of the 2017–18 season. The loan ended and Berben was sold to Lommel.)
2 July 2018	Landry Dimata	VfL Wolfsburg	Anderlecht	Loan	
2 July 2018	Zinho Gano	Oostende	Genk	Undisclosed	
3 July 2018	Zakaria Bakkali	Valencia	Anderlecht	Undisclosed	
3 July 2018	Alexandru Chipciu	Anderlecht	Sparta Prague	Loan	
3 July 2018	Gaëtan Coucke	Genk	Lommel	Loan	
3 July 2018	Anthony Lippini	Tours	Tubize	Undisclosed	
3 July 2018	Ivan Santini	Caen	Anderlecht	Undisclosed	
3 July 2018	Niels Verburgh	Club Brugge	Roda JC	Undisclosed	(Note: Verburgh was on loan from Club Brugge to Waasland-Beveren during the second half of the 2017–18 season. The loan ended and Verburgh was now sold to Roda JC.)
3 July 2018	Marten Wilmots	Standard Liège	Avellino	Undisclosed	
4 July 2018	Thomas Azevedo	OH Leuven	Lommel	Free	(Note: Azevedo was on loan from OH Leuven to Lommel during the second half of the 2017–18 season. The loan ended and Azevedo signed as a free agent player for Lommel.)
4 July 2018	Théo Bongonda	Celta de Vigo	Zulte Waregem	Undisclosed	(Note: Bongonda was already on loan from Celta de Vigo to Zulte Waregem during the 2017–18 season. All parties agreed to make the transfer permanent.)
4 July 2018	Irvin Cardona	Monaco	Cercle Brugge	Loan Extended	
4 July 2018	Luis Pedro Cavanda	Galatasaray	Standard Liège	Undisclosed	(Note: Cavanda was already on loan from Galatasaray to Standard Liège during the 2017–18 season. All parties agreed to make the transfer permanent.)
4 July 2018	Dimitris Kolovos	Mechelen	Willem II	Loan	
4 July 2018	Marcel Mehlem	Karlsruher SC	Union SG	Undisclosed	
5 July 2018	Lucas Alfieri	Club Brugge	Tubize	Undisclosed	
5 July 2018	Carlos David Moreno	Huesca	Union SG	Undisclosed	
5 July 2018	Christophe Janssens	Genk	Westerlo	Undisclosed	(Note: Janssens was on loan from Genk to MVV during the 2017-18 season. The loan ended and Janssens was now sold to Westerlo.)
5 July 2018	Elton Kabangu	Gent	Eindhoven	Loan Extended	
5 July 2018	Arnaud Lusamba	Nice	Cercle Brugge	Loan	
5 July 2018	Pieter-Jan Monteyne	Roeselare	Hamme	Free	
5 July 2018	Tino-Sven Sušić	Antwerp	VVV	Free	
6 July 2018	Sam Hendriks	Go Ahead Eagles	OH Leuven	Undisclosed	
6 July 2018	Vagner	Excel Mouscron	Qarabağ	Undisclosed	(Note: Vagner was on loan from Excel Mouscron to Boavista during the 2017–18 season. The loan ended and Vagner was now sold to Qarabağ.)
7 July 2018	Stéphane Badji	Anderlecht	Bursaspor	Undisclosed	(Note: Badji was on loan from Anderlecht to Kayserispor during the 2017–18 season. The loan ended and Badji was now sold to Bursaspor.)
8 July 2018	Mario Babić	Tubize	Široki Brijeg	Undisclosed	
8 July 2018	Nikola Jambor	Lokeren	Rio Ave	Undisclosed	(Note: Jambor was on loan from Lokeren to Osijek during the 2017–18 season. The loan ended and Jambor was now sold to Široki Brijeg.)
8 July 2018	Deiver Machado	Gent	Atlético Nacional	Loan	
8 July 2018	Milan Savić	Red Star Belgrade	Mechelen	Undisclosed	
9 July 2018	Danzell Gravenberch	Reading	Roeselare	Loan Extended	
9 July 2018	Dylan Lambrecth	Anderlecht	Free Agent	Released	(Note: Lambrecth was on loan from Anderlecht to Waremme during the 2017–18 season. The loan ended and Lambrecth was released.)
9 July 2018	Fashion Sakala	Spartak Moscow	Oostende	Undisclosed	
10 July 2018	Abdelrafik Gérard	Lens	Union SG	Undisclosed	
10 July 2018	Takahiro Sekine	Ingolstadt 04	Sint-Truiden	Loan	
10 July 2018	Din Sula	OH Leuven	Waasland-Beveren	Undisclosed	(Note: Sula was on loan from OH Leuven to Lommel during the 2017-18 season. The loan ended and Sula was sold to Waasland-Beveren.)
11 July 2018	Pol García	Juventus	Sint-Truiden	Undisclosed	
11 July 2018	Ilombe Mboyo	Sion	Kortrijk	Undisclosed	
11 July 2018	Daniel Opare	FC Augsburg	Antwerp	Free	
12 July 2018	Daniel Graovac	Excel Mouscron	Vojvodina	Free	(Note: Graovac was on loan from Excel Mouscron to Željezničar during the 2017-18 season. The loan ended and Graovac was sold to Waasland-Beveren.)
12 July 2018	Matheus	Londrina	Antwerp	Undisclosed	(Note: Matheus was already on loan from Londrina to Antwerp during the 2017-18 season. The loan ended but all parties came to an agreement to make the transfer permanent.)
12 July 2018	Sébastien Siani	Antwerp	Al Jazira	Undisclosed	
13 July 2018	Kanu	Omonia	Kortrijk	Undisclosed	
13 July 2018	Dimitri Lavalée	Standard Liège	MVV	Loan	
13 July 2018	Farouk Miya	Standard Liège	Gorica	Undisclosed	(Note: Miya was on loan from Standard Liège to Sabail since the 2017-18 winter transfer window. The loan ended and Miya was sold to Gorica.)
13 July 2018	Mohammad Naderi	Tractor Sazi	Kortrijk	Undisclosed	
13 July 2018	Jean Marco Toualy	Salitas	Kortrijk	Undisclosed	
13 July 2018	Vitinho	Cruzeiro	Cercle Brugge	Undisclosed	
16 July 2018	Romeni Scott Bitsindou	Javor Matis	Lommel	Free	
17 July 2018	Rafidine Abdullah	Cádiz	Waasland-Beveren	Free	
17 July 2018	Youcef Attal	Kortrijk	Nice	Undisclosed	
17 July 2018	Guillaume François	Beerschot Wilrijk	Virton	Free	
17 July 2018	Lemouya Goudiaby	Metz	Tubize	Undisclosed	
17 July 2018	Simen Juklerød	Vålerenga	Antwerp	Undisclosed	
17 July 2018	Yassine Salah	Union SG	Olympic Charleroi	Undisclosed	(Note: Salah was on loan from Union SG to Sint-Truiden during the 2017-18 season. The loan ended and Salah was sold to Olympic Charleroi.)
17 July 2018	Florent Stevance	Charleroi	Tours	Undisclosed	(Note: Stevance was on loan from Charleroi to Tubize during the 2017-18 season. The loan ended and Stevance was sold to Tours.)
17 July 2018	Naomichi Ueda	Kashima Antlers	Cercle Brugge	Undisclosed	
18 July 2018	Giorgi Kvilitaia	Rapid Wien	Gent	Undisclosed	
18 July 2018	Jhon Lucumí	Deportivo Cali	Genk	Undisclosed	
19 July 2018	Gertjan Martens	Union SG	Tubize	Undisclosed	
19 July 2018	Anthony Moris	Mechelen	Virton	Free	
19 July 2018	Leonardo Rocha	Ontinyent	Lommel	Undisclosed	
19 July 2018	Orlando Sá	Henan Jianye	Standard Liège	Undisclosed	
20 July 2018	Glenn Claes	Mechelen	Lommel	Undisclosed	
20 July 2018	Soufiane El Banouhi	Union SG	Lommel	Loan	
20 July 2018	Silvère Ganvoula	Anderlecht	VfL Bochum	Loan	
20 July 2018	Hervé Kage	Kortrijk	Adana Demirspor	Loan	(Note: Kage was on loan from Kortrijk to Kardemir Karabükspor during the second half of the 2017–18 season. The loan ended and Kage was now loaned to Adana Demirspor.)
20 July 2018	Matej Mitrović	Beşiktaş	Club Brugge	Undisclosed	(Note: Mitrović was on already loan from Besiktas to Club Brugge during the second half of the 2017–18 season. All parties agreed to make the transfer permanent.)
20 July 2018	Maxim Nys	Waasland-Beveren	Dender EH	Undisclosed	
21 July 2018	Wataru Endo	Urawa Red Diamonds	Sint-Truiden	Undisclosed	
21 July 2018	Rangelo Janga	Gent	Astana	Undisclosed	
21 July 2018	Vadis Odjidja-Ofoe	Olympiacos	Gent	Undisclosed	
21 July 2018	Peter Olayinka	Gent	Slavia Prague	Undisclosed	(Note: Olayinka was on loan from Gent to Zulte Waregem during the 2017–18 season. The loan ended and Olayinka was now sold to Slavia Pragua.)
21 July 2018	Dorin Rotariu	Club Brugge	AZ	Loan	(Note: Rotariu was on loan from Club Brugge to Excel Mouscron during the 2017–18 season. The loan ended and Rotariu was now loaned to AZ.)
21 July 2018	Anton Saroka	Dinamo Minsk	Lokeren	Undisclosed	
22 July 2018	Jens Cools	Waasland-Beveren	Pafos	Free	
23 July 2018	Taiwo Awoniyi	Liverpool	Gent	Loan	(Note: Awoniyi was on loan from Liverpool to Excel Mouscron during the 2017–18 season. The loan ended and Awoniyi was now loaned to Gent.)
23 July 2018	Max Besuschkow	Eintracht Frankfurt	Union SG	Loan	
23 July 2018	Fran Brodić	Club Brugge	Catania	Undisclosed	(Note: Brodić was already on loan from Club Brugge to Catania since the 2017–18 winter transfer window. All parties agreed to make the transfer permanent.)
23 July 2018	Dorian Dervite	Bolton Wanderers	Charleroi	Undisclosed	
23 July 2018	Edmilson Junior	Standard Liège	Al-Duhail	Undisclosed	
23 July 2018	Marko Maletić	Roeselare	Dordrecht	Loan	
23 July 2018	Jordi Vanlerberghe	Club Brugge	Oostende	Loan	
24 July 2018	Adrien Bongiovanni	Monaco	Cercle Brugge	Loan	
24 July 2018	Mathieu Cornet	Roeselare	Mechelen	Undisclosed	
24 July 2018	Koni De Winter	Zulte Waregem	Juventus	Undisclosed	
24 July 2018	Jordy Gillekens	OH Leuven	Fiorentina	Loan	
24 July 2018	Didier Lamkel Zé	Chamois Niortais	Antwerp	Undisclosed	
24 July 2018	Jesús Marimón	Once Caldas	Excel Mouscron	Undisclosed	
24 July 2018	Thanasis Papazoglou	Kortrijk	Hapoel Haifa	Free	
24 July 2018	Paolo Sabak	Genk	NEC	Undisclosed	
25 July 2018	Maxime Lestienne	Rubin Kazan	Standard Liège	Undisclosed	
26 July 2018	Francesco Forte	Inter Milan	Waasland-Beveren	Undisclosed	
26 July 2018	Petar Golubović	Novara	Kortrijk	Undisclosed	
26 July 2018	Brendan Hines-Ike	Örebro	Kortrijk	Undisclosed	
26 July 2018	Andi Koshi	PSV	Cercle Brugge	Undisclosed	
26 July 2018	Dennis Van Vaerenbergh	Club Brugge	Dender EH	Undisclosed	(Note: Van Vaerenbergh was on loan from Club Brugge to Eindhoven. The loan ended and Van Vaerenbergh was now sold to Dender EH.)
26 July 2018	Nicolas Verdier	Eupen	Laval	Free	(Note: Verdier was on loan from Eupen to Mechelen during the second half of the 2017-18 season. After the loan ended, Verdiers contract was terminated, allowing him to move to Stade Lavallois.)
27 July 2018	Kino Delorge	Genk	Dinamo București	Undisclosed	(Note: Delorge was on loan from Genk to Dordrecht during the 2017-18 season. After the loan ended, Delorge was sold to Dinamo București.)
27 July 2018	Karim Essikal	Beerschot Wilrijk	Eindhoven	Free	
27 July 2018	Frantzdy Pierrot	Colorado Rapids	Excel Mouscron	Undisclosed	
28 July 2018	Banou Diawara	FAR	Tubize	Undisclosed	
28 July 2018	José Manuel García Naranjo	Genk	Tenerife	Undisclosed	(Note: Naranjo was on loan from Genk to Leganés during the 2017-18 season. After the loan ended, Naranjo was sold to Tenerife.)
28 July 2018	Ibrahima Sory Sankhon	Horoya	Sint-Truiden	Undisclosed	
30 July 2018	Urtzi Iriondo	Athletic Bilbao B	Union SG	Undisclosed	
30 July 2018	Ben Lederman	Barcelona Juvenil A	Gent	Free	
30 July 2018	Erhan Mašović	Club Brugge	Trenčín	Loan	
30 July 2018	Youssouf Niakaté	Boulogne	Union SG	Undisclosed	
30 July 2018	Branislav Niňaj	Lokeren	Fortuna Sittard	Undisclosed	(Note: Niňaj was on loan from Lokeren to Žilina during the second half of the 2017-18 season. After the loan ended, Niňaj was sold to Fortuna Sittard.)
30 July 2018	Levan Shengelia	Tubize	Free Agent	Released	
31 July 2018	Pedro Henrique Bueno	Chamois Niortais	Tubize	Loan	
31 July 2018	Jordan Renson	Lommel	Patro Eisden Maasmechelen	Undisclosed	
31 July 2018	Faycal Rherras	Mechelen	Béziers	Free	(Note: Rherras was on loan from Mechelen to Hibernian during the second half of the 2017-18 season. After the loan ended, Rherras' contract was terminated allowing him to move as a free player to Béziers.)

=== August 2018 ===
Date	Name	Moving from	Moving to	Fee	Note
1 August 2018	Yassin Gueroui	Lommel	Mouloudia Oujda	Free	
1 August 2018	Onur Kaya	Zulte Waregem	Mechelen	Undisclosed	(Note: Although the news was announced on 24 July, the transfer only occurred on 1 August, to allow Kaya to take part in the opening match of Zulte Waregem.)
1 August 2018	Flavien Le Postollec	OH Leuven	Deinze	Free	
2 August 2018	Andriy Batsula	Oleksandriya	Kortrijk	Undisclosed	
3 August 2018	Jakub Brabec	Genk	Çaykur Rizespor	Loan	
3 August 2018	Moussa Wagué	Eupen	Barcelona B	Undisclosed	
4 August 2018	Aliko Bala	Zulte Waregem	Hapoel Marmorek	Loan	(Note: Bala was on loan from Zulte Waregem to Hapoel Acre during the 2017-18 season. The loan ended and Bala was now loaned to Hapoel Marmorek.)
5 August 2018	Samuel Kalu	Gent	Bordeaux	Undisclosed	
5 August 2018	Ben Reichert	Zulte Waregem	Ashdod	Loan	(Note: Reichert was on loan from Zulte Waregem to Hapoel Acre during the first half og 2018. The loan ended and Reichert was now loaned to Ashdod.)
6 August 2018	Nabil Alioui	Monaco	Cercle Brugge	Loan	
6 August 2018	Omri Ben Harush	Maccabi Haifa	Lokeren	Undisclosed	
6 August 2018	Alioune Camara	Iyane Matam	Kortrijk	Undisclosed	
6 August 2018	Romain Habran	Antwerp	Free Agent	Released	
6 August 2018	Đorđe Jovanović	Partizan	Lokeren	Undisclosed	
6 August 2018	Jonathan Pitroipa	Antwerp	Paris	Free	
6 August 2018	Moses Simon	Gent	Levante	Undisclosed	
6 August 2018	Wesley Vanbelle	Cercle Brugge	Lommel	Loan	
7 August 2018	Isaac Kiese Thelin	Anderlecht	Bayer Leverkusen	Loan	(Note: Kiese Thelin was on loan from Anderlecht to Waasland-Beveren during the 2017-18 season. Kiese Thelin was now loaned to Leverkusen.)
7 August 2018	Miguel Mees	Mechelen	Duffel	Loan	(Note: Mees was on loan from Mechelen to Rupel Boom since the 2016 summer transfer window. The loan ended and Mees was now loaned to Duffel.)
7 August 2018	Pierre Zebli	Genk	Ascoli	Loan	
8 August 2018	Bernardinho	Westerlo	ASV Geel	Loan	
8 August 2018	Mohamed Buya Turay	Dalkurd	Sint-Truiden	Undisclosed	
9 August 2018	Giorgi Beridze	Gent	Újpest	Loan	(Note: Beridze was on loan from Gent to Trenčín during the 2017-18 season. The loan ended and Beridze was now loaned to Újpest.)
9 August 2018	Leander Dendoncker	Anderlecht	Wolverhampton Wanderers	Loan	
9 August 2018	Nicklas Pedersen	Mechelen	Emmen	Undisclosed	
9 August 2018	Gino van Kessel	Slavia Prague	Roeselare	Undisclosed	
10 August 2018	Christophe Bertjens	Union SG	Bocholt	Free	
10 August 2018	Fredrik Oldrup Jensen	Zulte Waregem	Göteborg	Loan	
10 August 2018	Alexander Scholz	Club Brugge	Midtjylland	Undisclosed	
10 August 2018	Robin Söder	Lokeren	Göteborg	Undisclosed	
11 August 2018	Imoh Ezekiel	Las Palmas	Kortrijk	Undisclosed	
12 August 2018	Tomás Pina Isla	Club Brugge	Alavés	Undisclosed	(Note: Pina Isla was already on loan from Club Brugge to Alavés during the 2017-18 season. The loan ended but all parties agreed to make the move permanent.)
13 August 2018	Chris Bedia	Charleroi	Zulte Waregem	Loan	
13 August 2018	Siebe Horemans	Gent	Excelsior	Loan	
13 August 2018	Randall Leal	Mechelen	Deportivo Saprissa	Undisclosed	
13 August 2018	Rémy Riou	Alanyaspor	Charleroi	Undisclosed	
13 August 2018	Mamadou Sylla Diallo	Gent	Zulte Waregem	Loan	
15 August 2018	Gertjan De Mets	Zulte Waregem	Beerschot Wilrijk	Loan	
15 August 2018	Percy Tau	Brighton & Hove Albion	Union SG	Loan	
16 August 2018	Charni Ekangamene	Beerschot Wilrijk	Eindhoven	Free	
16 August 2018	Omar Govea	Porto	Antwerp	Loan	(Note: Govea was on loan from Porto to Excel Mouscron during the 2017-18 season. The loan ended and Govea was now loaned to Antwerp.)
16 August 2018	Morteza Pouraliganji	Al Sadd	Eupen	Undisclosed	
17 August 2018	Noë Dussenne	Crotone	Excel Mouscron	Undisclosed	(Note: Dussenne was on loan from Crotone to Gent during the 2017-18 season. The loan ended and Dussenne was now sold to Excel Mouscron.)
17 August 2018	Łukasz Teodorczyk	Anderlecht	Udinese	Undisclosed	
18 August 2018	Manuel Benson	Genk	Excel Mouscron	Loan	
19 August 2018	Duje Čop	Standard Liège	Valladolid	Loan	
19 August 2018	Yuya Kubo	Gent	1. FC Nürnberg	Loan	
20 August 2018	Felipe Avenatti	Bologna	Kortrijk	Loan	
20 August 2018	Marko Bakić	Braga	Excel Mouscron	Loan	
20 August 2018	Jérémy Huyghebaert	Excel Mouscron	Neuchâtel Xamax	Loan	
20 August 2018	Héctor Rodas	Cercle Brugge	Alcorcón	Loan	
20 August 2018	Jacques Zoua	Beerschot Wilrijk	Free Agent	Released	
21 August 2018	Kurt Abrahams	Sint-Truiden	Westerlo	Undisclosed	
21 August 2018	Laurens De Bock	Leeds United	Oostende	Loan	
21 August 2018	Abdoulay Diaby	Club Brugge	Sporting Lisbon	Undisclosed	
21 August 2018	Anthony Limbombe	Club Brugge	Nantes	Undisclosed	
21 August 2018	Yuta Koike	Ryutsu Keizai University	Sint-Truiden	Undisclosed	
21 August 2018	Josué Sá	Anderlecht	Kasımpaşa	Loan	
22 August 2018	Anderson Arroyo	Liverpool	Gent	Loan	
22 August 2018	Rocky Bushiri	Oostende	Eupen	Loan	
22 August 2018	Charis Charisis	PAOK	Kortrijk	Loan	(Note: Charisis was on loan from PAOK to Sint-Truiden during the 2017-18 season. The loan ended and PAOK was now loaned to Kortrijk.)
22 August 2018	Samuel Essende	Paris Saint-Germain Academy	Eupen	Loan	
22 August 2018	Mijat Marić	Lokeren	Lugano	Undisclosed	
22 August 2018	Victor Osimhen	VfL Wolfsburg	Charleroi	Loan	
22 August 2018	Kaveh Rezaei	Charleroi	Club Brugge	Undisclosed	
23 August 2018	Joseph Akpala	Oostende	Al-Faisaly	Free	
23 August 2018	Marius Noubissi	Ilves	Beerschot Wilrijk	Undisclosed	
23 August 2018	Octávio	Beerschot Wilrijk	Free Agent	Released	
23 August 2018	Obbi Oularé	Watford	Standard Liège	Loan	(Note: Oularé was on loan from Watford to Antwerp during the 2017-18 season. The loan ended and Oularé was now loaned to Standard Liège.)
23 August 2018	Jordy Peffer	Mechelen	Dessel Sport	Loan	(Note: Peffer was on loan from Mechelen to Westerlo during the 2017-18 season. The loan ended and Peffer was now loaned to Dessel Sport.)
24 August 2018	Sofyan Amrabat	Feyenoord	Club Brugge	Undisclosed	
24 August 2018	Lewis Enoh	Lokeren	Politehnica Iași	Undisclosed	
24 August 2018	Javier García Guillén	Cercle Brugge	Free Agent	Released	
24 August 2018	Christophe Vincent	Cercle Brugge	Free Agent	Released	
25 August 2018	Olivier Deschacht	Anderlecht	Lokeren	Free	
25 August 2018	Jordy Lokando	OH Leuven	RWDM47	Free	(Note: Lokando was on loan from OH Leuven to Heist during the 2017–18 season. After the loan ended, Lokando was released to RWDM47.)
25 August 2018	Dieumerci Mbokani	Dynamo Kyiv	Antwerp	Free	
26 August 2018	Timothy Derijck	Zulte Waregem	Gent	Undisclosed	
27 August 2018	Ramin Rezaeian	Oostende	Free Agent	Released	
28 August 2018	Mathias Bossaerts	Oostende	NEC	Undisclosed	
28 August 2018	Ivan Fiolić	Dinamo Zagreb	Genk	Undisclosed	
28 August 2018	Faïz Selemani	Lorient	Union SG	Undisclosed	
29 August 2018	Stephen Buyl	Cercle Brugge	Westerlo	Undisclosed	(Note: Buyl was on loan from Cercle Brugge to Westerlo during the second half of the 2017-18 season. All parties agreed to make the transfer permanent.)
29 August 2018	Amine Khammas	Genk	Den Bosch	Loan	
29 August 2018	James Lawrence	Trenčín	Anderlecht	Undisclosed	
29 August 2018	Mbaye Leye	Eupen	Excel Mouscron	Free	
29 August 2018	Hao Zhang	Beijing Renhe	Standard Liège	Undisclosed	
30 August 2018	Ernest Agyiri	Manchester City	Tubize	Loan	
30 August 2018	Amara Baby	Charleroi	Antwerp	Undisclosed	
30 August 2018	Michiel Jaeken	Westerlo	Dessel Sport	Loan	
30 August 2018	Kara Mbodji	Anderlecht	Nantes	Loan	
30 August 2018	Robert Mühren	Zulte Waregem	NAC Breda	Loan	(Note: Mühren was on loan from Zulte Waregem to Sparta Rotterdam during the 2017-18 season. The loan ended and Mühren was now loaned to NAC Breda.)
30 August 2018	Lior Refaelov	Club Brugge	Antwerp	Undisclosed	
30 August 2018	José Luis Rodríguez	Gent	Deportivo Alavés	Undisclosed	
30 August 2018	Konstantinos Rougalas	Westerlo	Doxa Dramas	Undisclosed	
30 August 2018	Willy Semedo	Charleroi	Roeselare	Loan	
30 August 2018	Anthony Swolfs	Gent	Waasland-Beveren	Loan	
30 August 2018	Joachim Van Damme	Waasland-Beveren	Mechelen	Undisclosed	
31 August 2018	Gabriele Angella	Udinese	Charleroi	Loan	
31 August 2018	Fabien Antunes	Sint-Truiden	Westerlo	Loan	
31 August 2018	Mohammed Aoulad	Wydad	Roeselare	Undisclosed	
31 August 2018	Philip Azango	Trenčín	Gent	Undisclosed	
31 August 2018	Nelson Balongo	Boavista	Sint-Truiden	Undisclosed	
31 August 2018	Fatos Bećiraj	Mechelen	Free Agent	Released	
31 August 2018	Samy Bourard	Sint-Truiden	Eindhoven	Undisclosed	
31 August 2018	Massimo Bruno	RB Leipzig	Charleroi	Undisclosed	(Note: Bruno was on loan from Leipzig to Anderlecht during the 2017–18 season. The loan ended and Bruno was now sold to Charleroi.)
31 August 2018	Sander Coopman	Club Brugge	Oostende	Undisclosed	(Note: Coopman was on loan from Club Brugge to Zulte Waregem during the 2017–18 season. The loan ended and Coopman was now sold to Oostende.)
31 August 2018	Julien De Sart	Middlesbrough	Kortrijk	Undisclosed	(Note: De Sart was on loan from Middlesbrough to Zulte Waregem during the 2017–18 season. The loan ended and De Sart was now sold to Kortrijk.)
31 August 2018	Tom De Sutter	Lokeren	Free Agent	Released	
31 August 2018	Yves De Winter	Roeselare	Antwerp	Undisclosed	
31 August 2018	Mamadou Fall	Charleroi	Eupen	Loan	
31 August 2018	Thomas Foket	Gent	Reims	Undisclosed	
31 August 2018	Nader Ghandri	Antwerp	Westerlo	Loan	
31 August 2018	Paul Gladon	Wolverhampton Wanderers	Sint-Truiden	Loan	
31 August 2018	Kylian Hazard	Chelsea	Cercle Brugge	Loan	
31 August 2018	David Henen	Everton	Charleroi	Free	
31 August 2018	Daichi Kamada	Eintracht Frankfurt	Sint-Truiden	Loan	
31 August 2018	Bartosz Kapustka	Leicester City	OH Leuven	Loan	
31 August 2018	Nikos Karelis	Genk	PAOK	Loan	
31 August 2018	Abel Kasong	TP Mazembe	Kortrijk	Loan	
31 August 2018	Prince Kasongo	TP Mazembe	Kortrijk	Loan	
31 August 2018	Redouane Kerrouche	Paris	OH Leuven	Undisclosed	
31 August 2018	Gilles Lentz	Kortrijk	Roeselare	Free	
31 August 2018	Sulayman Marreh	Watford	Eupen	Loan	
31 August 2018	Ryan Mmaee	Standard Liège	AGF	Loan	(Note: Mmaee was on loan from Standard to Waasland-Beveren during the 2017–18 season. The loan ended and Mmaee was now loaned to AGF.)
31 August 2018	Freddy Mombongo-Dues	Union SG	Patro Eisden Maasmechelen	Free	(Note: Mombongo-Dues was on loan from Union SG to RFC Liège during the 2017–18 season. After the loan ended, Mombongo-Dues was released by Union SG, allowing him to move as a free agent player to Patro Esden Maasmechelen.)
31 August 2018	Cherif Ndiaye	Waasland-Beveren	Free Agent	Released	
31 August 2018	Aaron Nemane	Manchester City	Tubize	Loan	
31 August 2018	Adama Niane	Troyes	Charleroi	Undisclosed	
31 August 2018	Nicolas Rajsel	Oostende	Roeselare	Loan	
31 August 2018	Florian Raspentino	Eupen	Free Agent	Released	
31 August 2018	Bubacarr Sanneh	Midtjylland	Anderlecht	Undisclosed	
31 August 2018	Arnaud Souquet	Nice	Gent	Undisclosed	
31 August 2018	Ahmed Touba	Club Brugge	OH Leuven	Loan	
31 August 2018	Ricardo van Rhijn	Club Brugge	AZ	Undisclosed	(Note: Van Rhijn was already on loan from Club Brugge to AZ during the 2017-18 season. All parties agreed to make the transfer permanent.)
31 August 2018	Apostolos Vellios	Nottingham Forest	Waasland-Beveren	Loan	

=== September 2018 ===
Date	Name	Moving from	Moving to	Fee	Note
2 September 2018	Karel Van Roose	Cercle Brugge	Wingene	Loan	(Note: Van Roose was on loan from Cercle Brugge to Torhout during the 2017-18 season. The loan ended and Van Roose was now loaned to Wingene.)
7 September 2018	Ofir Davidzada	Gent	Maccabi Tel Aviv	Undisclosed	(Note: Davidzada was already on loan from Gent to Maccabi Tel Aviv during the 2017-18 season. All parties agreed to make the transfer permanent.)

== Sorted by team ==
=== Belgian First Division A teams ===
==== Anderlecht ====
In:

No.	Pos.	Nation	Player
—	FW	ALB	Kristal Abazaj (from Skënderbeu Korçë)
—	MF	SRB	Luka Adžić (from Red Star Belgrade)
—	MF	BEL	Zakaria Bakkali (from Valencia)
—	DF	BEL	Elias Cobbaut (from Mechelen)
—	GK	FRA	Thomas Didillon (from Metz)
—	FW	BEL	Landry Dimata (on loan from VfL Wolfsburg)
—	DF	WAL	James Lawrence (from Trenčín)
—	DF	UKR	Yevhen Makarenko (from Kortrijk)
—	DF	CRO	Antonio Milić (from Oostende)
—	GK	BEL	Ilias Moutha-Sebtaoui (from Manchester United)
—	FW	ZIM	Knowledge Musona (from Oostende)
—	MF	USA	Kenny Saief (was on loan from Gent, now bought)
—	DF	GAM	Bubacarr Sanneh (from Midtjylland)
—	FW	CRO	Ivan Santini (from Caen)
—	DF	BIH	Ognjen Vranješ (from AEK Athens)

Out:

No.	Pos.	Nation	Player
1	GK	BEL	Matz Sels (loan return to Newcastle United)
2	DF	POR	Josué Sá (on loan to Kasımpaşa)
3	DF	BEL	Olivier Deschacht (to Lokeren)
4	DF	SEN	Kara Mbodji (on loan to Nantes)
5	DF	SRB	Uroš Spajić (to Krasnodar)
9	FW	NGR	Henry Onyekuru (loan return to Everton)
11	MF	ROU	Alexandru Chipciu (on loan to Sparta Prague)
17	MF	BEL	Massimo Bruno (loan return to RB Leipzig)
32	MF	BEL	Leander Dendoncker (on loan to Wolverhampton Wanderers)
35	FW	CGO	Silvère Ganvoula M'boussy (on loan to VfL Bochum)
50	MF	SRB	Lazar Marković (loan return to Liverpool)
91	FW	POL	Łukasz Teodorczyk (to Udinese)
—	MF	SEN	Stéphane Badji (was on loan to Kayserispor, now sold to Bursaspor)
—	MF	BEL	Antoine Bernier (to Antwerp)
—	GK	BEL	Enzo D'Alberto (to Union SG)
—	MF	CIV	Idrissa Doumbia (was on loan to Zulte Waregem, now sold to Akhmat Grozny)
—	DF	BEL	Wout Faes (was on loan to Excelsior, now sold to Oostende)
—	FW	SWE	Isaac Kiese Thelin (was on loan to Waasland-Beveren, now loaned to Bayer Leverkusen)
—	FW	BEL	Dylan Lambrecth (was on loan to Waremme, now released)
—	FW	BEL	Aaron Leya Iseka (was on loan to Zulte Waregem, now sold to Toulouse)
—	MF	BEL	Eliot Matazo (to Monaco)
—	FW	BEL	Aristote Nkaka (signed from Oostende, then loaned back)
—	GK	BEL	Davy Roef (again on loan to Waasland-Beveren)
—	MF	EGY	Trezeguet (was on loan to Kasımpaşa, now sold)
—	FW	BEL	Jorn Vancamp (was on loan to Roda JC, now sold to Beerschot Wilrijk)

==== Antwerp ====
In:

No.	Pos.	Nation	Player
—	MF	SEN	Amara Baby (from Charleroi)
—	MF	BEL	Antoine Bernier (from Anderlecht)
—	FW	COD	Jonathan Bolingi (from Standard Liège)
—	DF	POR	Aurélio Buta (was on loan from Benfica, now bought)
—	GK	BEL	Yves De Winter (from Roeselare)
—	MF	MEX	Omar Govea (on loan from Porto)
—	DF	NOR	Simen Juklerød (from Vålerenga)
—	MF	CMR	Didier Lamkel Zé (from Chamois Niortais)
—	DF	BRA	Matheus (was on loan from Londrina, now bought)
—	FW	COD	Dieumerci Mbokani (from Dynamo Kyiv)
—	DF	GHA	Daniel Opare (from FC Augsburg)
—	DF	MAD	Zotsara Randriambololona (loan return from Roeselare)
—	MF	ISR	Lior Refaelov (from Club Brugge)
—	FW	POR	Ivo Rodrigues (was on loan from Porto, now bought)
—	GK	BEL	Jens Teunckens (was on loan from Club Brugge, now bought)
—	MF	MLI	Sambou Yatabaré (was on loan from Werder Bremen, now bought)

Out:

No.	Pos.	Nation	Player
9	MF	BEL	Stallone Limbombe (to Gent)
10	MF	FRA	Romain Habran (released)
12	MF	CMR	Sébastien Siani (to Al Jazira)
16	DF	SEN	Moustapha Bayal Sall (released)
18	MF	TUN	Nader Ghandri (on loan to Westerlo)
23	FW	URU	Joaquín Ardaiz (loan return to El Tanque Sisley)
24	DF	BEL	Ritchie De Laet (loan return to Aston Villa)
25	DF	BEL	Alexander Corryn (loan return to Mechelen)
28	FW	ESP	Roberto (end of contract)
31	MF	BIH	Tino-Sven Sušić (to VVV)
58	FW	BEL	Obbi Oularé (loan return to Watford)
89	GK	BEL	Kevin Debaty (to Waasland-Beveren)
99	MF	BFA	Jonathan Pitroipa (to Paris)
—	MF	BEL	Younes Achter (to City Pirates)

==== Cercle Brugge ====
In:

No.	Pos.	Nation	Player
—	FW	FRA	Nabil Alioui (on loan from Monaco)
—	MF	FRA	Kévin Appin (on loan from Monaco)
—	MF	BEL	Adrien Bongiovanni (on loan from Monaco)
—	FW	FRA	Irvin Cardona (again on loan from Monaco)
—	DF	FRA	Yoann Etienne (on loan from Monaco)
—	MF	BEL	Kylian Hazard (on loan from Chelsea)
—	MF	CIV	Franck Irie (from Monaco)
—	MF	BEL	Andi Koshi (from PSV)
—	MF	FRA	Arnaud Lusamba (on loan from Nice)
—	GK	FRA	Paul Nardi (again on loan from Monaco)
—	DF	CMR	Pierre-Daniel N'Guinda (on loan from Monaco)
—	DF	KEN	Aboud Omar (from Slavia Sofia)
—	MF	FRA	Guévin Tormin (again on loan from Monaco)
—	DF	JPN	Naomichi Ueda (from Kashima Antlers)
—	MF	BRA	Vitinho (from Cruzeiro)

Out:

No.	Pos.	Nation	Player
3	DF	BEL	Wesley Vanbelle (on loan to Lommel)
4	MF	FRA	Tristan Muyumba (loan return to Monaco)
6	MF	FRA	Christophe Vincent (released)
12	MF	BRA	Crysan (loan return to Atlético Paranaense)
13	DF	ESP	Héctor Rodas (on loan to Alcorcón)
20	MF	ESP	Javier García Guillén (released)
21	DF	NGR	Elderson Echiéjilé (loan return to Monaco)
24	MF	BEL	Guillaume De Schryver (to Westerlo)
25	DF	FRA	Jordy Gaspar (loan return to Monaco)
27	DF	BEN	Emmanuel Imorou (loan return to Caen)
—	DF	HAI	Carlens Arcus (was on loan to Auxerre, now sold)
—	FW	BEL	Stephen Buyl (was on loan to Westerlo, now sold)
—	DF	BEL	Niels Coussement (was on loan to Knokke, now released to Zwevezele)
—	MF	BEL	Karel Van Roose (was on loan to Torhout, now loaned to Wingene)

==== Charleroi ====
In:

No.	Pos.	Nation	Player
—	DF	ITA	Gabriele Angella (on loan from Udinese)
—	DF	FRA	Benjamin Boulenger (loan return from OH Leuven)
—	MF	BEL	Massimo Bruno (from RB Leipzig)
—	DF	FRA	Dorian Dervite (from Bolton Wanderers)
—	MF	IRI	Ali Gholizadeh (from Saipa)
—	MF	BEL	David Henen (from Everton)
—	FW	BEL	François Maistriaux (from Couvin-Mariembourg)
—	FW	MLI	Adama Niane (from Troyes)
—	DF	IRI	Omid Noorafkan (from Esteghlal)
—	FW	NGR	Victor Osimhen (on loan from VfL Wolfsburg)
—	FW	FRA	Jérémy Perbet (from Club Brugge)
—	DF	BEL	Ethan Poulain (loan return from La Louvière Centre)
—	GK	FRA	Rémi Riou (from Alanyaspor)

Out:

No.	Pos.	Nation	Player
2	DF	BEL	Anthony D'Alberto (loan return to Braga B)
9	FW	IRI	Kaveh Rezaei (to Club Brugge)
10	FW	BEL	David Pollet (on loan to Eupen)
18	MF	SEN	Amara Baby (to Antwerp)
19	MF	FRA	Willy Semedo (on loan to Roeselare)
77	MF	SEN	Mamadou Fall (on loan to Eupen)
99	FW	CIV	Chris Bedia (on loan to Zulte Waregem)
—	DF	ANG	Clinton Mata (was on loan to Genk, now sold to Club Brugge)
—	FW	FRA	Florent Stevance (was on loan to Tubize, now sold to Tours)

==== Club Brugge ====
In:

No.	Pos.	Nation	Player
—	MF	MAR	Sofyan Amrabat (from Feyenoord)
—	MF	NED	Arnaut Groeneveld (from NEC)
—	GK	CRO	Karlo Letica (from Hajduk Split)
—	DF	ANG	Clinton Mata (from Charleroi)
—	DF	CRO	Matej Mitrović (was on loan from Beşiktaş, now bought)
—	DF	BRA	Luan Peres Petroni (from Ituano)
—	FW	IRI	Kaveh Rezaei (from Charleroi)
—	MF	BEL	Mats Rits (from Mechelen)
—	MF	BEL	Siebe Schrijvers (from Genk)

Out:

No.	Pos.	Nation	Player
3	MF	BEL	Timmy Simons (retired)
6	MF	NED	Jordy Clasie (loan return to Southampton)
8	MF	ISR	Lior Refaelov (to Antwerp)
10	FW	MLI	Abdoulay Diaby (to Sporting Lisbon)
13	DF	DEN	Alexander Scholz (to Midtjylland)
17	MF	BEL	Anthony Limbombe (to Nantes)
32	GK	NED	Kenneth Vermeer (loan return to Feyenoord)
40	MF	BEL	Jordi Vanlerberghe (on loan to Oostende)
55	MF	SRB	Erhan Mašović (on loan to Trenčín)
96	MF	BEL	Ahmed Touba (on loan to OH Leuven)
—	MF	NED	Elton Acolatse (was on loan to Sint-Truiden, now sold)
—	GK	BEL	Lucas Alfieri (to Tubize)
—	FW	CRO	Fran Brodić (was on loan to Catania, now sold)
—	MF	BEL	Sander Coopman (was on loan to Zulte Waregem, now sold to Oostende)
—	MF	TUR	Murad Han Gönen (to Tubize)
—	DF	BEL	Laurent Lemoine (was on loan to Roeselare, now sold to Mechelen)
—	MF	BEL	Senne Lynen (was on loan to Telstar, now sold)
—	MF	AUS	Riley McGree (was on loan to Newcastle Jets, now loaned to Melbourne City)
—	FW	FRA	Jérémy Perbet (was on loan to Kortrijk, now sold to Charleroi)
—	FW	BRA	Leandro Pereira (was on loan to Sport Recife, now loaned to Chapecoense)
—	DF	BEL	Tibo Persyn (to Inter Milan)
—	MF	ESP	Tomás Pina Isla (was on loan to Alavés, now sold)
—	MF	ROU	Dorin Rotariu (was on loan to Excel Mouscron, now loaned to AZ)
—	FW	BEL	Nikola Storm (was on loan to OH Leuven, now sold to Mechelen)
—	GK	BEL	Jens Teunckens (was on loan to Antwerp, now sold)
—	MF	BEL	Jellert van Landschoot (was on loan to Eindhoven, now loaned to OH Leuven)
—	DF	NED	Ricardo van Rhijn (was on loan to AZ, now sold)
—	FW	BEL	Dennis Van Vaerenbergh (was on loan to Eindhoven, now sold to Dender EH)
—	DF	BEL	Niels Verburgh (was on loan to Waasland-Beveren, now sold to Roda JC)

==== Eupen ====
In:

No.	Pos.	Nation	Player
—	DF	SEN	Souleymane Aw (loan return from Roeselare)
—	DF	BEL	Rocky Bushiri (on loan from Oostende)
—	FW	FRA	Samuel Essende (on loan from Paris Saint-Germain Academy)
—	MF	SEN	Mamadou Fall (on loan from Charleroi)
—	DF	MLI	Cheick Keita (on loan from Birmingham City)
—	MF	BEL	Mégan Laurent (from Lierse)
—	MF	GAM	Sulayman Marreh (on loan from Watford)
—	MF	BIH	Danijel Milićević (from Gent)
—	DF	ESP	Xavi Molina (from Gimnàstic)
—	MF	ESP	Mario Ortiz Ruiz (from Cultural Leonesa)
—	FW	BEL	David Pollet (on loan from Charleroi)
—	DF	IRI	Morteza Pouraliganji (from Al Sadd)
—	DF	GER	Julian Schauerte (from Fortuna Düsseldorf)
—	FW	ARM	Ivan Yagan (from Lierse)

Out:

No.	Pos.	Nation	Player
3	DF	FRA	Mathieu Peybernes (loan return to Lorient)
7	FW	CIV	Mamadou Koné (loan return to Leganés)
9	FW	SEN	Mbaye Leye (to Excel Mouscron)
13	FW	BEL	Damien Mouchamps (to RFC Liège)
15	DF	SEN	Moussa Wagué (to Barcelona B)
19	FW	FRA	Florian Raspentino (released)
23	DF	BEL	Mickaël Tirpan (to Lokeren)
25	MF	NGR	Odeni George (end of contract)
44	DF	ESP	Marc Valiente (to Partizan)
—	FW	FRA	Nicolas Verdier (was on loan to Mechelen, then released to Laval)

==== Excel Mouscron ====
In:

No.	Pos.	Nation	Player
—	MF	MNE	Marko Bakić (on loan from Braga)
—	MF	BEL	Manuel Benson (on loan from Genk)
—	GK	FRA	Jean Butez (was on loan from Lille, now bought)
—	DF	SRB	Aleksa Damjanac (from Mallorca B)
—	DF	BEL	Noë Dussenne (from Crotone)
—	DF	GRE	Alexandros Katranis (on loan from Saint-Étienne)
—	MF	BIH	Mićo Kuzmanović (from Sarajevo)
—	FW	SEN	Mbaye Leye (from Eupen)
—	MF	SRB	Luka Luković (from Bačka)
—	MF	COL	Jesús Marimón (from Once Caldas)
—	MF	BEL	Luca Napoleone (from Heist)
—	FW	HAI	Frantzdy Pierrot (from Colorado Rapids)
—	FW	POR	Idrisa Sambú (on loan from Spartak Moscow)

Out:

No.	Pos.	Nation	Player
4	DF	FRA	Teddy Mézague (end of contract)
6	MF	MEX	Omar Govea (loan return to Porto)
10	FW	COD	Jonathan Bolingi (loan return to Standard Liège)
18	FW	NGR	Taiwo Awoniyi (loan return to Liverpool)
22	DF	BEL	Sébastien Locigno (end of contract)
28	DF	BEL	Jérémy Huyghebaert (on loan to Neuchâtel Xamax)
95	MF	ROU	Dorin Rotariu (loan return to Club Brugge)
—	DF	BIH	Daniel Graovac (was on loan to Željezničar, now sold to Vojvodina)
—	GK	BRA	Vagner (was on loan to Boavista, now sold to Qarabağ)

==== Genk ====
In:

No.	Pos.	Nation	Player
—	MF	BEL	Matisse Didden (from Patro Eisden Maasmechelen)
—	MF	CRO	Ivan Fiolić (from Dinamo Zagreb)
—	FW	BEL	Zinho Gano (from Oostende)
—	DF	COL	Jhon Lucumí (from Deportivo Cali)
—	MF	COD	Dieumerci Ndongala (was on loan from Standard Liège, now bought)
—	MF	GHA	Joseph Paintsil (from Ferencváros)
—	MF	POL	Jakub Piotrowski (from Pogoń Szczecin)
—	DF	ROU	Vladimir Screciu (from Universitatea Craiova)

Out:

No.	Pos.	Nation	Player
2	DF	CZE	Jakub Brabec (on loan Çaykur Rizespor)
5	DF	BEL	Amine Khammas (on loan to Den Bosch)
7	FW	GRE	Nikos Karelis (on loan to PAOK)
15	DF	GAM	Omar Colley (to Sampdoria)
16	MF	BEL	Dante Vanzeir (on loan to Beerschot Wilrijk)
17	FW	BEL	Holly Tshimanga (end of contract)
19	MF	BEL	Thomas Buffel (to Zulte Waregem)
20	MF	BEL	Paolo Sabak (to NEC)
22	MF	BEL	Siebe Schrijvers (to Club Brugge)
27	DF	ANG	Clinton Mata (loan return to Charleroi)
29	MF	BEL	Manuel Benson (on loan to Excel Mouscron)
33	MF	CIV	Pierre Zebli (on loan to Ascoli)
40	GK	BEL	Gaëtan Coucke (on loan to Lommel)
—	DF	BEL	Kino Delorge (was on loan to Dordrecht, now sold to Dinamo București)
—	DF	BEL	Christophe Janssens (was on loan to MVV, now sold to Westerlo)
—	DF	ESP	José Manuel García Naranjo (was on loan to Leganés, now sold to Tenerife)

==== Gent ====
In:

No.	Pos.	Nation	Player
—	DF	COL	Anderson Arroyo (on loan from Liverpool)
—	FW	NGR	Taiwo Awoniyi (on loan from Liverpool)
—	MF	NGR	Philip Azango (from Trenčín)
—	GK	BEL	Colin Coosemans (from Mechelen)
—	GK	BEL	Jari De Busser (from Lierse)
—	DF	BEL	Timothy Derijck (from Zulte Waregem)
—	MF	FRA	Jean-Luc Dompé (from Standard Liège)
—	FW	GEO	Giorgi Kvilitaia (from Rapid Wien)
—	MF	USA	Ben Lederman (from Barcelona Juvenil A)
—	MF	BEL	Stallone Limbombe (from Antwerp)
—	MF	EGY	Ahmed Mostafa (from Petrojet)
—	MF	BEL	Vadis Odjidja-Ofoe (from Olympiacos)
—	DF	UKR	Ihor Plastun (from Ludogorets Razgrad)
—	MF	SWE	Eric Smith (from Norrköping)
—	DF	FRA	Arnaud Souquet (from Nice)
—	MF	SWE	Tesfaldet Tekie (loan return from Östersund)

Out:

No.	Pos.	Nation	Player
2	DF	FRA	Samuel Gigot (to Spartak Moscow)
5	DF	BEL	Noë Dussenne (loan return to Crotone)
8	MF	DEN	Anders Christiansen (to Malmö)
9	FW	SEN	Mamadou Sylla Diallo (on loan to Zulte Waregem)
11	MF	COL	Deiver Machado (on loan to Atlético Nacional)
13	DF	SRB	Stefan Mitrović (to Strasbourg)
14	FW	CUW	Rangelo Janga (to Astana)
18	MF	NGR	Samuel Kalu (to Bordeaux)
27	MF	NGR	Moses Simon (to Levante)
31	FW	JPN	Yuya Kubo (on loan to 1. FC Nürnberg)
32	MF	BEL	Thomas Foket (to Reims)
38	DF	BEL	Siebe Horemans (on loan to Excelsior)
—	MF	GEO	Giorgi Beridze (was on loan to Trenčín, now loaned to Újpest)
—	DF	ISR	Ofir Davidzada (was on loan to Maccabi Tel Aviv, now sold)
—	MF	ISR	Lior Inbrum (was on loan to Ashdod, now loaned to Beitar Jerusalem)
—	FW	BEL	Elton Kabangu (again on loan to Eindhoven)
—	MF	BIH	Danijel Milićević (was on loan to Metz, now sold to Eupen)
—	FW	NGR	Peter Olayinka (was on loan to Zulte Waregem, now sold to Slavia Prague)
—	FW	PAN	José Luis Rodríguez (to Deportivo Alavés)
—	MF	USA	Kenny Saief (was on loan to Anderlecht, now sold)
—	DF	SEN	Noël Soumah (was on loan to Westerlo, now sold)
—	GK	BEL	Anthony Swolfs (on loan to Waasland-Beveren)

==== Kortrijk ====
In:

No.	Pos.	Nation	Player
—	FW	URU	Felipe Avenatti (on loan from Bologna)
—	DF	UKR	Andriy Batsula (from Oleksandriya)
—	DF	SEN	Alioune Camara (from Iyane Matam)
—	DF	GRE	Charis Charisis (on loan from PAOK)
—	MF	BEL	Julien De Sart (from Middlesbrough)
—	GK	BEL	Jarno De Smet (from Lommel)
—	FW	NGR	Imoh Ezekiel (from Las Palmas)
—	DF	SRB	Petar Golubović (from Novara)
—	DF	USA	Brendan Hines-Ike (from Örebro)
—	MF	BRA	Kanu (from Omonia)
—	MF	COD	Abel Kasong (on loan from TP Mazembe)
—	DF	COD	Prince Kasongo (on loan from TP Mazembe)
—	FW	BEL	Ilombe Mboyo (from Sion)
—	DF	IRI	Mohammad Naderi (from Tractor Sazi)
—	MF	CIV	Jean Marco Toualy (from Salitas)

Out:

No.	Pos.	Nation	Player
3	DF	UKR	Yevhen Makarenko (to Anderlecht)
7	MF	BEL	Stijn De Smet (to Roeselare)
10	FW	GRE	Thanasis Papazoglou (to Hapoel Haifa)
12	DF	USA	Erik Palmer-Brown (loan return to Manchester City)
23	DF	BEL	Bryan Verboom (loan return to Zulte Waregem)
43	FW	FRA	Jérémy Perbet (loan return to Club Brugge)
—	DF	ALG	Youcef Attal (was on loan from Paradou, then bought, then sold to Nice)
—	DF	BEL	Lennert De Smul (was on loan to Deinze, then released)
—	MF	COD	Hervé Kage (was on loan to Kardemir Karabükspor, now loaned to Adana Demirspor)
—	FW	BEL	Michaël Lallemand (was on loan to Deinze, then released)
—	GK	BEL	Gilles Lentz (to Roeselare)
—	MF	SEN	Sidy Sarr (was on loan to Châteauroux, then released)
—	MF	BEL	Lukas Van Eenoo (was on loan to Westerlo, now sold)

==== Lokeren ====
In:

No.	Pos.	Nation	Player
—	DF	ISR	Omri Ben Harush (from Maccabi Haifa)
—	DF	BEL	Olivier Deschacht (from Anderlecht)
—	DF	SEN	Bambo Diaby (from Sampdoria)
—	FW	SRB	Đorđe Jovanović (from Partizan)
—	GK	BEL	Robin Mantel (from ASV Geel)
—	FW	BLR	Anton Saroka (from Dinamo Minsk)
—	DF	CRO	Mario Tičinović (loan return from Hajduk Split)
—	DF	BEL	Mickaël Tirpan (from Eupen)

Out:

No.	Pos.	Nation	Player
5	DF	SUI	Mijat Marić (to Lugano)
9	FW	BEL	Tom De Sutter (released)
15	FW	NOR	Mohamed Ofkir (to Sandefjord)
18	FW	NOR	Jean Alassane Mendy (released)
27	FW	SWE	Robin Söder (to Göteborg)
29	FW	CMR	Lewis Enoh (to Politehnica Iași)
30	GK	BEL	Bo Geens (end of contract)
33	FW	BEL	Joran Triest (to Hamme)
—	GK	BEL	Dieter Creemers (to Lommel)
—	MF	CRO	Nikola Jambor (was on loan to Osijek, now sold to Rio Ave)
—	MF	FRA	Samy Kehli (was on loan to OH Leuven, now sold)
—	DF	SVK	Branislav Niňaj (was on loan to Žilina, now sold to Fortuna Sittard)
—	MF	NED	Luciano Slagveer (was on loan to Twente, now loaned to Emmen)

==== Oostende ====
In:

No.	Pos.	Nation	Player
—	MF	BEL	Indy Boonen (from Manchester United)
—	MF	BEL	Sander Coopman (from Club Brugge)
—	DF	BEL	Laurens De Bock (on loan from Leeds United)
—	DF	BEL	Wout Faes (from Anderlecht)
—	FW	ALB	Sindrit Guri (from Kukësi)
—	MF	BEL	François Marquet (from Waasland-Beveren)
—	DF	CRO	Goran Milović (from Chongqing Dangdai Lifan)
—	FW	BEL	Aristote Nkaka (sold to Anderlecht, then loaned back)
—	GK	CMR	Fabrice Ondoa (from Sevilla Atlético)
—	FW	ZAM	Fashion Sakala (from Spartak Moscow)
—	MF	BEL	Jordi Vanlerberghe (on loan from Club Brugge)

Out:

No.	Pos.	Nation	Player
3	DF	BEL	Rocky Bushiri (on loan to Eupen)
4	DF	BEL	Mathias Bossaerts (to NEC)
10	MF	FRA	Franck Berrier (to Mechelen)
11	FW	ZIM	Knowledge Musona (to Anderlecht)
15	MF	RSA	Andile Jali (released)
17	FW	NGR	Joseph Akpala (to Al-Faisaly)
18	DF	CZE	David Rozehnal (retired)
21	GK	BEL	Mike Vanhamel (to Beerschot Wilrijk)
23	DF	IRI	Ramin Rezaeian (released)
31	MF	SLO	Nicolas Rajsel (on loan to Roeselare)
44	DF	CRO	Antonio Milić (to Anderlecht)
93	FW	BEL	Zinho Gano (to Genk)
—	MF	BEL	Victor Vandewiele (end of contract)

==== Sint-Truiden ====
In:

No.	Pos.	Nation	Player
—	MF	NED	Elton Acolatse (was on loan from Club Brugge, now bought)
—	FW	COD	Nelson Balongo (from Boavista)
—	FW	SLE	Mohamed Buya Turay (from Dalkurd)
—	MF	BEL	Alexandre De Bruyn (from Lommel)
—	DF	JPN	Wataru Endo (from Urawa Red Diamonds)
—	DF	ESP	Pol García (from Juventus)
—	FW	NED	Paul Gladon (on loan from Wolverhampton Wanderers)
—	FW	BEL	Wolke Janssens (loan return from Lierse)
—	MF	JPN	Daichi Kamada (on loan from Eintracht Frankfurt)
—	DF	JPN	Yuta Koike (from Ryutsu Keizai University)
—	DF	BEL	Samy Mmaee (from Standard Liège)
—	FW	HAI	Duckens Nazon (from Wolverhampton Wanderers)
—	MF	BEL	Steve Ryckaert (loan return from Tubize)
—	MF	JPN	Takahiro Sekine (on loan from Ingolstadt 04)
—	MF	GUI	Ibrahima Sory Sankhon (from Horoya)
—	MF	BEL	Iebe Swers (loan return from Lommel)
—	DF	BRA	Thallyson (from Novorizontino)

Out:

No.	Pos.	Nation	Player
8	DF	GRE	Charis Charisis (loan return to PAOK)
9	FW	SEN	Babacar Guèye (loan return to Hannover 96)
14	MF	ANG	Igor Vetokele (loan return to Charlton Athletic)
15	DF	GRE	Stelios Kitsiou (loan return to PAOK)
18	DF	FRA	Fabien Antunes (on loan to Westerlo)
25	FW	RSA	Kurt Abrahams (to Westerlo)
28	DF	GRE	Dimitrios Goutas (loan return to Olympiacos)
30	MF	BEL	Samy Bourard (to Eindhoven)
32	FW	ENG	Chuba Akpom (loan return to Arsenal)
—	FW	BEL	Lucas Damblon (was on loan to RWDM47, now sold to Rupel Boom)
—	MF	MAR	Yassine Salah (loan return to Union SG)

==== Standard Liège ====
In:

No.	Pos.	Nation	Player
—	MF	BEL	Samuel Bastien (from Chievo Verona)
—	MF	MAR	Mehdi Carcela (was on loan from Granada, now bought)
—	DF	BEL	Luis Pedro Cavanda (was on loan from Galatasaray, now bought)
—	DF	SRB	Miloš Kosanović (loan return from Göztepe)
—	DF	CYP	Konstantinos Laifis (was on loan from Olympiacos, now bought)
—	MF	BEL	Maxime Lestienne (from Rubin Kazan)
—	DF	BEL	Senna Miangue (on loan from Cagliari)
—	FW	BEL	Obbi Oularé (on loan from Watford)
—	FW	POR	Orlando Sá (from Henan Jianye)
—	DF	BEL	Zinho Vanheusden (again on loan from Internazionale)
—	MF	CHN	Hao Zhang (from Beijing Renhe)

Out:

No.	Pos.	Nation	Player
4	DF	BEL	Dimitri Lavalée (on loan to MVV)
7	FW	CRO	Duje Čop (on loan to Valladolid)
22	MF	BEL	Edmilson Junior (to Al-Duhail)
24	DF	GRE	Georgios Koutroumpis (end of contract)
—	MF	BEL	Beni Badibanga (was on loan to Lierse, now sold to Waasland-Beveren)
—	FW	ALG	Ishak Belfodil (was on loan to Werder Bremen, now sold to TSG 1899 Hoffenheim)
—	FW	COD	Jonathan Bolingi (was on loan to Excel Mouscron, now sold to Antwerp)
—	MF	FRA	Jean-Luc Dompé (was on loan to Amiens, now sold to Gent)
—	MF	TOG	Mathieu Dossevi (was on loan to Metz, now sold)
—	GK	BEL	Antoine Lejoly (to Beerschot Wilrijk)
—	MF	UGA	Farouk Miya (was on loan to Sabail, now sold to Gorica)
—	FW	BEL	Ryan Mmaee (was on loan to Waasland-Beveren, now loaned to AGF)
—	DF	BEL	Samy Mmaee (was on loan to MVV, now sold to Sint-Truiden)
—	MF	COD	Dieumerci Ndongala (was on loan to Genk, now sold)
—	FW	BEL	Benito Raman (first extended loan to Fortuna Düsseldorf, then sold)
—	MF	BEL	Marten Wilmots (to Avellino)

==== Waasland-Beveren ====
In:

No.	Pos.	Nation	Player
—	MF	COM	Rafidine Abdullah (from Cádiz)
—	MF	BEL	Beni Badibanga (from Standard Liège)
—	MF	RWA	Djihad Bizimana (from APR)
—	GK	BEL	Kevin Debaty (from Antwerp)
—	FW	ITA	Francesco Forte (from Inter Milan)
—	DF	CRC	Alexis Gamboa (from Santos de Guápiles)
—	MF	BEL	Daan Heymans (from Westerlo)
—	MF	BEL	Denzel Jubitana (from Mechelen)
—	MF	SEN	Paul Keita (from Mezőkövesd)
—	MF	CRO	Karlo Lulić (from Rudeš)
—	DF	NED	Milan Massop (from Excelsior)
—	FW	SEN	Lamine Ndao (from Quevilly-Rouen)
—	DF	BEL	Nicolas Orye (loan return from Heist)
—	GK	BEL	Davy Roef (again on loan from Anderlecht)
—	DF	DEN	Tobias Salquist (from Silkeborg)
—	FW	BEL	Din Sula (from OH Leuven)
—	GK	BEL	Anthony Swolfs (on loan from Gent)
—	DF	ENG	Oscar Threlkeld (from Plymouth Argyle)
—	DF	BEL	Senne Van Dooren (loan return from Berchem Sport)
—	FW	GRE	Apostolos Vellios (on loan from Nottingham Forest)
—	DF	SRB	Aleksandar Vukotić (from Krupa)

Out:

No.	Pos.	Nation	Player
2	DF	SWE	Erdin Demir (to Zulte Waregem)
5	DF	ANG	Jonathan Buatu Mananga (to Rio Ave)
6	MF	BEL	Joachim Van Damme (to Mechelen)
8	MF	BEL	François Marquet (to Oostende)
9	FW	BEL	Ryan Mmaee (loan return to Standard Liège)
16	FW	SEN	Cherif Ndiaye (released)
17	MF	CIV	Victorien Angban (loan return to Chelsea)
18	GK	BEL	Merveille Goblet (end of contract)
21	DF	LUX	Laurent Jans (to Metz)
24	MF	BEL	Jens Cools (to Pafos)
27	DF	BEL	Maxim Nys (to Dender EH)
32	MF	BEL	Olivier Myny (to OH Leuven)
80	DF	BEL	Niels Verburgh (loan return to Club Brugge)
92	FW	SWE	Isaac Kiese Thelin (loan return to Anderlecht)
93	MF	ALG	Rachid Aït-Atmane (loan return to Gijón)
—	FW	BEL	Alessandro Cerigioni (was on loan to Roeselare, now sold to Lommel)
—	FW	BEL	Aaron Dhondt (was on loan to Knokke, now sold)

==== Zulte Waregem ====
In:

No.	Pos.	Nation	Player
—	FW	CIV	Chris Bedia (on loan from Charleroi)
—	MF	NOR	Henrik Bjørdal (from Brighton & Hove Albion)
—	MF	BEL	Théo Bongonda (was on loan from Celta de Vigo, now bought)
—	MF	BEL	Thomas Buffel (from Genk)
—	DF	SUI	Marco Bürki (from Young Boys)
—	DF	SWE	Erdin Demir (from Waasland-Beveren)
—	MF	NED	Hicham Faik (from Excelsior)
—	MF	FIN	Urho Nissilä (from KuPS)
—	MF	FIN	Mikael Soisalo (from Middlesbrough)
—	FW	SEN	Mamadou Sylla Diallo (on loan from Gent)
—	MF	FRA	Florian Tardieu (from Sochaux-Montbéliard)
—	DF	BEL	Bryan Verboom (loan return from Kortrijk)

Out:

No.	Pos.	Nation	Player
6	DF	BEL	Timothy Derijck (to Gent)
7	FW	BEL	Aaron Leya Iseka (loan return to Anderlecht)
8	MF	BEL	Gertjan De Mets (on loan to Beerschot Wilrijk)
10	MF	BEL	Onur Kaya (to Mechelen)
19	MF	NOR	Fredrik Oldrup Jensen (on loan to Göteborg)
20	MF	CIV	Idrissa Doumbia (loan return to Anderlecht)
23	MF	BEL	Julien De Sart (loan return to Middlesbrough)
31	DF	DEN	Brian Hämäläinen (to Dynamo Dresden)
33	FW	SRB	Ivan Šaponjić (loan return to Benfica)
43	MF	BEL	Sander Coopman (loan return to Club Brugge)
99	FW	NGR	Peter Olayinka (loan return to Gent)
—	DF	NGR	Aliko Bala (was on loan to Hapoel Acre, now loaned to Hapoel Marmorek)
—	DF	BEL	Koni De Winter (to Juventus)
—	FW	NED	Robert Mühren (was on loan to Sparta Rotterdam, now loaned to NAC Breda)
—	MF	ISR	Ben Reichert (was on loan to Hapoel Acre, now loaned to Ashdod)

=== First Division B ===
==== Beerschot Wilrijk ====
In:

No.	Pos.	Nation	Player
—	DF	FRA	Pierre Bourdin (from Lierse)
—	FW	BEL	Loris Brogno (from Sparta Rotterdam)
—	MF	BEL	Gertjan De Mets (on loan from Zulte Waregem)
—	MF	FRA	Emeric Dudouit (from Tubize)
—	MF	BEL	Grégory Grisez (from Roeselare)
—	DF	TUR	Gökhan Kardeş (from PSV)
—	MF	BEL	Faysel Kasmi (from Waterford)
—	GK	BEL	Antoine Lejoly (from Standard Liège)
—	FW	COD	Kule Mbombo (again on loan from Vita Club)
—	FW	CMR	Marius Noubissi (from Ilves)
—	MF	MAR	Tarik Tissoudali (from Le Havre)
—	FW	BEL	Jorn Vancamp (from Anderlecht)
—	GK	BEL	Mike Vanhamel (from Oostende)
—	MF	BEL	Dante Vanzeir (on loan from Genk)
—	MF	BEL	Dani Wilms (from Mechelen)

Out:

No.	Pos.	Nation	Player
1	GK	VEN	Rafael Romo (loan return to APOEL)
4	DF	NED	Arjan Swinkels (to Mechelen)
8	MF	BRA	Octávio (released)
9	FW	MAR	Youssef Boulaouali (to Lierse Kempenzonen)
17	MF	ARG	Hernán Losada (retired)
20	MF	GHA	Collins Tanor (loan return to Manchester City)
21	DF	BEL	Guillaume François (to Virton)
22	FW	EST	Rauno Sappinen (loan return to Flora)
32	MF	BEL	Jaric Schaessens (to Rupel Boom)
35	MF	MAR	Karim Essikal (to Eindhoven)
43	MF	BEL	Charni Ekangamene (to Eindhoven)
44	DF	CIV	Abdel Diarra (released)
—	GK	BEL	Michaël Clepkens (was on loan to Lommel, now released to Knokke)
—	DF	BEL	Yan De Maeyer (was on loan to Oosterzonen Oosterwijk, now sold to Rupel Boom)
—	GK	BEL	Quintijn Steelant (to Dikkelvenne)
—	FW	CMR	Jacques Zoua (released)

==== Lommel ====
In:

No.	Pos.	Nation	Player
—	MF	BEL	Thomas Azevedo (was on loan from OH Leuven, now bought)
—	MF	BEL	Geert Berben (from OH Leuven)
—	MF	CGO	Romeni Scott Bitsindou (from Javor Matis)
—	FW	BEL	Alessandro Cerigioni (from Waasland-Beveren)
—	MF	BEL	Glenn Claes (from Mechelen)
—	GK	BEL	Gaëtan Coucke (on loan from Genk)
—	GK	BEL	Dieter Creemers (from Lokeren)
—	DF	BEL	Sebastiaan De Wilde (from Eindhoven)
—	DF	BEL	Soufiane El Banouhi (on loan from Union SG)
—	FW	POR	Leonardo Rocha (from Ontinyent)
—	DF	BEL	Ben Santermans (was on loan from Den Bosch, now bought)
—	DF	BEL	Wesley Vanbelle (on loan from Cercle Brugge)

Out:

No.	Pos.	Nation	Player
1	GK	BEL	Michaël Clepkens (loan return to Beerschot Wilrijk)
2	DF	NED	Jeffrey Ket (on loan to Quick Boys)
4	DF	BEL	Jordan Renson (to Patro Eisden Maasmechelen)
7	MF	BEL	Iebe Swers (loan return to Sint-Truiden)
9	FW	BEL	Simon Vermeiren (to Lierse Kempenzonen)
10	MF	BEL	Alexandre De Bruyn (to Sint-Truiden)
12	GK	BEL	Jarno De Smet (to Kortrijk)
18	MF	BEL	Wouter Scheelen (to Bocholt)
20	FW	BEL	Din Sula (loan return to OH Leuven)
21	MF	BEL	Yassin Gueroui (to Mouloudia Oujda)
22	DF	BEL	Gilles Ruyssen (to RWDM47)
26	MF	BEL	Giel Deferm (to Thes Sport)
28	MF	BEL	Jordi Maus (to Oosterzonen Oosterwijk)
—	DF	BEL	Axel Swerten (was on loan to Tienen, now sold to Patro Eisden Maasmechelen)
—	DF	BEL	Jonas Vinck (signed from Lierse, then contract annulled)

==== Mechelen ====
In:

No.	Pos.	Nation	Player
—	DF	CIV	Mamadou Bagayoko (was on loan from OH Leuven, now bought)
—	MF	FRA	Franck Berrier (from Oostende)
—	DF	NED	Lucas Bijker (from Cádiz)
—	GK	BEL	Bram Castro (from Heracles)
—	FW	BEL	Mathieu Cornet (from Roeselare)
—	DF	BEL	Alexander Corryn (loan return from Antwerp)
—	FW	BEL	Igor de Camargo (from APOEL)
—	FW	SWE	Gustav Engvall (from Bristol City)
—	MF	BEL	Onur Kaya (from Zulte Waregem)
—	DF	BEL	Laurent Lemoine (from Club Brugge)
—	MF	BIH	Milan Savić (from Red Star Belgrade)
—	FW	BEL	Nikola Storm (from Club Brugge)
—	DF	NED	Arjan Swinkels (from Beerschot Wilrijk)
—	FW	CIV	William Togui (from Gagnoa)
—	MF	BEL	Joachim Van Damme (from Waasland-Beveren)
—	GK	NED	Michael Verrips (from Sparta Rotterdam)

Out:

No.	Pos.	Nation	Player
2	DF	BEL	Laurens Paulussen (end of contract)
3	MF	MAR	Ahmed El Messaoudi (on loan to Fortuna Sittard)
5	DF	SRB	Uroš Vitas (contract terminated)
8	MF	CRC	Randall Leal (to Deportivo Saprissa)
9	FW	DEN	Nicklas Pedersen (to Emmen)
11	MF	BEL	Mats Rits (to Club Brugge)
16	MF	GRE	Dimitris Kolovos (on loan to Willem II)
19	FW	MNE	Fatos Bećiraj (released)
22	DF	BEL	Elias Cobbaut (to Anderlecht)
26	GK	BEL	Colin Coosemans (to Gent)
27	FW	BFA	Hassane Bandé (to Ajax)
28	MF	TUN	Fabien Camus (end of contract)
47	MF	BEL	Andy Kawaya (to Avellino)
49	GK	LUX	Anthony Moris (to Virton)
77	MF	BEL	Glenn Claes (to Lommel)
99	FW	FRA	Nicolas Verdier (loan return to Eupen)
—	MF	BEL	Denzel Jubitana (to Waasland-Beveren)
—	MF	BEL	Jonathan Kindermans (was on loan to Union SG, now sold to RWDM47)
—	MF	BEL	Miguel Mees (was on loan to Rupel Boom, now loaned to Duffel)
—	FW	BEL	Jordy Peffer (was on loan to Westerlo, now loaned to Dessel Sport)
—	DF	MAR	Faycal Rherras (was on loan to Hibernian, then released to Béziers)
—	MF	BEL	Dani Wilms (to Beerschot Wilrijk)

==== OH Leuven ====
In:

No.	Pos.	Nation	Player
—	FW	BEL	Benjamin Bambi (loan return from Heist)
—	DF	FRA	Frédéric Duplus (from Lens)
—	FW	NED	Sam Hendriks (from Go Ahead Eagles)
—	FW	ENG	George Hirst (from Sheffield Wednesday)
—	MF	POL	Bartosz Kapustka (on loan from Leicester City)
—	MF	FRA	Samy Kehli (was on loan from Lokeren, now bought)
—	MF	FRA	Redouane Kerrouche (from Paris)
—	DF	ENG	Elliott Moore (again on loan from Leicester City)
—	MF	BEL	Olivier Myny (from Waasland-Beveren)
—	MF	BEL	Leo Njengo (loan return from Dessel Sport)
—	MF	BEL	Ahmed Touba (on loan from Club Brugge)
—	MF	BEL	Jellert van Landschoot (on loan from Club Brugge)

Out:

No.	Pos.	Nation	Player
8	MF	FRA	Flavien Le Postollec (to Deinze)
11	FW	BEL	Nikola Storm (loan return to Club Brugge)
21	GK	BEL	Andreas Suederick (to Pepingen-Halle)
27	DF	BEL	Jordy Gillekens (on loan to Fiorentina)
31	DF	FRA	Benjamin Boulenger (loan return to Charleroi)
—	FW	BEL	Thomas Azevedo (was on loan to Lommel, now sold)
—	DF	CIV	Mamadou Bagayoko (was on loan to Mechelen, now sold)
—	MF	BEL	Geert Berben (was on loan to Oosterzonen Oosterwijk, now sold to Lommel)
—	MF	NED	Dico Jap Tjong (end of contract)
—	MF	BEL	Jordy Lokando (was on loan to Heist, now released to RWDM47)
—	MF	NGR	Godwin Odibo (end of contract)
—	FW	BEL	Din Sula (was on loan to Lommel, now sold to Waasland-Beveren)

==== Roeselare ====
In:

No.	Pos.	Nation	Player
—	MF	BEL	Mohammed Aoulad (from Wydad)
—	DF	BRA	Andrei Camargo (from Lierse)
—	MF	BEL	Stijn De Smet (from Kortrijk)
—	DF	NED	Danzell Gravenberch (again on loan from Reading)
—	DF	BEL	Fazlı Kocabaş (from Wallonia Walhain)
—	GK	BEL	Gilles Lentz (from Kortrijk)
—	MF	SLO	Nicolas Rajsel (on loan from Oostende)
—	MF	FRA	Willy Semedo (on loan from Charleroi)
—	DF	NED	Kenny van der Weg (from Hamilton Academical)
—	FW	CUW	Gino van Kessel (from Slavia Prague)
—	FW	BEL	Ben Yagan (from Dessel Sport)

Out:

No.	Pos.	Nation	Player
3	DF	SEN	Souleymane Aw (loan return to Eupen)
7	FW	BEL	Davy Brouwers (to Thes Sport)
8	MF	FRA	Mikael Seoudi (to Olympic Charleroi)
10	FW	BIH	Marko Maletić (on loan to Dordrecht)
15	DF	BEL	Pieter-Jan Monteyne (to Hamme)
16	DF	MAD	Zotsara Randriambololona (loan return to Antwerp)
17	MF	BEL	Grégory Grisez (to Beerschot Wilrijk)
21	FW	BEL	Alessandro Cerigioni (loan return to Waasland-Beveren)
24	FW	BEL	Mathieu Cornet (to Mechelen)
26	MF	FRA	Lilian Bochet (to Olympic Charleroi)
27	DF	BEL	Laurent Lemoine (loan return to Club Brugge)
30	MF	LIE	Sandro Wieser (loan return to Reading)
39	GK	BEL	Yves De Winter (to Antwerp)

==== Tubize ====
In:

No.	Pos.	Nation	Player
—	MF	GHA	Ernest Agyiri (on loan from Manchester City)
—	GK	BEL	Lucas Alfieri (from Club Brugge)
—	MF	RUS	Georgi Chelidze (from Dynamo Moscow)
—	FW	BFA	Banou Diawara (from FAR)
—	MF	SEN	Lemouya Goudiaby (from Metz)
—	MF	TUR	Murad Han Gönen (from Club Brugge)
—	FW	BRA	Pedro Henrique Bueno (on loan from Chamois Niortais)
—	FW	FRA	Thomas Henry (from Chambly)
—	DF	FRA	Anthony Lippini (from Tours)
—	DF	BEL	Gertjan Martens (from Union SG)
—	MF	GHA	Divine Naah (was on loan from Manchester City, now bought)
—	MF	FRA	Aaron Nemane (on loan from Manchester City)
—	MF	ISR	Tom Rosenthal (from Dordrecht)

Out:

No.	Pos.	Nation	Player
2	DF	BEL	Quentin Laurent (to Châtelet)
6	DF	FRA	Emeric Dudouit (to Beerschot Wilrijk)
8	MF	NED	Ewout Gouw (end of contract)
9	FW	FRA	Florent Stevance (loan return to Charleroi)
10	MF	CRO	Mario Babić (to Široki Brijeg)
12	MF	NGR	Simon Zenke (end of contract)
15	MF	BEL	Steve Ryckaert (loan return to Sint-Truiden)
17	DF	FRA	Maxence Carlier (loan return to Lens)
28	MF	AUS	Panos Armenakas (loan return to Udinese)
—	FW	MAR	Karim Achahbar (loan return to Guingamp)
—	FW	GAM	Ibou (released)
—	DF	SEN	Mohamed Kané (loan return to Metz)
—	MF	GEO	Levan Shengelia (released)

==== Union SG ====
In:

No.	Pos.	Nation	Player
—	MF	GER	Max Besuschkow (on loan from Eintracht Frankfurt)
—	MF	FRA	Nils Bouekou (from Créteil)
—	GK	BEL	Enzo D'Alberto (from Anderlecht)
—	DF	ESP	Carlos David Moreno (from Huesca)
—	MF	FRA	Abdelrafik Gérard (from Lens)
—	FW	ESP	Urtzi Iriondo (from Athletic Bilbao B)
—	GK	NOR	Anders Kristiansen (from Sarpsborg 08)
—	MF	GER	Marcel Mehlem (from Karlsruher SC)
—	FW	FRA	Youssouf Niakaté (from Boulogne)
—	MF	POR	Steven Pinto-Borges (from Grenoble)
—	MF	COM	Faïz Selemani (from Lorient)
—	FW	RSA	Percy Tau (on loan from Brighton & Hove Albion)
—	MF	FRA	Hadamou Traore (from Drancy)
—	DF	ARG	Federico Vega (from Lorca)

Out:

No.	Pos.	Nation	Player
1	GK	COD	Mulopo Kudimbana (end of contract)
5	DF	BEL	Grégoire Neels (end of contract)
7	FW	MLI	Mamadou Diallo (end of contract)
10	FW	BEL	Augusto Da Silva (to Lierse Kempenzonen)
14	DF	BEL	Axel Leers (to Virton)
19	MF	BEL	Kenneth Houdret (to Avellino)
20	FW	COD	Héritier Luvumbu (to FAR Rabat)
21	DF	BEL	Gertjan Martens (to Tubize)
23	DF	CGO	Jordan Massengo (end of contract)
27	MF	BEL	Jonathan Kindermans (loan return to Mechelen)
28	DF	BEL	Soufiane El Banouhi (on loan to Lommel)
77	FW	BEL	Christophe Bertjens (to Bocholt)
94	FW	BEL	Nathan Kabasele (loan return to Gazişehir Gaziantep)
—	FW	GUI	Yady Bangoura (was on loan to Eendracht Aalst, now sold to RFC Liège)
—	GK	BEL	Adriano Cipollina (end of contract)
—	FW	COD	Freddy Mombongo-Dues (was on loan to RFC Liège, then released to Patro Eisden Maasmechelen)
—	MF	MAR	Yassine Salah (was on loan to Sint-Truiden, now sold to Olympic Charleroi)

==== Westerlo ====
In:

No.	Pos.	Nation	Player
—	FW		Kurt Abrahams (from Sint-Truiden)
—	DF		Fabien Antunes (on loan from Sint-Truiden)
—	DF		Simon Bammens (from Olympia Wijgmaal)
—	FW		Stephen Buyl (was on loan from Cercle Brugge, now bought)
—	MF		Guillaume De Schryver (from Cercle Brugge)
—	FW		Ambroise Gboho (from Les Herbiers)
—	MF		Nader Ghandri (on loan from Antwerp)
—	DF		Christophe Janssens (from Genk)
—	DF		Randal Oto'o (was on loan from Braga, now bought)
—	FW		Sava Petrov (from Spartak Subotica)
—	DF		Noël Soumah (was on loan from Gent, now bought)
—	MF		Lukas Van Eenoo (was on loan from Kortrijk, now bought)

Out:

No.	Pos.	Nation	Player
5	DF		Michiel Jaeken (on loan to Dessel Sport)
9	FW		Christian Osaguona (to Umm Salal)
10	FW		Benjamin De Ceulaer (to Eendracht Termien)
17	MF		Bernardinho (on loan to ASV Geel)
18	MF		Daan Heymans (to Waasland-Beveren)
19	MF		Daniel Christensen (to Vendsyssel)
23	MF		Jeroen Goor (on loan to Olympia Wijgmaal)
27	FW		Jordy Peffer (loan return to Mechelen)
44	DF		Konstantinos Rougalas (to Doxa Dramas)
