= Toualy =

Toualy is an Ivorian surname. Notable people with this surname include:

- Jean Marco Toualy (born 1999), Ivorian footballer
- Likane Julie Toualy (born 1976), Ivorian handball player
- Sery Toualy (born 1986), Ivorian handball player
