= Damien Mouchamps =

Belgian footballer

Personal information
- Date of birth: 10 January 1996 (age 30)
- Place of birth: Verviers, Belgium
- Height: 1.72 m (5 ft 7 1/2 in)
- Position: Forward

Team information
- Current team: RFC Liège
- Number: 13

Youth career
- Etoile Elsautoise
- 2015: Eupen

Senior career*
Years	Team	Apps	(Gls)
2015–2018	Eupen	2	(0)
2018–	RFC Liège	190	(22)
- * Club domestic league appearances and goals as of 19 April 2026

Damien Mouchamps (born 10 January 1996) is a Belgian footballer who plays for RFC Liège in the Challenger Pro League as a forward.

== Professional career ==
Mouchamps made his debut for Eupen in a 4–0 victory over Geel on 11 April 2015. He made his professional debut in a 4–0 loss to R.S.C. Anderlecht on 18 December 2016.
