= Niels Verburgh =

Belgian footballer

Personal information
- Date of birth: 31 January 1998 (age 28)
- Place of birth: Bruges, Belgium
- Position: Centre back

Team information
- Current team: Sporting Hasselt
- Number: 6

Senior career*
| Years | Team | Apps | (Gls) |
| 2016–2018 | Club Brugge | 0 | (0) |
| 2018 | → Waasland-Beveren (loan) | 9 | (0) |
| 2018–2020 | Roda JC Kerkrade | 47 | (2) |
| 2020 | Roeselare | | |
| 2020–2021 | Knokke | | |
| 2021–2022 | Jeunesse Esch | 26 | (1) |
| 2022–2024 | Patro Eisden | 27 | (3) |
| 2023–2024 | → Sporting Hasselt (loan) | 18 | (4) |
| 2024– | Sporting Hasselt | 46 | (6) |

International career^{‡}
| 2014–2015 | Belgium U17 | 8 | (0) |
| 2016 | Belgium U18 | 1 | (0) |
| 2016 | Belgium U19 | 5 | (0) |
- * Club domestic league appearances and goals as of 2 May 2026 ‡ National team caps and goals as of 09:04, 25 October 2018 (UTC)

Niels Verburgh (born 31 January 1998) is a Belgian professional footballer who plays for Sporting Hasselt. He represented Belgium at youth international level.

== Club career ==
On 23 June 2021, he joined Jeunesse Esch in Luxembourg.

On 31 August 2023, Verburgh joined Sporting Hasselt on loan. The transfer was made permanent on 1 February 2024.
