= Quentin Laurent =

Belgian footballer (born 1989)

Personal information
- Date of birth: 6 October 1989 (age 37)
- Place of birth: Belgium
- Height: 1.86 m (6 ft 1 in)
- Position: Centre-back

Team information
- Current team: RCS Brainois

Senior career*
Years	Team	Apps	(Gls)
–2012	Léopold		
2012–2013	KSC Grimbergen	26	(0)
2013–2018	Tubize	89	(2)
2018–2019	Châtelet	26	(0)
2019–2021	Olympic Charleroi	22	(0)
2021–2022	Rebecq	24	(0)
2022–	RCS Brainois		
- * Club domestic league appearances and goals

Quentin Laurent (born 6 October 1989) is a Belgian professional footballer who plays as a centre-back for Belgian Division 3 club RCS Brainois.

== Career ==
On 16 March 2021, Laurent signed with Rebecq in the Belgian Division 2. He moved there from Olympic Charleroi, where he had played between 2019 and 2021. Earlier, he had represented Châtelet, Tubize, and KSC Grimbergen.

Laurent made his debut for Rebecq on 28 August 2021 in a 1–0 league win over Stockay-Warfusée.

In April 2022, Laurent joined Belgian Division 3 club RCS Brainois.
