= Aleksa Damjanac =

Serbian footballer

Personal information
- Date of birth: 20 October 1998 (age 28)
- Place of birth: Serbia
- Height: 1.85 m (6 ft 1 in)
- Position: Defender

Youth career
- 2015: Partizan
- 2015–2016: OFK Beograd
- 2017: Mallorca

Senior career*
Years	Team	Apps	(Gls)
2016–2017	OFK Beograd	4	(0)
2017–2018	Mallorca B	0	(0)
2018–2019	Mouscron	0	(0)
2019–2020	Partizan	0	(0)
2019–2020	→ Teleoptik (loan)	2	(0)
2020–2021	Grafičar Beograd	18	(0)
2021–2022	Radnički Kragujevac	24	(1)
- * Club domestic league appearances and goals as of 1 October 2022

Aleksa Damjanac (born 20 October 1998) is a Serbian footballer who plays as a centre-back.

== Career ==
For the second half of 2016–17, Damjanac signed for RCD Mallorca in the Spanish second division, failing to make an appearance but winning the Spanish fourth division with their reserves, which he considers the highlight of his career.

After failing to make an appearance for Belgian side Mouscron as well as Partizan, Damjanac signed for Grafičar Beograd in the Serbian second division.

He is the son of former player Nikola.
