= Sebastiaan De Wilde =

Belgian footballer

Personal information
- Full name: Sebastiaan De Wilde
- Date of birth: 2 February 1993 (age 33)
- Place of birth: Wetteren, Belgium
- Height: 1.86 m (6 ft 1 in)
- Position: Centre back

Team information
- Current team: Knokke
- Number: 22

Youth career
- Eendracht Laarne
- Lokeren
- Anderlecht

Senior career*
Years	Team	Apps	(Gls)
2013–2018	FC Eindhoven	80	(2)
2018–2019	Lommel	22	(0)
2019–	Knokke	31	(1)
- * Club domestic league appearances and goals as of 21:14, 19 December 2021 (UTC)

Sebastiaan De Wilde (born 2 February 1993) is a Belgian professional footballer who plays as a centre back for Knokke.

== Career ==
De Wilde played youth football for Eendracht Laarne, Lokeren and Anderlecht. In the summer of 2013, he decided to leave Anderlecht to sign a contract with FC Eindhoven. He made his debut on 25 October 2013 in a 3–1 home loss to Excelsior, coming on as a substitute in the second half for Jasper Waalkens. His first goals followed in the 2016–17 season, his first being a first-half goal on 30 October 2016 against Cambuur. In March 2017, his expiring contract was extended by one year.

In May 2018, De Wilde moved to Lommel on a free transfer, signing a two-year contract. In May 2019, De Wilde and Lommel decided to terminate the agreement by mutual consent.

Ahead of the 2019–20 season, De Wilde joined Knokke on a three-year contract.
