= Jesús Marimón =

Colombian footballer (born 1998)

Personal information
- Full name: Jesús David Marimón Báez
- Date of birth: 9 September 1998 (age 28)
- Place of birth: María La Baja, Colombia
- Height: 1.82 m (6 ft 0 in)
- Position: Midfielder

Team information
- Current team: Deportes Quindío
- Number: 26

Youth career
- Valledupar
- Palmazul

Senior career*
Years	Team	Apps	(Gls)
2015–2018	Once Caldas	34	(1)
2018–2019	Royal Excel Mouscron	0	(0)
2019–2022	Patriotas Boyacá	2	(0)
2023–	Deportes Quindío		

International career
2015	Colombia U17	6	(0)
- * Club domestic league appearances and goals as of 00:05, 7 November 2019 (UTC)

Jesús David Marimón Báez (9 September 1998) is a footballer from Colombia who plays as a defensive midfielder who plays for Colombian side Deportes Quindío.

== Club career ==
Marimón made his league debut at 17 August 2015 against Jaguares de Córdoba.
