= Hadamou Traoré =

French footballer (born 1993)

Personal information
- Date of birth: 7 September 1993 (age 33)
- Place of birth: Paris, France
- Height: 1.87 m (6 ft 2 in)
- Position: Midfielder

Youth career
- 2008–2011: Nantes
- 2011–2012: Paris FC

Senior career*
| Years | Team | Apps | (Gls) |
| 2014–2015 | Le Pontet | 10 | (0) |
| 2015–2017 | Monts d'Or Azergues | 53 | (3) |
| 2017–2018 | Drancy | 19 | (0) |
| 2018–2020 | Union SG | 4 | (0) |
- * Club domestic league appearances and goals as of 29 October 2020

Hadamou Traoré (born 7 September 1993) is a French professional footballer who plays as a midfielder for Belgian club Union SG.

== Club career ==
Traoré began playing football in his hometown of Paris, eventually joining the Nantes academy in 2008, where he played up to the under-19 level. After failing to get a pro contract from the team, he made the switch to Paris FC in 2011, where he played one more year in the under-19 league.

After a two-year break from football, he joined Le Pontet in the fourth-tier Championnat de France Amateur for the 2014–15 season. Midway through the year, he made the move to Monts d'Or Azergues. He signed with Drancy of the newly-named Championnat National 2 in the summer of 2017.

In June 2018, Traoré was signed by Belgian First Division B side Union SG on a two-year deal. He made his professional debut a few months later, coming on for Charles Morren during an away win against OH Leuven on 16 November.

== Personal life ==
Born in France, Traoré is of Mauritanian descent. His older brother, Bouna, died from electrocution in 2005 at a building site in the Clichy-sous-Bois suburbs of Paris while hiding from police, an event that unleashed weeks of violent protests across the country addressing the issue of police harassment in poorer immigrant communities.
