= Laurent Lemoine =

Belgian footballer (born 1998)

Personal information
- Full name: Laurent Lemoine
- Date of birth: 24 April 1998 (age 28)
- Place of birth: La Louvière, Belgium
- Height: 1.86 m (6 ft 1 in)
- Position: Centre back

Team information
- Current team: Zulte Waregem
- Number: 4

Youth career
- Mons
- Club Brugge

Senior career*
Years	Team	Apps	(Gls)
2016–2018	Club Brugge	0	(0)
2017–2018	→ Roeselare (loan)	15	(0)
2018–2020	KV Mechelen	11	(0)
2020–2023	Lommel	61	(2)
2023–2024	Deinze	11	(2)
2024–	Zulte Waregem	39	(1)

International career
2013	Belgium U15	3	(0)
2013–2014	Belgium U16	7	(0)
2015	Belgium U17	9	(0)
2016–2017	Belgium U19	7	(0)
- * Club domestic league appearances and goals as of 11 May 2026

Laurent Lemoine (born 24 April 1998) is a Belgian footballer who plays as a defender for Zulte Waregem in the Belgian Pro League.

== Club career ==
On 31 May 2023, Lemoine signed a three-year contract with Deinze.

On 5 September 2024, Lemoine joined S.V. Zulte Waregem on a three-year contract.

== Personal life ==
Born in Belgium, Lemoine is of Brazilian descent.
