= Lamine Ndao =

Senegalese footballer

Personal information
- Full name: Mouhamadou Lamine Ndao
- Date of birth: 19 December 1994 (age 31)
- Place of birth: Dakar, Senegal
- Height: 1.78 m (5 ft 10 in)
- Position: Forward

Senior career*
Years	Team	Apps	(Gls)
2014–2018	Valenciennes B	17	(9)
2014–2018	Valenciennes	67	(5)
2018	Quevilly-Rouen	12	(7)
2018	Waasland-Beveren	7	(0)
2019	Gazélec Ajaccio	13	(1)
2019–2020	Quevilly-Rouen	11	(1)
2020–2021	Concarneau	17	(4)
2022	Le Puy	7	(1)
- * Club domestic league appearances and goals as of 14:41, 5 June 2022 (UTC)

Lamine Ndao (born 19 December 1994) is a Senegalese professional footballer who plays as a forward.

== Career ==
Following lack of playing time at Valenciennes, Ndao was linked with Ligue 2 sides Auxerre and Orléans in early January 2018. Later that month, however, Ndao joined Quevilly-Rouen on a contract until the end of the season, with the option of an extension.

In January 2019, after half a season in Belgium with Waasland-Beveren, Ndao signed a two-and-a-half-year contract with Gazélec Ajaccio in Ligue 2.

Dao re-signed for Quevilly-Rouen in August 2019. In August 2020 he moved to Concarneau.

== Honours ==
Le Puy

- Championnat National 2: 2021–22
