= Odeni George =

Nigerian footballer

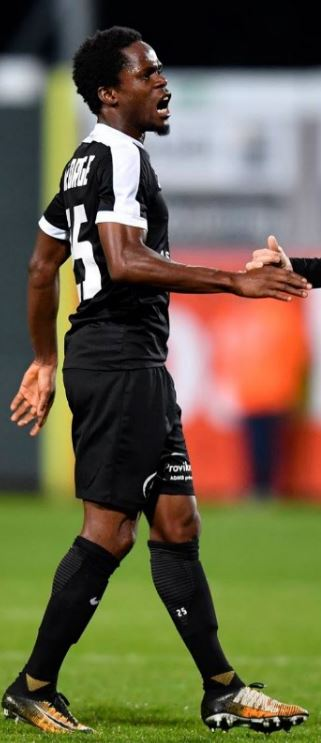

Personal information
- Full name: Odeni Igor George Jamabo
- Date of birth: 18 May 1995 (age 31)
- Place of birth: Port Harcourt, Rivers State, Nigeria
- Height: 1.71 m (5 ft 7 1/2 in)
- Position: Defensive midfielder

Team information
- Current team: Al-Hurriya SC
- Number: 20

Youth career
- 2012–2013: Aspire

Senior career*
Years	Team	Apps	(Gls)
2013–2018	Eupen	57	(0)
2018–2019	Hapoel Ramat Gan	35	(0)
2020–2021	Burgan SC		
2021–2022	Al-Jahra SC		
2022–2023	Al-Qaisumah		
2024–2026	Al-Qasim		
- * Club domestic league appearances and goals

Odeni Igor George Jamabo (born 18 May 1995) is a Nigerian professional footballer who plays as a defender.
