= Steven Pinto-Borges =

Association football player (born 1986)

Personal information
- Date of birth: 26 March 1986 (age 40)
- Place of birth: Vitry-sur-Seine, France
- Height: 1.82 m (6 ft 0 in)
- Position: Attacking midfielder

Youth career
- US Villejuif
- –2004: Créteil
- 2004–2005: Guingamp

Senior career*
Years	Team	Apps	(Gls)
2005–2009	Guingamp	59	(1)
2009–2011	Clermont	33	(0)
2011–2013	Cherbourg	33	(4)
2013–2014	Carquefou	27	(2)
2014–2018	Grenoble	105	(7)
2018–2019	Union SG	19	(0)
2019–2022	Annecy	48	(0)

International career
2007	Portugal U20	3	(0)
- * Club domestic league appearances and goals

Steven Pinto-Borges (born 26 March 1986) is a former professional footballer who played as an attacking midfielder. Born in France, he is a former youth international for Portugal.

== Club career ==
Born in Vitry-sur-Seine, Pinto-Borges played at youth level with US Villejuif and Créteil before joining the training centre at Guingamp. He signed professional terms with the club, and made his debut in the Ligue 2 game against Amiens on 11 November 2005. His first senior goal came on the last day of the 2007–08 Ligue 2 season, in the clubs 5–0 win against Troyes.

At the end of this Guingamp contract in the summer of 2009, Pinto-Borges signed for Clermont. He spent two seasons at the club, followed by two seasons in the Championnat National with Cherbourg and a season with Carquefou. In the summer of 2014 he signed for Grenoble in the fourth tier. During four seasons with the club they obtained back-to-back promotions to Ligue 2, but he left in the summer of 2018 without playing at the higher level again.

In June 2018 Pinto-Borges signed a one-year contract, with option to extend, with Belgian First Division B side Union Saint-Gilloise. He left in the summer 2019, after one season, returning to France with Annecy.

== International career ==
Pinto-Borges was born in France and holds Portuguese nationality. He represented the Portugal U20s at the 2007 Toulon Tournament.
