= Pedro Henrique (footballer, born 1993) =

Brazilian professional footballer

Personal information
- Full name: Pedro Henrique Bueno
- Date of birth: 14 June 1993 (age 33)
- Place of birth: Bariri, São Paulo, Brazil
- Height: 1.84 m (6 ft 0 in)
- Positions: Forward; left winger

Senior career*
Years	Team	Apps	(Gls)
2014–2015	Bragantino	2	(0)
2015–2016	Fréjus Saint-Raphaël	12	(1)
2016–2017	Béziers	25	(8)
2017–2020	Chamois Niortais	5	(0)
2018–2019	→ Tubize (loan)	20	(3)
Total		71	(12)
- * Club domestic league appearances and goals as of 23:11, 23 June 2024 (UTC)

Pedro Henrique Bueno (born 14 June 1993) is a former Brazilian professional footballer.

== Career ==
=== Bragantino ===
Henrique started his career in his native Brazil with Bragantino, playing two matches in Série B, as well as several in the regional state championships. He made his league debut against Boa on 26 July 2014. Henrique scored his first goal for the club in the Copa do Brasil, scoring against Lajeadense on 18 March 2015.

=== Fréjus Saint-Raphaël ===
Henrique moved to France in 2015, signing for Championnat National club Fréjus Saint-Raphaël. He made his league debut against Athlético Marseille on 14 August 2015. Henrique scored his first league goal against Les Herbiers on 30 October 2015, scoring in the 36th minute. He went on to make 12 league appearances, scoring once.

=== Béziers ===
Henrique spent the 2016–17 season with Béziers. He scored on his league debut against Belfort on 5 August 2016, scoring in the 17th minute.

=== Chamois Niortais ===
Henrique joined Ligue 2 side Chamois Niortais in the summer of 2017. He made his debut in the 0–0 draw with AC Ajaccio on 28 July 2017, coming on as a late substitute for Antoine Leautey.

He also played for Niort's reserve side, making his league debut against Les GenÊts D'Anglet on 25 November 2017. Henrique scored his first goal for the club against Mérignac-Arlac on 20 January 2018, scoring in the 56th minute.

=== Tubize ===
Henrique scored on his league debut against Beerschot on 5 August 2018, scoring in the 90th+1st minute.

=== Retirement ===
He officially announced his retirement in August 2020, while he had not played since March because of recurring injuries. He now wishes resume his studies in Lyon to become an osteopath.

== Personal life ==
He is of Catholic faith.
