= Ben Santermans =

Belgian footballer

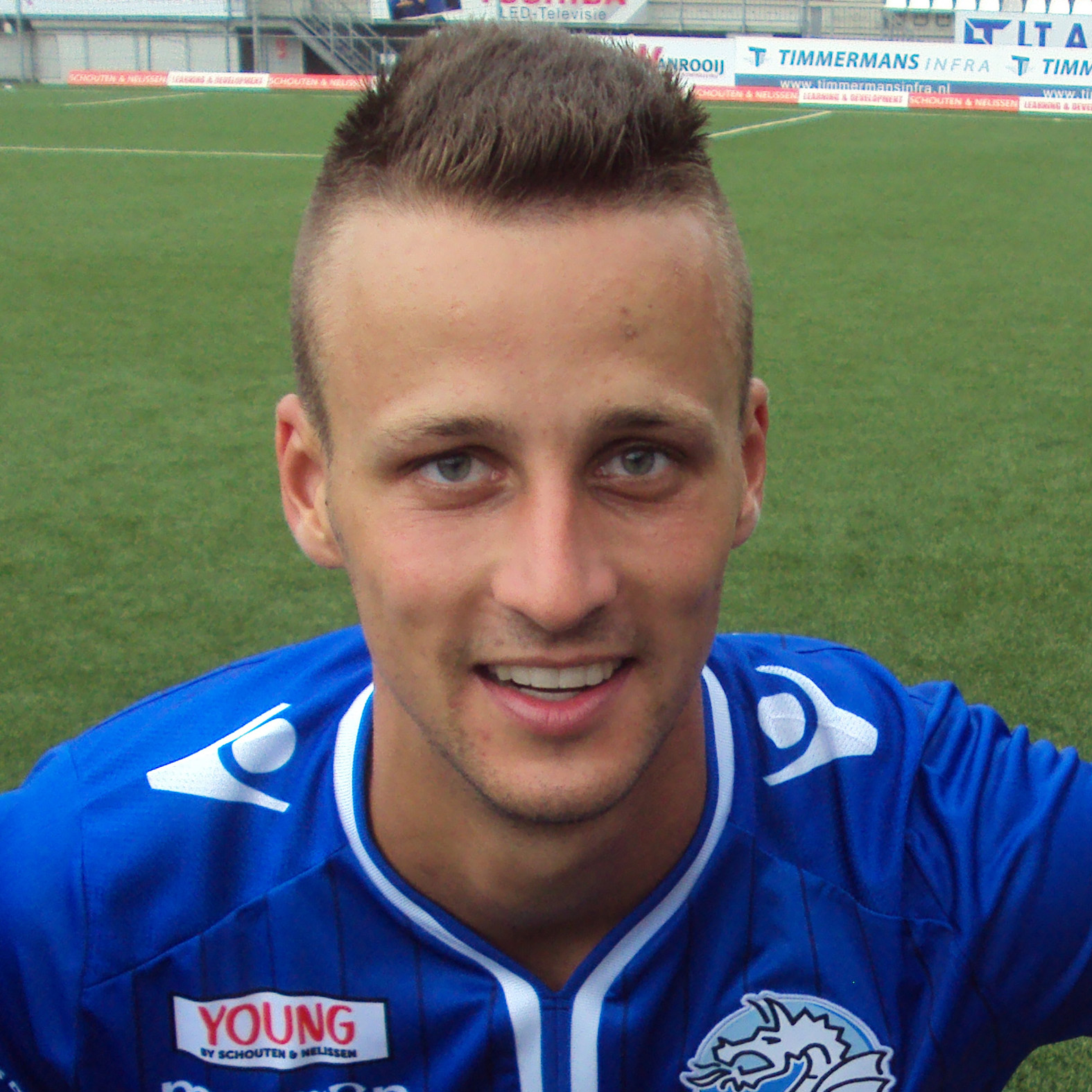
- Santermans in 2016

Personal information
- Full name: Ben Mario Gaston Santermans
- Date of birth: 26 June 1992 (age 34)
- Place of birth: Hasselt, Belgium
- Height: 1.85 m (6 ft 1 in)
- Position: Centre-back

Team information
- Current team: Wezel Sport
- Number: 4

Youth career
- Genk
- Excelsior Veldwezelt

Senior career*
Years	Team	Apps	(Gls)
2012–2013	Bocholt VV	31	(3)
2013–2015	ASV Geel	65	(4)
2015–2016	Beerschot Wilrijk	33	(2)
2016–2018	Den Bosch	39	(3)
2018	→ Lommel (loan)	11	(0)
2018–2020	Lommel	32	(1)
2020	→ Lierse (loan)	8	(0)
2020–2021	Lierse	23	(0)
2021–2022	Diest		
2022–2025	Houtvenne	66	(1)
2025–	Wezel Sport	0	(0)
- * Club domestic league appearances and goals as of 16 January 2026

Ben Mario Gaston Santermans (born 26 June 1992) is a Belgian footballer who plays as a centre-back for Wezel Sport.

== Career ==
=== Club career ===
In January 2020, Santermans was loaned out from Lommel SK to Lierse Kempenzonen until the end of the season. However, Lierse confirmed on 15 April 2020, that Santermans would join the club permanently from the next season, signing a one-year deal with an option for one further year.

For the 2021–22 season, he joined fifth-tier club Diest.
