= Wesley Vanbelle =

Belgian footballer

Personal information
- Date of birth: 5 August 1986 (age 40)
- Place of birth: Bonheiden, Belgium
- Height: 1.77 m (5 ft 10 in)
- Position: Left-back

Team information
- Current team: Sporting Kampenhout
- Number: 15

Youth career
- KV Mechelen

Senior career*
Years	Team	Apps	(Gls)
2005–2008	KV Mechelen	56	(1)
2008–2010	Beveren	35	(4)
2010	KSV Bornem	1	(0)
2010–2013	FC Eindhoven	77	(2)
2013–2015	Eendracht Aalst	59	(15)
2015–2018	Cercle Brugge	58	(2)
2018–2019	Lommel	5	(10)
2019–2020	KSV Roeselare	15	(1)
2020–2023	Dender EH	22	(0)
2023–	Sporting Kampenhout		
- * Club domestic league appearances and goals as of 09:52, 10 September 2023 (UTC)

Wesley Vanbelle (born 5 August 1986) is a Belgian professional footballer who plays for Sporting Kampenhout as a left-back.

== Career ==
Born in Bonheiden, Vanbelle has played for K.V. Mechelen, Beveren, Bornem, FC Eindhoven, Eendracht Aalst, Cercle Brugge, Lommel, KSV Roeselare and Dender.

For the 2023–24 season, Vanbelle joined an amateur side Sporting Kampenhout that plays in the sixth-tier Provincial League 1.
