= Kevin Debaty =

Belgian footballer

Personal information
- Date of birth: 12 June 1989 (age 37)
- Place of birth: Liège, Belgium
- Height: 1.87 m (6 ft 1 1/2 in)
- Position: Goalkeeper

Team information
- Current team: RSC Tilffois
- Number: 89

Youth career
- 1993–2000: Standard Liège
- 2000–2001: Toulouse
- 2001–2006: Montpellier

Senior career*
Years	Team	Apps	(Gls)
2006–2010	Eupen	48	(0)
2010–2011	Tubize	32	(0)
2011	Verviers	16	(0)
2012	RFCB Sprimont	15	(0)
2012–2015	PE Maasmechelen	119	(0)
2015–2018	Royal Antwerp	29	(0)
2018–2019	Waasland-Beveren	15	(0)
2019–2025	Liège	134	(0)
2025–	RSC Tilffois	22	(0)
- * Club domestic league appearances and goals as of 14 December 2025

Kevin Debaty (born 12 June 1989) is a Belgian professional footballer who plays as a goalkeeper for Belgian Division 2 club RSC Tilffois.
