= Robin Mantel =

Belgian footballer (born 2000)

Personal information
- Full name: Robin Mantel
- Date of birth: 15 November 2000 (age 25)
- Place of birth: Brasschaat, Belgium
- Height: 1.98 m (6 ft 6 in)
- Position: Goalkeeper

Team information
- Current team: SSV Ulm
- Number: 30

Youth career
- –2015: KV Turnhout
- 2015–2017: AS Verbroedering Geel

Senior career*
Years	Team	Apps	(Gls)
2017–2018	ASV Geel	15	(0)
2018–2020	KSC Lokeren	0	(0)
2020–2024	Helmond Sport	3	(0)
2024–2026	Heracles Almelo	0	(0)
2026–	SSV Ulm	2	(0)

International career^{‡}
2018	Belgium U19	2	(0)
- * Club domestic league appearances and goals as of 24 September 2026 ‡ National team caps and goals as of 7 March 2025

Robin Mantel (born 15 November 2000) is a Belgian professional footballer who plays as a goalkeeper for club SSV Ulm.

== Career ==
Mantel played in the youth academies of KV Turnhout and AS Verbroedering Geel. During the 2017–18 season, he made fifteen appearances for Geel in the Belgian First Amateur Division. After the season, he joined KSC Lokeren, where he served as a reserve goalkeeper and did not make a first-team appearance.

After the club went bankrupt in 2020, Mantel maintained his fitness with THES Sport before joining Helmond Sport on an amateur basis. He made his professional debut for Helmond Sport on 7 May 2021 in a 1–1 home draw against TOP Oss. Mantel eventually made three appearances for the club. On 10 November 2023, he came on as a substitute after an injury to Wouter van der Steen, and on 16 February 2024 he started and completed a match against De Graafschap.

In June 2024, Mantel joined Heracles Almelo in the Eredivisie. He serves as third-choice goalkeeper behind Fabian de Keijzer and Timo Jansink.

== Career statistics ==
Appearances and goals by club, season and competition
Club	Season	League			Cup		Total	
Club	Season	Division	Apps	Goals	Apps	Goals	Apps	Goals
AS Verbroedering Geel	2017–18	First Amateur Division	15	0	0	0	15	0
KSC Lokeren	2018–19	Belgian First Division A	0	0	0	0	0	0
KSC Lokeren	2019–20	Belgian First Division B	0	0	0	0	0	0
Helmond Sport	2020–21	Eerste Divisie	1	0	0	0	1	0
Helmond Sport	2021–22	Eerste Divisie	0	0	0	0	0	0
Helmond Sport	2022–23	Eerste Divisie	0	0	0	0	0	0
Helmond Sport	2023–24	Eerste Divisie	2	0	0	0	2	0
Heracles Almelo	2024–25	Eredivisie	0	0	0	0	0	0
Career total			18	0	0	0	18	0
