= Giel Deferm =

Belgian footballer

Personal information
- Full name: Giel Deferm
- Date of birth: 30 June 1988 (age 38)
- Place of birth: Sint-Truiden, Belgium
- Height: 1.79 m (5 ft 10 in)
- Position: Left back

Team information
- Current team: Thes Sport
- Number: 26

Youth career
- 1995–1997: VK Zepperen
- 1997–2006: Sint-Truiden

Senior career*
| Years | Team | Apps | (Gls) |
| 2006–2014 | Sint-Truiden | 138 | (2) |
| 2013 | → Beerschot (loan) | 10 | (0) |
| 2014–2018 | Lommel United | 44 | (0) |
| 2018– | Thes Sport | 57 | (5) |
- * Club domestic league appearances and goals as of 25 November 2020 ‡ National team caps and goals as of getrouwd Elke Erlich

Giel Deferm (born 30 June 1988) is a Belgian footballer who plays as a left back, who plays for Thes Sport in the Belgian First Amateur Division.
