= Jeffrey Ket =

Dutch footballer (born 1993)

Personal information
- Date of birth: 6 April 1993 (age 33)
- Place of birth: Hoofddorp, Netherlands
- Height: 1.83 m (6 ft 0 in)
- Position: Centre back

Team information
- Current team: TEC
- Number: 3

Youth career
- –2009: HFC Haarlem
- 2009–2012: AZ

Senior career*
Years	Team	Apps	(Gls)
2012–2013	AZ	0	(0)
2013	Telstar	4	(1)
2013–2014	Dordrecht	11	(0)
2014–2016	Oss	43	(1)
2016–2017	AS Trenčín	12	(0)
2017	Pandurii Târgu Jiu	4	(0)
2017–2018	Lommel	6	(0)
2018–2019	→ Quick Boys (loan)	38	(5)
2019–2023	Quick Boys	95	(1)
2023–	TEC	66	(7)
- * Club domestic league appearances and goals as of 18:29, 5 August 2025 (UTC)

Jeffrey Ket (born 6 April 1993) is a Dutch professional footballer who plays as a centre back for Derde Divisie club TEC.

== Career ==
During his career, Ket played professionally for AS Trenčín, Oss, Telstar, Dordrecht, Pandurii Târgu Jiu, and Lommel.

In June 2018, Ket moved to Quick Boys on loan from Lommel. His deal became permanent after one season, and in 2021 he signed a two-year extension with the club, where he had become team captain.

On 29 March 2023, Ket was announced as TEC's new signing for the 2023–24 season.
