= Maxim Nys =

Belgian footballer

Personal information
- Date of birth: 28 October 1996 (age 30)
- Place of birth: Belgium
- Height: 1.80 m (5 ft 11 in)
- Position: Left-back

Team information
- Current team: Lyra-Lierse
- Number: 5

Youth career
- Waasland-Beveren

Senior career*
Years	Team	Apps	(Gls)
2016–2018	Waasland-Beveren	6	(0)
2018–2020	Dender EH	48	(0)
2020–2025	Heist	95	(3)
2025–	Lyra-Lierse	8	(0)
- * Club domestic league appearances and goals as of 3 May 2026

Maxim Nys (born 28 October 1996) is a Belgian professional footballer who plays as a left back for Lyra-Lierse.
