= Michaël Clepkens =

Belgian footballer

Personal information
- Full name: Michaël Clepkens
- Date of birth: 30 January 1986 (age 40)
- Place of birth: Belgium
- Height: 1.86 m (6 ft 1 in)
- Position: Goalkeeper

Team information
- Current team: Knokke

Senior career*
Years	Team	Apps	(Gls)
–2008	Diegem		
2008–2010	Racing Mechelen		
2010–2013	Waasland-Beveren	39	(1)
2013–2014	Kortrijk	6	(0)
2014–2016	F91 Dudelange		
2016–2018	Beerschot Wilrijk		
2017–2018	→ Lommel (loan)		
2018–	Knokke		
- * Club domestic league appearances and goals as of 20 October 2016 (UTC)

Michaël Clepkens (born 30 January 1986) is a Belgian professional football goalkeeper currently playing for Knokke.

Clepkens started his professional career with Diegem and Racing Mechelen in the Belgian Third Division, before signing with Belgian Second Division team Waasland-Beveren in 2010. After gaining promotion, he was signed by Kortrijk in the fall of 2013 as a replacement goalkeeper.

== Famous moments ==
In Belgium, Clepkens is most known for two special feats, first he guided Racing Mechelen to the quarter finals of the 2008–09 Belgian Cup, after holding Zulte Waregem to a 0–0 draw during regular time, before making two saves during the penalty shootout and scoring the winning penalty kick himself. His second remarkable feat is scoring a last-minute header against Mons during the Belgian Second Division final rounds 2011–20#2011, denying the opponents their promotion to the Belgian Pro League.
