= Jean Marco Toualy =

Ivorian footballer

Personal information
- Full name: Jean Marco Toualy Dié
- Date of birth: 26 February 1999 (age 27)
- Height: 1.71 m (5 ft 7 in)
- Position: Winger

Team information
- Current team: Valdepeñas

Youth career
- Salitas

Senior career*
| Years | Team | Apps | (Gls) |
| 2017–2018 | Salitas | | |
| 2019–2020 | Kortrijk | 1 | (0) |
| 2020–2022 | Almería B | 49 | (2) |
| 2022–2023 | Atlético Pulpileño | 27 | (1) |
| 2024– | Valdepeñas | 3 | (0) |
- * Club domestic league appearances and goals as of 13 October 2024

Jean Marco Toualy Dié (born 26 February 1999) is an Ivorian footballer who plays as a winger for Spanish side Valdepeñas.

== Club career ==
On 13 July 2018, after spending three weeks on trial, Toualy signed a three-year contract with Belgian Pro League side Kortrijk joining from Salitas. He made his debut for the club on 14 May 2019, coming on as a second-half substitute for Imoh Ezekiel in a 2–0 away loss against Union Saint-Gilloise.

On 30 December 2019, Toualy agreed to a deal with Spanish side UD Almería, after a trial period; he was initially assigned to the B-team in Tercera División.

== Career statistics ==
=== Club ===
As of 1 February 2020.

| Club | Season | League | | | Cup | | Continental | | Other | | Total | |
| Club | Season | Division | Apps | Goals | Apps | Goals | Apps | Goals | Apps | Goals | Apps | Goals |
|---|---|---|---|---|---|---|---|---|---|---|---|---|
| Kortrijk | 2018–19 | Jupiler Pro League | 0 | 0 | 0 | 0 | – | | 1 (Note: Appearances in the Europa League play-offs) | 0 | 1 | 0 |
| Kortrijk | 2019–20 | Jupiler Pro League | 0 | 0 | 0 | 0 | – | | 0 | 0 | 0 | 0 |
| Kortrijk | Total | | 0 | 0 | 0 | 0 | 0 | 0 | 1 | 0 | 1 | 0 |
| Almería B | 2019–20 | Tercera División | 0 | 0 | 0 | 0 | – | | 0 | 0 | 0 | 0 |
| Career total | | | 0 | 0 | 0 | 0 | 0 | 0 | 1 | 0 | 1 | 0 |
