= List of Belgian football transfers summer 2017 =

This is a list of Belgian football transfers for the 2017 summer transfer window. Only transfers involving a team from the professional divisions are listed, including the 16 teams in the Belgian First Division A and the 8 teams playing in the Belgian First Division B.

The summer transfer window will open on 1 July 2017, although some transfers were announced prior to that date. Players without a club may join one at any time, either during or in between transfer windows. The transfer window ends on 1 September 2017, although a few completed transfers could still be announced a few days later.

== Sorted by date ==
=== January 2017 ===
Date	Name	Moving from	Moving to	Fee	Note
12 January 2017	Germán Mera	Deportivo Cali	Club Brugge	Undisclosed	

=== February 2017 ===
Date	Name	Moving from	Moving to	Fee	Note
26 February 2017	Joseph Biersard	Eupen	Hamoir	Undisclosed	

=== March 2017 ===
Date	Name	Moving from	Moving to	Fee	Note
5 March 2017	Antonio Muñoz-Herrera	Beerschot Wilrijk	KRC Gent	Undisclosed	(Note: Muñoz-Herrera was on loan from Beerschot Wilrijk to Rupel Boom during the 2016-17 season. The loan ended and Muñoz Herrera was sold to KRC Gent.)
14 March 2017	Uroš Spajić	Toulouse	Anderlecht	Undisclosed	(Note: Spajić was on loan from Toulouse to Anderlecht during the 2016-17 season. Although Anderlecht had not acquired an option to make the deal permanent, they agreed on a lump transfer sum to sign Spajić permanently.)
15 March 2017	Kenny Thompson	Beerschot Wilrijk	Nijlen	Free	
16 March 2017	Ricardo Ávila	Chorrillo	Gent	Undisclosed	
20 March 2017	Jore Trompet	Westerlo	Temse	Free	(Note: Trompet was on loan from Westerlo to Rupel Boom during the 2016-17 season, the loan ended and Trompet was released to Temse.)
23 March 2017	Nicolas Lombaerts	Zenit Saint Petersburg	Oostende	Undisclosed	
24 March 2017	Jorn Brondeel	Lierse	Twente	Undisclosed	(Note: Brondeel was on loan from Lierse to NAC Breda during the 2016-17 season, the loan ended and Brondeel was sold to Twente.)
30 March 2017	Łukasz Teodorczyk	Dynamo Kyiv	Anderlecht	Undisclosed	(Note: Teodorczyk was on loan from Dynamo Kyiv to Anderlecht during the 2016-17 season, including an option to make the deal permanent. Anderlecht chose to pay the agreed amount to Dynamo Kyiv and offer Teodorczyk a permanent contract.)

=== April 2017 ===
Date	Name	Moving from	Moving to	Fee	Note
3 April 2017	Robbie Ringoet	Lokeren	Wetteren	Undisclosed	
4 April 2017	Elton Acolatse	Westerlo	Club Brugge	Undisclosed	
10 April 2017	Mégan Laurent	Tubize	Lierse	Free	
12 April 2017	Pierre Bourdin	Cercle Brugge	Lierse	Free	
12 April 2017	Justin Verlinden	Oostende	Knokke	Undisclosed	
13 April 2017	Glenn Leemans	Waasland-Beveren	Londerzeel	Undisclosed	(Note: Leemans was on loan from Waasland-Beveren to Deinze during the 2016-17 season. The loan ended and Leemans was sold to Londerzeel.)
17 April 2017	Roman Ferber	Charleroi	Union SG	Undisclosed	(Note: Ferber was on loan from Charleroi to Excel Mouscron during the 2016-17 season. The loan ended and Ferber was sold to Union SG.)
25 April 2017	Jordy Huysmans	Antwerp	Berchem Sport	Undisclosed	

=== May 2017 ===
Date	Name	Moving from	Moving to	Fee	Note
3 May 2017	Erhan Mašović	Čukarički	Club Brugge	Undisclosed	
4 May 2017	Tim Hall	SV Elversberg	Lierse	Free	
4 May 2017	Ivan Yagan	Cercle Brugge	Lierse	Free	
5 May 2017	Mehdi Bounou	OH Leuven	Heist	Free	
5 May 2017	Joachim Van Damme	Free Agent	Waasland-Beveren	NA	
8 May 2017	Théo Defourny	Excel Mouscron	Tubize	Free	
9 May 2017	Bernie Ibini-Isei	Club Brugge	Vancouver Whitecaps	Undisclosed	(Note: Ibini-Isei was on loan from Club Brugge to Sydney during the 2016-17 season. The loan ended and Ibini-Isei was sold to Vancouver Whitecaps.)
9 May 2017	Dimitris Kolovos	Olympiacos	Mechelen	Undisclosed	(Note: Kolovos was already on loan from Olympiacos to Mechelen during the 2016-17 season and the deal was now made permanent.)
9 May 2017	Joakim Mæhle	AaB	Genk	Undisclosed	
10 May 2017	Ahmed El Messaoudi	Lierse	Mechelen	Undisclosed	(Note: El Messaoudi was already on loan from Lierse to Mechelen during the 2016-17 season and the deal was now made permanent.)
11 May 2017	Marco Bizot	Genk	AZ	Free	
11 May 2017	Filip Daems	Westerlo	Free Agent	Retired	
11 May 2017	Samy Kehli	Roeselare	Lokeren	Undisclosed	
11 May 2017	Luciano Slagveer	Heerenveen	Lokeren	Free	
11 May 2017	Sandy Walsh	Genk	Zulte Waregem	Free	
12 May 2017	Geoffrey Cabeke	Union SG	RWDM47	Undisclosed	
14 May 2017	Thomas De Bie	Cercle Brugge	Oostende	Free	
15 May 2017	Wouter Corstjens	Lommel	Westerlo	Undisclosed	
15 May 2017	Kenneth Houdret	OH Leuven	Union SG	Free	
15 May 2017	Michiel Jaeken	Antwerp	Westerlo	Undisclosed	(Note: Jaeken was on loan from Antwerp to Deinze during the second half of the 2016-17 season. The loan ended and Jaeken was sold to Westerlo.)
16 May 2017	Ayrton Mboko	Standard Liège	Union SG	Undisclosed	
18 May 2017	Merveille Bokadi	TP Mazembe	Standard Liège	Undisclosed	(Note: Bokadi, Bolingi and Luyindama were already on loan from TP Mazembe to Standard during the second half of the 2016-17 season and Standard exercised the option to make the deal permanent.)
18 May 2017	Jonathan Bolingi	TP Mazembe	Standard Liège	Undisclosed	
18 May 2017	Christian Luyindama	TP Mazembe	Standard Liège	Undisclosed	
18 May 2017	Vincent Vandiepenbeeck	Union SG	RWDM47	Undisclosed	
19 May 2017	Clément Fabre	Tubize	OH Leuven	Undisclosed	
19 May 2017	Kenneth Schuermans	Westerlo	OH Leuven	Undisclosed	
22 May 2017	Corentin Kocur	Excel Mouscron	Fola Esch	Free	(Note: Kocur was loan from Excel Mouscron to Westhoek during the second half of the 2016-17 season. The loan ended and Kocur was released to Fola Esch.)
22 May 2017	Bennard Kumordzi	Genk	Kortrijk	Free	
22 May 2017	Nicolas Rajsel	Union SG	Oostende	Undisclosed	
22 May 2017	Marten Schevenels	Genk	Sint-Truiden	Undisclosed	
22 May 2017	Robin Söder	Esbjerg	Lokeren	Undisclosed	
22 May 2017	Mamadou Sylla	Eupen	Espanyol	Loan Return	
22 May 2017	Mamadou Sylla	Espanyol	Gent	Undisclosed	
23 May 2017	Henrik Dalsgaard	Zulte Waregem	Brentford	Undisclosed	
24 May 2017	Isaac Kiese Thelin	Bordeaux	Anderlecht	Loan Extended	(Note: Thelin was already on loan from Bordeaux to Anderlecht during the second half of the 2016-17 season. Both parties agreed to extend the deal with one season. Anderlecht also acquired an option to make the deal permanent.)
24 May 2017	Youri Tielemans	Anderlecht	Monaco	23.000.000 €	
25 May 2017	Anthony Sadin	Union SG	RWDM47	Undisclosed	
27 May 2017	Karim Essikal	Zulte Waregem	Beerschot Wilrijk	Undisclosed	(Note: Essikal was on loan from Zulte Waregem to Excel Mouscron during the 2016-17 season. The loan ended and Essikal was sold to Beerschot Wilrijk.)
29 May 2017	Ruslan Malinovskyi	Shakhtar Donetsk	Genk	Undisclosed	(Note: Malinovskyi was already on loan from Shakhtar Donetsk to Genk since the 2015–16 winter transfer window. Genk exercised the option to make the deal permanent.)
29 May 2017	Faycal Rherras	Heart of Midlothian	Mechelen	Free	
30 May 2017	Emmanuel Bonaventure Dennis	Zorya Luhansk	Club Brugge	Undisclosed	
31 May 2017	Souleymane Aw	Aspire Academy	Eupen	Undisclosed	
31 May 2017	Abdul Manaf Nurudeen	Aspire Academy	Eupen	Undisclosed	
31 May 2017	Carlos Martínez	Aspire Academy	Eupen	Undisclosed	
31 May 2017	Jordy Peffer	Mechelen	Westerlo	Loan	
31 May 2017	Thibault Peyre	Excel Mouscron	Union SG	Undisclosed	
31 May 2017	Mathieu Vanderschaeghe	Cercle Brugge	Mandel United	Undisclosed	

=== End of 2016–17 season ===
After the end of the 2016–17 season, several players will return from loan to another club or will not have their contracts extended. These will be listed here when the date is otherwise not specified.

Date	Name	Moving from	Moving to	Fee	Note
End of 2016-17 season	Hatem Abd Elhamed	Gent	Ashdod	Undisclosed	(Note: Abd Elhamed was on loan from Gent to Ashdod, the loan ended and Abd Elhamed moved permanently to Ashdod.)
End of 2016-17 season	Fahad Al-Abdulrahman	Eupen	Al Sadd	Loan Return	
End of 2016-17 season	Alessio Alessandro	Hades	Westerlo	Loan Return	
End of 2016-17 season	Charles Ankomah	Lierse	Free Agent	End of contract	
End of 2016-17 season	Mickaël Antoine-Curier	Union SG	Free Agent	Released	(Note: Antoine-Curier was on loan from Union SG to Eendracht Aalst, the loan ended and Antoine-Curier was released.)
End of 2016-17 season	Pierre‑Baptiste Baherlé	Union SG	Free Agent	Released	
End of 2016-17 season	Anthony Bassey	Eupen	Free Agent	Released	
End of 2016-17 season	Mehdi Beneddine	Cercle Brugge	Monaco	Loan Return	
End of 2016-17 season	Yohan Betsch	Tubize	Free Agent	Released	
End of 2016-17 season	Jean-Paul Boëtius	Genk	Basel	Loan Return	
End of 2016-17 season	Serhiy Bolbat	Lokeren	Shakhtar Donetsk	Loan Return	
End of 2016-17 season	Christian Brüls	Eupen	Free Agent	Released	
End of 2016-17 season	Illies Bruylandts	RWDM47	Lierse	Loan Return	
End of 2016-17 season	Yoni Buyens	Westerlo	Genk	Loan Return	
End of 2016-17 season	José María Cases	Eupen	Free Agent	End of contract	
End of 2016-17 season	Yoran Chalon	Union SG	Acren Lessines	Free	(Note: Chalon was on loan from Union SG to Rebecq, the loan ended and Chalon was released to Acren Lessines.)
End of 2016-17 season	Xavier Chen	Mechelen	Free Agent	End of contract	
End of 2016-17 season	Li Chenglong	Roeselare	Beijing Renhe	Loan Return	
End of 2016-17 season	Tafsir Chérif	Cercle Brugge	Monaco	Loan Return	
End of 2016-17 season	Cristián Cuevas	Sint-Truiden	Chelsea	Loan Return	
End of 2016-17 season	Danilo	Standard Liège	Braga	Loan Return	
End of 2016-17 season	Matej Delač	Excel Mouscron	Chelsea	Loan Return	
End of 2016-17 season	Nicolas Delporte	OH Leuven	Free Agent	Released	
End of 2016-17 season	Muhammed Demirci	Excel Mouscron	İstanbulspor	Undisclosed	(Note: Demirci was already on loan from Excel Mouscron to İstanbulspor and both clubs agreed to make the deal permanent.)
End of 2016-17 season	Nicolas de Préville	Oostende	Lille	Loan Return	(Note: De Préville was already on loan from Oostende to Lille and both clubs agreed to make the deal permanent.)
End of 2016-17 season	Diawandou Diagne	Barcelona B	Eupen	Undisclosed	(Note: Diagne was already on loan from Barcelona B to Eupen since the 2015 summer transfer window. Eupen exercised the option to make the deal permanent.)
End of 2016-17 season	Boubakar Diallo	KRC Gent	Gent	Loan Return	
End of 2016-17 season	Raphaël Diarra	Cercle Brugge	Monaco	Loan Return	
End of 2016-17 season	Nathan Durieux	OH Leuven	Free Agent	Released	
End of 2016-17 season	Cédric Fauré	Union SG	Free Agent	Retired	
End of 2016-17 season	Georgios Galitsios	Lokeren	Free Agent	End of contract	
End of 2016-17 season	Nicolas Garcia	Tubize	Grimbergen	Free	
End of 2016-17 season	Bo Geens	MVV	Lokeren	Loan Return	
End of 2016-17 season	Kevin Geudens	Beerschot Wilrijk	De Kempen	Free	
End of 2016-17 season	Nikola Gulan	Excel Mouscron	Free Agent	Released	
End of 2016-17 season	David Habarugira	Lierse	Free Agent	Released	
End of 2016-17 season	Peter Hackenberg	Eupen	Free Agent	Released	
End of 2016-17 season	Anas Hamzaoui	Tubize	Union SG	Undisclosed	
End of 2016-17 season	Hamdi Harbaoui	Charleroi	Anderlecht	Loan Return	
End of 2016-17 season	Robin Henkens	Westerlo	Free Agent	Released	
End of 2016-17 season	Siebe Horemans	OH Leuven	Gent	Loan Return	
End of 2016-17 season	Georgios Kaminiaris	Union SG	Free Agent	End of contract	
End of 2016-17 season	Djaïd Kasri	Antwerp	Free Agent	Released	
End of 2016-17 season	Sega Keita	Tubize	Free Agent	Released	
End of 2016-17 season	Raoul Kenne	Eupen	Free Agent	Released	
End of 2016-17 season	Jonathan Kindermans	OH Leuven	Free Agent	Released	
End of 2016-17 season	Fazlı Kocabaş	OH Leuven	Free Agent	Released	
End of 2016-17 season	Rodgers Kola	Hapoel Ra'anana	Gent	Loan Return	
End of 2016-17 season	François Kompany	Roeselare	Free Agent	Released	
End of 2016-17 season	László Köteles	Waasland-Beveren	Genk	Loan Return	
End of 2016-17 season	Michaël Lallemand	Antwerp	Kortrijk	Loan Return	
End of 2016-17 season	Eric Lanini	Westerlo	Juventus	Loan Return	
End of 2016-17 season	Gilles Lentz	Cercle Brugge	Kortrijk	Loan Return	
End of 2016-17 season	Cristian Manea	Excel Mouscron	Apollon Limassol	Loan Return	
End of 2016-17 season	Filip Marković	Excel Mouscron	Free Agent	Released	
End of 2016-17 season	Luca Marrone	Zulte Waregem	Juventus	Loan Return	
End of 2016-17 season	Rubén Martínez	Anderlecht	Deportivo La Coruña	Loan Return	
End of 2016-17 season	Ilombe Mboyo	Cercle Brugge	Sion	Loan Return	
End of 2016-17 season	Brandon Mechele	Sint-Truiden	Club Brugge	Loan Return	
End of 2016-17 season	Cedric Mingiedi	Hamme	Mechelen	Loan Return	
End of 2016-17 season	Farouk Miya	Excel Mouscron	Standard Liège	Loan Return	
End of 2016-17 season	Phakamani Mngadi	Eupen	Free Agent	Released	
End of 2016-17 season	Jordan Mustoe	Westerlo	Free Agent	Released	
End of 2016-17 season	Quentin Ngakoutou	Union SG	Monaco	Loan Return	
End of 2016-17 season	Soma Novothny	Sint-Truiden	Újpest	Undisclosed	(Note: FIFA sanctioned Újpest in 2016 not allowing them to acquire Novothny and Zsótér, Sint-Truiden agreed to acquire both players and loan them out for one season respectively to Diósgyőr and Budapest Honvéd. The loans ended and Novothny and Zsótér will now move to Újpest.)
End of 2016-17 season	Brice Ntambwe	Oosterzonen Oosterwijk	Lierse	Loan Return	
End of 2016-17 season	Jonathan Okita	Union SG	Standard Liège	Loan Return	
End of 2016-17 season	Hervé Onana	Union SG	Free Agent	Released	(Note: Onana was on loan from Union SG to Bornem, the loan ended and Onana was released.)
End of 2016-17 season	Nebojša Pavlović	Kortrijk	Free Agent	Retired	
End of 2016-17 season	Nick Proschwitz	Sint-Truiden	Free Agent	End of contract	
End of 2016-17 season	Ntuthuko Radebe	Eupen	Free Agent	End of contract	
End of 2016-17 season	Bjorn Ruytinx	Beerschot Wilrijk	Free Agent	Released	
End of 2016-17 season	Mathew Ryan	Genk	Valencia	Loan Return	
End of 2016-17 season	Idriss Saadi	Kortrijk	Cardiff City	Loan Return	
End of 2016-17 season	Brahim Sabaouni	Tubize	Lierse	Loan Return	
End of 2016-17 season	Abdoulaye Sanogo	Eupen	Free Agent	Released	
End of 2016-17 season	Lucas Schoofs	OH Leuven	Gent	Loan Return	
End of 2016-17 season	Jeroen Simaeys	OH Leuven	Free Agent	Released	(Note: Simaeys suffered an ankle injury in December 2016 and was diagnosed as no longer able to play football at a professional level. OH Leuven and Simaeys have made financial arrangements to terminate his contract early, releasing him at an unspecified moment in 2017.)
End of 2016-17 season	Stefan Simić	Excel Mouscron	Milan	Loan Return	
End of 2016-17 season	Laurenz Simoens	Cercle Brugge	Gullegem	Undisclosed	(Note: Simoens was already on loan from Cercle Brugge to Gullegem and both clubs agreed to make the deal permanent.)
End of 2016-17 season	Alhassane Soumah	Cercle Brugge	Juventus	Loan Return	
End of 2016-17 season	Fabien Tchenkoua	Sint-Truiden	Free Agent	Released	
End of 2016-17 season	Andriy Totovytskyi	Kortrijk	Shakhtar Donetsk	Loan Return	
End of 2016-17 season	Vagner	Boavista	Excel Mouscron	Loan Return	
End of 2016-17 season	Maxim Vandewalle	Cercle Brugge	Knokke	Undisclosed	(Note: Vandewalle was already on loan from Cercle Brugge to Knokke and both clubs agreed to make the deal permanent.)
End of 2016-17 season	Lukas Van Eenoo	Roeselare	Kortrijk	Loan Return	
End of 2016-17 season	Wout Van Poucke	Roeselare	Harelbeke	Undisclosed Return	
End of 2016-17 season	Sun Weizhe	Roeselare	Beijing Renhe	Loan Return	
End of 2016-17 season	Donát Zsótér	Sint-Truiden	Újpest	Undisclosed	

=== June 2017 ===
Date	Name	Moving from	Moving to	Fee	Note
1 June 2017	Jean Chopin	Oostende	Union Titus Pétange	Undisclosed	
1 June 2017	Ayanda Patosi	Lokeren	Cape Town City	Undisclosed	
1 June 2017	Dennis Van Vaerenbergh	Club Brugge	Eindhoven	Loan	
2 June 2017	Christophe Bertjens	Lommel	Westerlo	Free	
2 June 2017	Charni Ekangamene	Zulte Waregem	Beerschot Wilrijk	Undisclosed	(Note: Ekangamene was on loan from Zulte Waregem to NAC Breda during the 2016-17 season. The loan ended and Ekangamene was sold to Beerschot Wilrijk.)
2 June 2017	Soufiane El Banouhi	OH Leuven	Union SG	Undisclosed	
2 June 2017	Sven Kums	Watford	Anderlecht	Undisclosed	
2 June 2017	Anthony Schuster	Les Herbiers	Tubize	Undisclosed	
3 June 2017	Ibrahima Bah	Standard Liège	Oostende	Undisclosed	
3 June 2017	Logan Ndembe	Excel Mouscron	Oostende	Undisclosed	
6 June 2017	Joãozinho	Kortrijk	Tondela	Undisclosed	
6 June 2017	Ryota Morioka	Śląsk Wrocław	Waasland-Beveren	Undisclosed	
6 June 2017	Romain Reynaud	OH Leuven	Andrézieux-Bouthéon	Free	
7 June 2017	Fabien Antunes	Oostende	Sint-Truiden	Undisclosed	
7 June 2017	Guy Dufour	Eupen	Roeselare	Undisclosed	
7 June 2017	Marko Maletić	Lommel	Roeselare	Undisclosed	
7 June 2017	Simon Vermeiren	Beerschot Wilrijk	Lommel	Undisclosed	
9 June 2017	Aboubakary Koita	ASV Geel	Gent	Undisclosed	
9 June 2017	Christophe Lepoint	Zulte Waregem	Kortrijk	Undisclosed	
9 June 2017	Orel Mangala	Anderlecht	VfB Stuttgart	Undisclosed	(Note: Mangala was on loan from Anderlecht to Borussia Dortmund during the 2016-17 season. The loan ended and Mangala was sold to Stuttgart.)
9 June 2017	Ben Reichert	Hapoel Tel Aviv	Zulte Waregem	Undisclosed	
9 June 2017	Jellert Van Landschoot	Club Brugge	Eindhoven	Loan	
9 June 2017	Bryan Verboom	Zulte Waregem	Kortrijk	Loan	(Note: Verboom was on loan from Zulte Waregem to Roda JC during the second half of the 2016-17 season. The loan ended and Verboom was now loaned to Kortrijk.)
9 June 2017	Julien Vercauteren	RNK Split	Union SG	Undisclosed	
10 June 2017	Nill De Pauw	Guingamp	Zulte Waregem	Undisclosed	
10 June 2017	Lukas Lerager	Zulte Waregem	Bordeaux	Undisclosed	
12 June 2017	Yady Bangoura	ASV Geel	Union SG	Undisclosed	
12 June 2017	Mamadou Diallo	Tubize	Union SG	Free	
12 June 2017	Jens Naessens	Mechelen	Westerlo	Free	(Note: Naessens was on loan from Mechelen to Zulte Waregem during the 2016-17 season. The loan ended and Naessens was released to Westerlo.)
12 June 2017	Octávio	Botafogo	Beerschot Wilrijk	Undisclosed	
12 June 2017	Alessio Palmeri	Union SG	Olympic Charleroi	Undisclosed	
12 June 2017	Arne Sabbe	Roeselare	Sint-Eloois-Winkel	Undisclosed	
12 June 2017	Pierrick Valdivia	Sint-Truiden	Nîmes	Undisclosed	
13 June 2017	Geert Berben	Lommel	OH Leuven	Undisclosed	
13 June 2017	Julien Gorius	Changchun Yatai	OH Leuven	Free	
13 June 2017	Daniel Graovac	Excel Mouscron	Željezničar	Loan	(Note: Graovac was on loan from Excel Mouscron to Zrinjski Mostar during the second half of the 2016-17 season. The loan ended and Graovac was now loaned to Željezničar.)
13 June 2017	Kevin Kis	Roeselare	Union SG	Undisclosed	
13 June 2017	Serge Tabekou	Gent	Union SG	Undisclosed	(Note: Tabekou was on loan from Gent to OH Leuven during the 2016-17 season. The loan ended and Tabekou was sold to Union SG.)
14 June 2017	Jur Schryvers	Club Brugge	Waasland-Beveren	Undisclosed	
15 June 2017	Jean-Luc Dompé	Standard Liège	Amiens	Loan	(Note: Dompé was on loan from Standard Liège to Eupen during the 2016–17 season. The loan ended and Dompé was now loaned to Amiens.)
15 June 2017	Stefano Marzo	Heerenveen	Lokeren	Undisclosed	
15 June 2017	Kaveh Rezaei	Esteghlal	Charleroi	Undisclosed	
15 June 2017	Nikola Storm	Club Brugge	OH Leuven	Loan	(Note: Storm was already on loan from Club Brugge to OH Leuven since the 2016–17 winter transfer window and the loan was extended by one season.)
16 June 2017	Hassane Bandé	Salitas	Mechelen	Undisclosed	
16 June 2017	Gertjan De Mets	Kortrijk	Zulte Waregem	Undisclosed	
16 June 2017	Guillaume Hubert	Standard Liège	Club Brugge	Undisclosed	
16 June 2017	Tracy Mpati	Union SG	Lokeren	Undisclosed	
16 June 2017	Paul Nardi	Monaco	Cercle Brugge	Loan	(Note: Nardi was already on loan from Monaco to Cercle Brugge during the previous season and the loan was extended by one season.)
16 June 2017	Sébastien Pocognoli	West Bromwich Albion	Standard Liège	Undisclosed	
16 June 2017	Nicolas Timmermans	Eupen	RWDM47	Free	
16 June 2017	Richairo Zivkovic	Ajax	Oostende	Undisclosed	
17 June 2017	Soualiho Meïté	Zulte Waregem	Monaco	Undisclosed	(Note: Meïté was on loan from Lille to Zulte Waregem during the 2016-17 season. Zulte Waregem had exercised the option to make the deal permanent for a fee of 300 000 € only to then sell Meïté to Monaco.)
17 June 2017	Tom Van Hyfte	Roda JC	Beerschot Wilrijk	Free	
18 June 2017	Keres Masangu	Mechelen	Roma	Undisclosed	
19 June 2017	Franko Andrijašević	Rijeka	Gent	Undisclosed	
19 June 2017	Sébastien Bruzzese	Club Brugge	Kortrijk	Undisclosed	(Note: Bruzzese was on loan from Club Brugge to Sint-Truiden during the second half of the 2016-17 season. The loan ended and Bruzzese was sold to Kortrijk.)
19 June 2017	Landry Dimata	Oostende	VfL Wolfsburg	€10,000,000	
19 June 2017	Jonathan Farias	Boca Juniors	Cercle Brugge	Undisclosed	
19 June 2017	Pieter Gerkens	Sint-Truiden	Anderlecht	Undisclosed	
19 June 2017	Ewout Gouw	Vitesse	Tubize	Free	
19 June 2017	Moussa Traoré	Siah Jamegan	Tubize	Free	
20 June 2017	Stéphane Badji	Anderlecht	Kayserispor	Loan	
20 June 2017	Ofir Davidzada	Gent	Maccabi Tel Aviv	Loan	
20 June 2017	Lior Inebrum	Ashdod	Gent	Undisclosed	
20 June 2017	Pieter-Jan Monteyne	OH Leuven	Roeselare	Undisclosed	
20 June 2017	Marvelous Nakamba	Vitesse	Club Brugge	Undisclosed	
20 June 2017	Peter Olayinka	Gent	Zulte Waregem	Loan	(Note: Olayinka was on loan from Gent to Dukla Prague during the 2016-17 season. The loan ended and Olayinka was now loaned to Zulte Waregem.)
20 June 2017	Laurens Vermijl	Genk	Lommel	Free	
21 June 2017	Jakob Ankersen	Zulte Waregem	AGF	Undisclosed	
21 June 2017	Sebastian De Maio	Anderlecht	Bologna	Undisclosed	(Note: De Maio was on loan from Anderlecht to Fiorentina during the 2016-17 season. The loan ended and De Maio was now sold to Bologna.)
21 June 2017	Michaël Heylen	Anderlecht	Zulte Waregem	Undisclosed	(Note: Heylen was on loan from Anderlecht to Westerlo during the 2016-17 season. The loan ended and Heylen was now sold to Zulte Waregem.)
21 June 2017	Aaron Leya Iseka	Anderlecht	Zulte Waregem	Loan	(Note: Leya Iseka was on loan from Anderlecht to Marseille during the 2016-17 season. The loan ended and Leya Iseka was now loaned to Zulte Waregem.)
21 June 2017	Damien Marcq	Charleroi	Gent	Undisclosed	
21 June 2017	Jordi Vanlerberghe	Mechelen	Club Brugge	Undisclosed	
21 June 2017	Nicolas Verdier	Mechelen	Eupen	Undisclosed	
21 June 2017	Gustav Wikheim	Gent	Midtjylland	Undisclosed	(Note: Wikheim was already on loan from Gent to Midtjylland during the 2016-17 season. All parties agreed to make the transfer permanent.)
22 June 2017	Manuel Benson	Lierse	Genk	Undisclosed	
22 June 2017	Boli Bolingoli-Mbombo	Club Brugge	Rapid Wien	Undisclosed	(Note: Bolingoli-Mbombo was on loan from Club Brugge to Sint-Truiden during the second half of the 2016-17 season. The loan ended and Bolingoli-Mbombo was sold to Rapid Wien.)
22 June 2017	Constant Delsanne	Union SG	Rebecq	Undisclosed	(Note: Delsanne was on loan from Union SG to RWDM during the 2016-17 season. The loan ended and Delsanne was sold to Rebecq.)
22 June 2017	Yannis Mbombo	Örebro	Excel Mouscron	Undisclosed	
22 June 2017	Nicklas Pedersen	Oostende	Mechelen	Free	
22 June 2017	Stef Peeters	Sint-Truiden	Caen	Undisclosed	
22 June 2017	Matz Sels	Newcastle United	Anderlecht	Loan	
23 June 2017	Carlens Arcus	Lille	Cercle Brugge	Undisclosed	
23 June 2017	Núrio Fortuna	Braga	Charleroi	Undisclosed	
23 June 2017	Jonathan Mexique	Monaco	Cercle Brugge	Loan	
23 June 2017	Guévin Tormin	Monaco	Cercle Brugge	Loan	
26 June 2017	Emmanuel Banda	Esmoriz	Oostende	Undisclosed	
26 June 2017	Kjetil Borry	Waasland-Beveren	Roeselare	Undisclosed	
26 June 2017	Jordan Botaka	Leeds United	Sint-Truiden	Undisclosed	
26 June 2017	Fran Brodić	Club Brugge	Roeselare	Loan	
26 June 2017	Vagner Gonçalves	Sabutarlo	Cercle Brugge	Undisclosed	
26 June 2017	Pierre-Yves Ngawa	OH Leuven	Avellino	Undisclosed	
26 June 2017	Brian Vandenbussche	Gent	Cercle Brugge	Free	
26 June 2017	Igor Vetokele	Charlton Athletic	Sint-Truiden	Loan	(Note: Vetokele was already on loan from Charlton Athletic to Sint-Truiden during the second half of the 2016-17 season. The loan was extended by one season.)
27 June 2017	Stephen Buyl	Zulte Waregem	Cercle Brugge	Undisclosed	(Note: Buyl was on loan from Zulte Waregem to Antwerp during the 2016-17 season. The loan ended and Buyl was sold to Cercle Brugge.)
27 June 2017	Julien De Sart	Middlesbrough	Zulte Waregem	Loan	
27 June 2017	Ridwan Gyselinck	Lokeren	Eendracht Aalst	Undisclosed	
27 June 2017	Abdelkarim Hassan	Al Sadd	Eupen	Loan	
27 June 2017	Rabiu Ibrahim	Gent	Slovan Bratislava	€1,000,000	
27 June 2017	Andy Kawaya	Anderlecht	Mechelen	Undisclosed	(Note: Kawaya was on loan from Anderlecht to Willem II since the second half of the 2015-16 season. The loan ended and Kawaya was sold to Mechelen.)
27 June 2017	Clément Libertiaux	Charleroi	Excel Mouscron	Undisclosed	
27 June 2017	Hervé Matthys	Anderlecht	Eindhoven	Undisclosed	(Note: Matthys was on loan from Anderlecht to Westerlo since the second half of the 2015-16 season. The loan ended and Matthys was now sold to Eindhoven.)
27 June 2017	Tom Raes	Roeselare	Mandel United	Undisclosed	(Note: Raes was on loan from Roeselare to Hamme during the second half of the 2016-17 season. The loan ended and Raes was now sold to Mandel United.)
27 June 2017	Konstantinos Rougalas	Târgu Mureș	Westerlo	Undisclosed	
27 June 2017	Gilles Ruyssen	Westerlo	Lommel	Undisclosed	
27 June 2017	Danny Vukovic	Sydney	Genk	Undisclosed	
28 June 2017	Yannick Aguemon	Union SG	OH Leuven	Undisclosed	
28 June 2017	Jean Butez	Lille	Excel Mouscron	Loan	
28 June 2017	Charis Charisis	PAOK	Sint-Truiden	Loan	
28 June 2017	Babacar Guèye	Hannover 96	Sint-Truiden	Loan	(Note: Guèye was on loan from Hannover to Zulte Waregem since the second half of the 2016-17 season. The loan ended and Guèye was now loaned to Sint-Truiden.)
28 June 2017	Nikola Jambor	Lokeren	Osijek	Loan	
28 June 2017	Stelios Kitsiou	PAOK	Sint-Truiden	Loan	
28 June 2017	Nemanja Miletić	Westerlo	Partizan	Undisclosed	
28 June 2017	Trezeguet	Anderlecht	Kasımpaşa	Loan	(Note: Trezeguet was on loan from Anderlecht to Excel Mouscron during the 2016-17 season. The loan ended and Trezeguet was now loaned to Kasımpaşa.)
28 June 2017	Ben Yagan	OH Leuven	Dessel Sport	Free	
29 June 2017	Jordan Lotiès	Dijon	Eupen	Undisclosed	
29 June 2017	Tristan Muyumba	Monaco	Cercle Brugge	Loan	
29 June 2017	Sidy Sarr	Kortrijk	Châteauroux	Loan	
30 June 2017	Benjamin Delacourt	Deinze	Cercle Brugge	Undisclosed	
30 June 2017	Henry Onyekuru	Eupen	Everton	Undisclosed	
30 June 2017	Henry Onyekuru	Everton	Anderlecht	Loan	
30 June 2017	Lloyd Palun	Red Star	Cercle Brugge	Undisclosed	

=== July 2017 ===
Date	Name	Moving from	Moving to	Fee	Note
1 July 2017	Massimo Bruno	RB Leipzig	Anderlecht	Loan	(Note: Bruno was already on loan from Leipzig to Anderlecht during the 2016-17 season. The loan was extended for another season.)
1 July 2017	Adam Marušić	Oostende	Lazio	Undisclosed	
1 July 2017	Samy Mmaee	Standard Liège	MVV	Loan	
1 July 2017	Jérémy Perbet	Gent	Club Brugge	Undisclosed	
2 July 2017	Dodi Lukebakio	Anderlecht	Charleroi	Loan	(Note: Lukebakio was on loan from Anderlecht to Toulouse during the 2016-17 season. The loan ended and Lukebakio was now loaned to Charleroi.)
3 July 2017	Quentin Beunardeau	Tubize	Metz	Free	
3 July 2017	Gianni Bruno	Evian	Cercle Brugge	Undisclosed	
3 July 2017	Michaël Clepkens	Beerschot Wilrijk	Lommel	Loan	
3 July 2017	Paul-José M'Poku	Chievo	Standard Liège	Undisclosed	
3 July 2017	Fabrice N'Sakala	Anderlecht	Alanyaspor	Undisclosed	
3 July 2017	Ivan Šaponjić	Benfica	Zulte Waregem	Loan	
3 July 2017	Nils Schouterden	Mechelen	Eupen	Undisclosed	
3 July 2017	Mickaël Tirpan	Excel Mouscron	Eupen	Undisclosed	
4 July 2017	Selim Amallah	Tubize	Excel Mouscron	Undisclosed	
4 July 2017	Jo Coppens	Roeselare	Carl Zeiss Jena	Undisclosed	
4 July 2017	Alexander Corryn	Mechelen	Antwerp	Loan	(Note: Corryn was already on loan from Mechelen to Antwerp during the 2016-17 season. The loan was extended for another season.)
4 July 2017	Danzell Gravenberch	Reading	Roeselare	Loan	
4 July 2017	Lex Immers	Club Brugge	ADO	Free	
5 July 2017	Abdul Jeleel Ajagun	Panathinaikos	Kortrijk	Undisclosed	
5 July 2017	Kule Mbombo	Vita Club	Beerschot Wilrijk	Loan	
5 July 2017	Marko Nikolić	Westerlo	Brommapojkarna	Free	
5 July 2017	Rafael Romo	APOEL	Beerschot Wilrijk	Undisclosed	
5 July 2017	Rob Schoofs	Gent	Mechelen	Undisclosed	
6 July 2017	Darwin Andrade	Standard Liège	Deportivo Cali	Undisclosed	
6 July 2017	Jonathan Bolingi	Standard Liège	Excel Mouscron	Loan	
6 July 2017	Sander Coopman	Club Brugge	Zulte Waregem	Loan	(Note: Coopman was already on loan from Lierse to Lens during the 2016-17 season. A new loan deal was set up for one season.)
6 July 2017	Omar Govea	Porto	Excel Mouscron	Loan	
7 July 2017	Timothy Castagne	Genk	Atalanta	6.000.000 €	
7 July 2017	Ibrahima Cissé	Standard Liège	Fulham	Undisclosed	
7 July 2017	Moussa Diallo	Union La Calamine	Eupen	Undisclosed	
7 July 2017	Joren Dom	Antwerp	Beerschot Wilrijk	Free	
7 July 2017	Stefan Dražić	Voždovac	Mechelen	Undisclosed	
7 July 2017	Bruno Godeau	Oostende	Excel Mouscron	Undisclosed	
7 July 2017	Ismail H'Maidat	Roma	Westerlo	Loan	
7 July 2017	Charles Kwateng	Lierse	Mandel United	Loan	
7 July 2017	Randal Oto'o	Braga B	Westerlo	Loan	(Note: Oto'o was already on loan from Braga B to Westerlo during the 2016-17 season. The loan was extended for another season.)
7 July 2017	Jorge Pulido	Sint-Truiden	Huesca	Undisclosed	
7 July 2017	Iebe Swers	Sint-Truiden	Lommel	Loan	
8 July 2017	Panos Armenakas	Udinese	Tubize	Loan	
8 July 2017	Abdel Diarra	Syrianska	Beerschot Wilrijk	Undisclosed	
9 July 2017	Logan Bailly	Celtic	Excel Mouscron	Undisclosed	
9 July 2017	Guillermo Ochoa	Málaga	Standard Liège	Free	
9 July 2017	Ramin Rezaeian	Persepolis	Oostende	Undisclosed	
9 July 2017	Jeffrén Suárez	Eupen	Grasshopper	Undisclosed	
9 July 2017	Florent Zitte	Union SG	Saint-Pierroise	Free	
10 July 2017	Paolino Bertaccini	Genk	Arouca	Undisclosed	(Note: Bertaccini was on loan from Genk to Cercle Brugge during the 2016-17 season. The loan ended and Bertaccini was sold to Arouca.)
10 July 2017	Pylyp Budkivskyi	Shakhtar Donetsk	Kortrijk	Loan	
10 July 2017	Gianlucca Fatecha	Olimpia	Anderlecht	Loan	
10 July 2017	William Troost-Ekong	Gent	Bursaspor	Undisclosed	
11 July 2017	Uche Henry Agbo	Watford	Standard Liège	Undisclosed	
11 July 2017	Mitch Apau	Westerlo	Olimpija Ljubljana	Undisclosed	
11 July 2017	Nico Binst	Antwerp	Lierse	Undisclosed	
11 July 2017	Crysan	Atlético Paranaense	Cercle Brugge	Loan	
11 July 2017	Khaleem Hyland	Westerlo	Al-Faisaly	Free	
11 July 2017	Héctor Rodas	Córdoba	Cercle Brugge	Undisclosed	
11 July 2017	Eduards Višņakovs	Westerlo	RFS	Undisclosed	(Note: Višņakovs was on loan from Westerlo to Ruch Chorzów during the 2016-17 season. The loan ended and Višņakovs was sold to RFS.)
12 July 2017	Liam Bossin	Anderlecht	Nottingham Forest	Undisclosed	
12 July 2017	Wout Faes	Anderlecht	Excelsior	Loan	(Note: Faes was on loan from Anderlecht to Heerenveen during second half of the 2016-17 season. The loan ended but now Faes was loaned to Excelsior.)
12 July 2017	Marcus Ingvartsen	Nordsjælland	Genk	Undisclosed	
12 July 2017	Marin Jakoliš	Roeselare	Admira Wacker	Undisclosed	
12 July 2017	Mathieu Maertens	Cercle Brugge	OH Leuven	Undisclosed	
12 July 2017	Xavier Mercier	Kortrijk	Cercle Brugge	Undisclosed	
12 July 2017	Arne Naudts	Cercle Brugge	Helmond Sport	Undisclosed	
12 July 2017	Lars Veldwijk	Kortrijk	Groningen	Undisclosed	(Note: Veldwijk was on loan from Kortrijk to Aalesund since March 2017. The loan ended and Veldwijk was sold to Groningen.)
13 July 2017	Frank Acheampong	Anderlecht	Tianjin TEDA	Loan	
13 July 2017	Dylan Batubinsika	Paris Saint-Germain Academy	Antwerp	Undisclosed	
13 July 2017	Reda Jaadi	Mechelen	Antwerp	Free	
13 July 2017	Fejsal Mulić	Excel Mouscron	Hapoel Acre	Undisclosed	
13 July 2017	Zotsara Randriambololona	Virton	Antwerp	Undisclosed	
13 July 2017	Moustapha Bayal Sall	Al-Arabi	Antwerp	Undisclosed	
14 July 2017	Akram Afif	Villarreal	Eupen	Loan	
14 July 2017	Wang Bin	Shenyang Urban	Roeselare	Undisclosed	
14 July 2017	Yves De Winter	Roda JC	Roeselare	Undisclosed	
14 July 2017	Wolke Janssens	Sint-Truiden	Lierse	Loan	
14 July 2017	Xu Jiajun	Hebei Fortune	Roeselare	Undisclosed	
14 July 2017	Assim Madibo	Al-Duhail	Eupen	Loan	
14 July 2017	Hamza Sanhaji	Al Sadd	Eupen	Loan	
14 July 2017	Derrick Tshimanga	Willem II	OH Leuven	Free	
15 July 2017	Rúben Fernandes	Sint-Truiden	Portimonense	Undisclosed	
15 July 2017	Jorge Teixeira	Charlton Athletic	Sint-Truiden	Undisclosed	
16 July 2017	Florent Stevance	Charleroi	Tubize	Loan	(Note: Stevance was on loan from Charleroi to Roeselare since the second half of the 2016-17 season. The loan ended and Stevance was now loaned to Tubize.)
17 July 2017	Sinan Bolat	Porto	Antwerp	Undisclosed	
17 July 2017	Idrissa Doumbia	Anderlecht	Zulte Waregem	Loan	
17 July 2017	Marco Ilaimaharitra	Sochaux	Charleroi	Undisclosed	
17 July 2017	Nicolas Orye	Waasland-Beveren	Heist	Loan	(Note: Orye was on loan from Waasland-Beveren to Lommel since the second half of the 2016-17 season. The loan ended and Orye was now loaned to Heist.)
17 July 2017	Gaëtan Robail	Paris Saint-Germain	Cercle Brugge	Loan	
17 July 2017	Birama Touré	Standard Liège	Auxerre	Undisclosed	(Note: Touré was already on loan from Standard to Auxerre since the second half of the 2016-17 season and the deal was now made permanent.)
17 July 2017	Mohamed Yattara	Standard Liège	Auxerre	Undisclosed	(Note: Yattara was already on loan from Standard to Auxerre since the second half of the 2016-17 season and the deal was now made permanent.)
18 July 2017	Irvin Cardona	Monaco	Cercle Brugge	Loan	
18 July 2017	Claudemir	Club Brugge	Al-Ahli	Undisclosed	
18 July 2017	Javier García Guillén	Villarreal B	Cercle Brugge	Undisclosed	
18 July 2017	Jordy Gaspar	Monaco	Cercle Brugge	Loan	
18 July 2017	Deiver Machado	Millonarios	Gent	Undisclosed	
18 July 2017	Riley McGree	Adelaide United	Club Brugge	Undisclosed	
18 July 2017	Ethan Poulain	Charleroi	La Louvière Centre	Loan	
18 July 2017	Ivo Rodrigues	Porto	Antwerp	Loan	
18 July 2017	Senne Van Dooren	Waasland-Beveren	Berchem Sport	Loan	
19 July 2017	Samuel Asamoah	Eupen	Sint-Truiden	Free	
19 July 2017	Cristian Ceballos	Charlton Athletic	Sint-Truiden	Undisclosed	(Note: Ceballos was already on loan from Charlton Athletic to Sint-Truiden during the 2016-17 season and the deal was now made permanent.)
19 July 2017	Dimitri Daeseleire	Antwerp	OH Leuven	Free	
19 July 2017	Thomas Jutten	Cercle Brugge	Dessel Sport	Loan	(Note: Jutten was already on loan from Cercle Brugge to Dessel Sport during the 2016-17 season and the deal was extended with another season.)
19 July 2017	Emir Kujović	Gent	Fortuna Düsseldorf	Free	
19 July 2017	Deivydas Matulevičius	Excel Mouscron	Hibernian	Free	
19 July 2017	Kenny Steppe	Zulte Waregem	Sint-Truiden	Undisclosed	
19 July 2017	Benjamin Tetteh	Standard Liège	Bohemians 1905	Loan	(Note: Tetteh was on loan from Standard to Slovácko during the 2016-17 season. The loan ended and Tetteh was now loaned to Bohemians 1905.)
19 July 2017	Jorn Vancamp	Anderlecht	Roda JC	Loan	
20 July 2017	Panagiotis Kynigopoulos	Sint-Truiden	Panachaiki	Free	(Note: Kynigopoulos was on loan from Sint-Truiden to Iraklis during the 2016-17 season. The loan ended and Kynigopoulos was released to Panachaiki.)
21 July 2017	Jean-Charles Castelletto	Club Brugge	Stade Brest	Undisclosed	(Note: Castelletto was on loan from Club Brugge to Red Star during the 2016-17 season. The loan ended and Castelletto was sold to Stade Brest.)
22 July 2017	Joey Dujardin	Lokeren	Hamme	Free	(Note: Dujardin was already on loan from Lokeren to Hamme during the 2016-17 season. The loan ended, Dujardin and Lokeren agreed to terminate their contract and Dujardin then joined Hamme permanently without transfer fee.)
22 July 2017	Rafael Galhardo	Anderlecht	Cruzeiro	Free	(Note: Galhardo was on loan from Anderlecht to Atlético Paranaense during the 2016-17 season. The loan ended and Galhardo was released to Cruzeiro.)
24 July 2017	Joseph Aidoo	Hammarby	Genk	Undisclosed	
24 July 2017	Djené	Sint-Truiden	Getafe	Undisclosed	
24 July 2017	Samuel Fabris	Cercle Brugge	Virton	Undisclosed	
24 July 2017	Artur Jorge	Braga	Excel Mouscron	Loan	
24 July 2017	Tomislav Kiš	Kortrijk	Shakhtyor Soligorsk	Undisclosed	(Note: Kiš was on loan from Kortrijk to Cercle Brugge during the 2016-17 season. The loan ended and Kiš was sold to Shakhtyor Soligorsk.)
24 July 2017	Sébastien Locigno	Oostende	Excel Mouscron	Undisclosed	(Note: Locigno was on loan from Oostende to Go Ahead Eagles during the 2016-17 season. The loan ended and Locigno was sold to Excel Mouscron.)
25 July 2017	Sergio Ayala	Valencia Mestalla	Sint-Truiden	Undisclosed	
25 July 2017	Djamel Bakar	Charleroi	Tours	Free	
25 July 2017	Mulopo Kudimbana	Antwerp	Union SG	Undisclosed	
25 July 2017	Matheus	Londrina	Antwerp	Undisclosed	
25 July 2017	Fredrik Oldrup Jensen	Odd	Zulte Waregem	Undisclosed	
25 July 2017	Johanna Omolo	Antwerp	Cercle Brugge	Undisclosed	
26 July 2017	Mohamed Aidara	Werder Bremen II	Excel Mouscron	Free	
26 July 2017	Dino Arslanagić	Excel Mouscron	Antwerp	Undisclosed	
26 July 2017	Simon Bracke	OH Leuven	Hasselt	Free	
26 July 2017	Grigoris Kastanos	Juventus	Zulte Waregem	Loan	
26 July 2017	Juan Pablo Torres	Free Agent	Lokeren	NA	
27 July 2017	Sebastiaan Brebels	Zulte Waregem	Lommel	Free	(Note: Brebels was on loan from Zulte Waregem to Cercle Brugge during the 2016-17 season. The loan ended and Brebels was released to Lommel.)
27 July 2017	Nicola Leali	Juventus	Zulte Waregem	Loan	
27 July 2017	Bram Nuytinck	Anderlecht	Udinese	3.000.000 €	
27 July 2017	Obbi Oularé	Watford	Antwerp	Loan	
27 July 2017	Gilles Van Remoortere	Waasland-Beveren	Hamme	Free	
28 July 2017	Victorien Angban	Chelsea	Waasland-Beveren	Loan	
28 July 2017	Thanasis Papazoglou	Kortrijk	Aalesund	Loan	(Note: Papazoglou was on loan from Kortrijk to Roda JC during the second half of the 2016-17 season. The loan ended and Papazoglou was now loaned to Aalesund.)
28 July 2017	Alen Šarić-Hodžić	Mouscron	Zmaj Blato	Undisclosed	
29 July 2017	Valērijs Šabala	Club Brugge	Podbeskidzie Bielsko-Biała	Undisclosed	(Note: Šabala was on loan from Club Brugge to Riga during the second half of the 2016-17 season. The loan ended and Šabala was now sold to Podbeskidzie Bielsko-Biała.)
30 July 2017	Alexandre Alfaiate	Benfica B	Tubize	Undisclosed	
30 July 2017	Mohammed Aoulad	Union SG	Wydad Casablanca	Free	
30 July 2017	Osah Bernardinho	Attram de Visser Soccer Academy	Westerlo	Undisclosed	
30 July 2017	Marc Valiente	Maccabi Haifa	Eupen	Free	
31 July 2017	Taiwo Awoniyi	Liverpool	Excel Mouscron	Loan	
31 July 2017	Dylan Bronn	Chamois Niortais	Gent	Undisclosed	
31 July 2017	Cédric D'Ulivo	OH Leuven	FH	Free	

=== August 2017 ===
Date	Name	Moving from	Moving to	Fee	Note
1 August 2017	Larry Azouni	Nîmes	Kortrijk	Undisclosed	
1 August 2017	Jordan Henri	Tubize	Olympic Charleroi	Free	
1 August 2017	Teddy Mézague	Leyton Orient	Excel Mouscron	Free	
1 August 2017	Evariste Ngolok	Lokeren	Aris Limassol	Free	
1 August 2017	Terry Osei-Berkoe	Club Brugge	Knokke	Loan	
2 August 2017	Yevhen Makarenko	Dynamo Kyiv	Kortrijk	Free	
2 August 2017	Luka Stojanović	Apollon Limassol	Antwerp	Loan	(Note: Stojanović was on loan from Apollon Limassol to Excel Mouscron during the 2016-17 season. The loan ended and Stojanović was now loaned to Antwerp.)
3 August 2017	Nathan de Medina	Anderlecht	Excel Mouscron	Undisclosed	(Note: De Medina was on loan from Anderlecht to OH Leuven during the 2016-17 season. The loan ended and De Medina was now sold to Excel Mouscron.)
3 August 2017	Gilles Dewaele	Cercle Brugge	Westerlo	Undisclosed	
3 August 2017	Jordy Lokando	OH Leuven	Heist	Loan	
3 August 2017	Daisuke Sakai	Oita Trinita	Tubize	Loan	
4 August 2017	Niels Coussement	Cercle Brugge	Knokke	Loan	
4 August 2017	Reno Wilmots	Standard Liège	Roeselare	Free	
5 August 2017	Steve Ryckaert	Sint-Truiden	Tubize	Loan	
6 August 2017	Martin Milec	Standard Liège	Maribor	Undisclosed	(Note: Milec was on loan from Standard Liège to Roda JC during the 2016-17 season. The loan ended and Milec was sold to Maribor.)
7 August 2017	Gary Kagelmacher	Maccabi Haifa	Kortrijk	Undisclosed	
7 August 2017	Yannick Loemba	Oostende	Adana Demirspor	Undisclosed	(Note: Loemba was on loan from Oostende to OH Leuven during the 2016-17 season. The loan ended and Loemba was sold to Adana Demirspor.)
7 August 2017	Tomás Pina	Club Brugge	Alavés	Loan	
7 August 2017	Tino-Sven Sušić	Genk	Maccabi Tel Aviv	Loan	
8 August 2017	Maksym Bah	Excel Mouscron	Virton	Free	(Note: Bah was on loan from Excel Mouscron to Westhoek during the 2016-17 season. The loan ended and Bah was released to Virton.)
8 August 2017	Andrei Camargo	Tubize	Lierse	Free	
8 August 2017	Dylan De Belder	Lierse	Cercle Brugge	Undisclosed	
8 August 2017	Dimitrios Goutas	Olympiacos	Sint-Truiden	Loan	(Note: Goutas was on loan from Olympiacos to Kortrijk during the 2016-17 season. The loan ended and Goutas was now loaned to Sint-Truiden.)
8 August 2017	Nathan Kabasele	Anderlecht	Gazişehir Gaziantep	Undisclosed	(Note: Kabasele was on loan from Anderlecht to Excel Mouscron during the second half of the 2016-17 season. The loan ended and Kabasele was now sold to Gazişehir Gaziantep.)
8 August 2017	Didier Ovono	Oostende	Paris FC	Free	
8 August 2017	Michalis Sifakis	Kortrijk	Samsunspor	Free	
9 August 2017	Christophe Diedhiou	Gazélec Ajaccio	Excel Mouscron	Undisclosed	
9 August 2017	Carlos Strandberg	Club Brugge	Malmö	Undisclosed	(Note: Strandberg was on loan from Club Brugge to Westerlo during the second half of the 2016-17 season. The loan ended and Strandberg was sold to Malmö FF.)
9 August 2017	Jari Vandeputte	Gent	Viterbese	Free	(Note: Vandeputte was on loan from Gent to Eindhoven during the last two seasons. The loan ended and Vandeputte was released to Viterbese.)
10 August 2017	José Izquierdo	Club Brugge	Brighton & Hove Albion	15 to 18 million €	
10 August 2017	Azzeddine Zaidi	Zulte Waregem	ASV Geel	Free	
11 August 2017	Nader Ghandri	Club Africain	Antwerp	Undisclosed	
11 August 2017	Christophe Janssens	Genk	MVV	Loan	
11 August 2017	Laurent Lemoine	Club Brugge	Roeselare	Loan	
11 August 2017	Hugo Vidémont	Wisła Kraków	Tubize	Undisclosed	
12 August 2017	Clinton Mata	Charleroi	Genk	Loan	
12 August 2017	Branislav Niňaj	Lokeren	Osmanlıspor	Loan	
12 August 2017	Marco Weymans	Cardiff City Academy	Tubize	Undisclosed	
13 August 2017	Rami Gershon	Gent	Maccabi Haifa	Undisclosed	
13 August 2017	Mbaye Leye	Zulte Waregem	Eupen	Undisclosed	
13 August 2017	Tony Watt	Charlton Athletic	OH Leuven	Undisclosed	
14 August 2017	Karim Hafez	Lierse	Lens	Loan	(Note: Hafez was already on loan from Lierse to Lens during the 2016-17 season. A new loan deal was set up for one season.)
14 August 2017	Jarno Molenberghs	Westerlo	Oosterzonen Oosterwijk	Free	(Note: Molenberghs was on loan from Westerlo to Lommel since the second half of the 2016-17 season. The loan ended and Molenberghs was released to Oosterzonen Oosterwijk.)
15 August 2017	Badreddine Azzouzi	Tubize	Meux	Undisclosed	
15 August 2017	Mamadou Bagayoko	Sint-Truiden	OH Leuven	Free	
15 August 2017	Cyriac	Oostende	Sivasspor	Undisclosed	(Note: Cyriac was on loan from Oostende to Fulham during the second half of the 2016-17 season. The loan ended and Cyriac was sold to Sivasspor.)
15 August 2017	Jonathan Legear	Standard Liège	Sint-Truiden	Undisclosed	
15 August 2017	Antun Palić	Dinamo București	Excel Mouscron	Free	
16 August 2017	Youcef Attal	Paradou	Kortrijk	Loan	
16 August 2017	Lucas Damblon	Sint-Truiden	RWDM47	Loan	(Note: Damblon was on loan from Sint-Truiden to ASV Geel during the 2016-17 season. The loan ended and Damblon was loaned to RWDM47.)
16 August 2017	Zinho Gano	Waasland-Beveren	Oostende	Undisclosed	
16 August 2017	Roman Yaremchuk	Dynamo Kyiv	Gent	Undisclosed	
17 August 2017	Jeff Callebaut	Mechelen	Pafos	Free	
17 August 2017	Yassine El Ghanassy	Oostende	Nantes	Undisclosed	
17 August 2017	Kalifa Coulibaly	Gent	Nantes	4 million €	
17 August 2017	Hwang Ki-wook	Seoul	Tubize	Loan	
17 August 2017	Robert Mühren	Zulte Waregem	Sparta Rotterdam	Loan	
17 August 2017	Jacob Rinne	Gent	AaB	Undisclosed	
18 August 2017	David Hubert	Gent	OH Leuven	Undisclosed	(Note: Hubert was on loan from Gent to Excel Mouscron since the 2015-16 season. The loan ended and Hubert was sold to OH Leuven.)
18 August 2017	Elliott Moore	Leicester City Reserves	OH Leuven	Loan	
18 August 2017	Jelle Van Damme	LA Galaxy	Antwerp	200.000 €	
19 August 2017	Héritier Luvumbu	Vita Club	Union SG	Loan	
19 August 2017	Marko Poletanović	Gent	Tosno	Free	(Note: Poletanović was on loan from Gent to Red Star Belgrade during the 2016-17 season. The loan ended and Poletanović was released to Tosno.)
21 August 2017	Carlinhos	Estoril	Standard Liège	Undisclosed	
21 August 2017	Saulo Decarli	Eintracht Braunschweig	Club Brugge	Undisclosed	
21 August 2017	Jakov Filipović	Inter Zaprešić	Lokeren	Undisclosed	
21 August 2017	Jérémy Taravel	Gent	Cercle Brugge	Free	(Note: Taravel was on loan from Gent to Sion during the second half of the 2016-17 season. The loan ended and Taravel was released to Cercle Brugge.)
21 August 2017	Lou Wallaert	Union SG	Rebecq	Undisclosed	
22 August 2017	Davy Roef	Anderlecht	Waasland-Beveren	Loan	(Note: Roef was on loan from Anderlecht to Deportivo La Coruña during the second half of the 2016-17 season. The loan ended and Roef was now loaned to Waasland-Beveren.)
23 August 2017	Christophe Bertjens	Westerlo	Union SG	Undisclosed	
23 August 2017	Bryan Van Den Bogaert	Ebbsfleet United	Westerlo	Free	
23 August 2017	Jannes Vansteenkiste	Antwerp	Roda JC	Undisclosed	
24 August 2017	Boy de Jong	Telstar	Anderlecht	Undisclosed	
24 August 2017	Simon Diedhiou	Gent	OH Leuven	Undisclosed	(Note: Diedhiou was on loan from Excel Mouscron to Gent during the 2016-17 season. The loan ended and Diedhiou was now sold to OH Leuven.)
24 August 2017	Dylan Seys	Club Brugge	Waalwijk	Undisclosed	(Note: Seys was on loan from Club Brugge to Twente during the 2016-17 season. The loan ended and Seys was now sold to Waalwijk.)
25 August 2017	Giorgi Chakvetadze	Dinamo Tbilisi	Gent	Undisclosed	
26 August 2017	Aleksandar Bjelica	Mechelen	Oostende	Undisclosed	
28 August 2017	Joaquín Ardaiz	El Tanque Sisley	Antwerp	Loan	
28 August 2017	Din Sula	OH Leuven	Lommel	Loan	
28 August 2017	Mile Svilar	Anderlecht	Benfica	2.000.000 €	
28 August 2017	Kafoumba Touré	Qadsia	Antwerp	Undisclosed	
29 August 2017	Diego Capel	Anderlecht	Free Agent	Released	
29 August 2017	Noë Dussenne	Crotone	Gent	Loan	
29 August 2017	Christian Osaguona	Mechelen	Westerlo	Free	
30 August 2017	Benjamin Bambi	OH Leuven	Heist	Loan	
30 August 2017	Robert Berić	Saint-Étienne	Anderlecht	Loan	
30 August 2017	Jordy Clasie	Southampton	Club Brugge	Loan	
30 August 2017	Silvère Ganvoula	Anderlecht	Mechelen	Loan	(Note: Ganvoula was on loan from Anderlecht to Westerlo during the second half of the 2016-17 season. The loan ended and Ganvoula was now loaned to Mechelen.)
30 August 2017	Ryan Mmaee	Standard Liège	Waasland-Beveren	Loan	
30 August 2017	Aleksandar Šofranac	Rijeka	Cercle Brugge	Undisclosed	
30 August 2017	Ricardo van Rhijn	Club Brugge	AZ	Loan	
30 August 2017	Senne Vits	Standard Liège	Hasselt	Free	(Note: Vits was on loan from Standard to MVV during the second half of the 2016-17 season. The loan ended and Vits was released to Hasselt.)
30 August 2017	Zizo	Lierse	Moreirense	Undisclosed	(Note: Zizo was on loan from Lierse to Nacional during the second half of the 2016-17 season. The loan ended and Zizo was now sold to Moreirense.)
31 August 2017	Elton Acolatse	Club Brugge	Sint-Truiden	Loan	
31 August 2017	Carlens Arcus	Cercle Brugge	Auxerre	Loan	
31 August 2017	Yady Bangoura	Union SG	Eendracht Aalst	Loan	
31 August 2017	Ishak Belfodil	Standard Liège	Werder Bremen	Loan	
31 August 2017	Maxime Biset	Antwerp	Westerlo	Undisclosed	
31 August 2017	Benjamin Boulenger	Charleroi	OH Leuven	Loan	
31 August 2017	Frank Boya	1860 Munich	Excel Mouscron	Undisclosed	
31 August 2017	Aurélio Buta	Benfica	Antwerp	Loan	
31 August 2017	Fabien Camus	Antwerp	Free Agent	Released	
31 August 2017	Maxence Carlier	Lens	Tubize	Loan	
31 August 2017	Luis Pedro Cavanda	Galatasaray	Standard Liège	Loan	
31 August 2017	Agustín Cedrés	Excel Mouscron	Apollon Limassol	Free	
31 August 2017	Alessandro Cerigioni	Waasland-Beveren	Roeselare	Loan	
31 August 2017	Duje Čop	Cagliari	Standard Liège	Undisclosed	
31 August 2017	Hugo Cuypers	Standard Liège	Ergotelis	Undisclosed	(Note: Cuypers was on loan from Standard to Seraing during the 2016-17 season. The loan ended and Cuypers was now sold to Ergotelis.)
31 August 2017	Tuur Dierckx	Antwerp	Waasland-Beveren	Undisclosed	
31 August 2017	Mathieu Dossevi	Standard Liège	Metz	Loan	
31 August 2017	Frédéric Duplus	Antwerp	Lens	Undisclosed	
31 August 2017	Björn Engels	Club Brugge	Olympiacos	Undisclosed	
31 August 2017	Emmanuel Imorou	Caen	Cercle Brugge	Undisclosed	
31 August 2017	Lior Inebrum	Gent	Maribor	Loan	
31 August 2017	Isaac Kiese Thelin	Anderlecht	Waasland-Beveren	Loan	
31 August 2017	Isaac Koné	Antwerp	Cercle Brugge	Undisclosed	
31 August 2017	Dylan Lambrecth	Anderlecht	Union SG	Loan	(Note: Lambrecth was on loan from Anderlecht to Roeselare during the second half of the 2016-17 season. The loan ended and Lambrecth was now loaned to Union SG.)
31 August 2017	Yusuf Lawal	36 Lions	Lokeren	Undisclosed	
31 August 2017	Joyce Lomalisa	Vita Club	Excel Mouscron	Loan	
31 August 2017	Dario Melnjak	Lokeren	Domžale	Undisclosed	(Note: Melnjak was on loan from Lokeren to Slaven Belupo during the 2016-17 season. The loan ended and Melnjak was now sold to Domžale.)
31 August 2017	Julian Michel	Waasland-Beveren	Lokeren	Undisclosed	
31 August 2017	Freddy Mombongo-Dues	Union SG	RFC Liège	Loan	
31 August 2017	Leo Njengo	OH Leuven	Dessel Sport	Loan	
31 August 2017	Godwin Odibo	Nath Boys Academy	OH Leuven	Undisclosed	
31 August 2017	Jérémy Perbet	Club Brugge	Kortrijk	Loan	
31 August 2017	Koen Persoons	Lokeren	OH Leuven	Undisclosed	
31 August 2017	Silvio Proto	Oostende	Olympiacos	Undisclosed	
31 August 2017	Benito Raman	Standard Liège	Fortuna Düsseldorf	Loan	
31 August 2017	Roberto	Atlético Madrid B	Antwerp	Free	
31 August 2017	Dorin Rotariu	Club Brugge	Excel Mouscron	Loan	
31 August 2017	Vlad Rusu	Beerschot Wilrijk	Luceafărul Oradea	Free	
31 August 2017	Josué Sá	Vitória Guimarães	Anderlecht	Undisclosed	
31 August 2017	Luciano Slagveer	Lokeren	Twente	Loan	
31 August 2017	Ivan Tomečak	Al-Nassr	Mechelen	Undisclosed	
31 August 2017	Mike Vanhamel	Lierse	Oostende	Undisclosed	
31 August 2017	Sandro Wieser	Reading	Roeselare	Loan	
31 August 2017	Sambou Yatabaré	Werder Bremen	Antwerp	Loan	

=== September 2017 ===
Date	Name	Moving from	Moving to	Fee	Note
1 September 2017	Copa	Lokeren	OH Leuven	Free	
1 September 2017	Andy Faustin	Valenciennes	Zulte Waregem	Undisclosed	
1 September 2017	José Manuel García Naranjo	Genk	Leganés	Loan	
1 September 2017	Yassine Salah	Union SG	Sint-Truiden	Loan	
1 September 2017	Karel Van Roose	Cercle Brugge	Torhout	Loan	(Note: Van Roose was on loan from Cercle Brugge to Oosterzonen Oosterwijk during second half of the 2016-17 season. The loan ended and Van Roose was now loaned to Torhout.)

== Sorted by team ==
=== Belgian First Division A teams ===
==== Anderlecht ====
In:

No.	Pos.	Nation	Player
—	FW	SLO	Robert Berić (on loan from Saint-Étienne)
—	MF	BEL	Massimo Bruno (again on loan from RB Leipzig)
—	GK	NED	Boy de Jong (from Telstar)
—	MF	PAR	Gianlucca Fatecha (on loan from Olimpia)
—	MF	BEL	Pieter Gerkens (from Sint-Truiden)
—	FW	TUN	Hamdi Harbaoui (loan return from Charleroi)
—	MF	BEL	Sven Kums (from Watford)
—	FW	NGR	Henry Onyekuru (on loan from Everton)
—	DF	POR	Josué Sá (from Vitória Guimarães)
—	GK	BEL	Matz Sels (on loan from Newcastle United)
—	DF	SRB	Uroš Spajić (was on loan from Toulouse, now bought)
—	FW	POL	Łukasz Teodorczyk (was on loan from Dynamo Kyiv, now bought)

Out:

No.	Pos.	Nation	Player
1	GK	ESP	Rubén Martínez (loan return to Deportivo La Coruña)
8	MF	SEN	Stéphane Badji (on loan to Kayserispor)
14	DF	NED	Bram Nuytinck (to Udinese)
18	FW	GHA	Frank Acheampong (on loan to Tianjin TEDA)
22	DF	CIV	Idrissa Doumbia (on loan to Zulte Waregem)
31	MF	BEL	Youri Tielemans (to Monaco)
49	FW	BEL	Jorn Vancamp (on loan to Roda JC)
—	GK	IRL	Liam Bossin (to Nottingham Forest)
—	MF	ESP	Diego Capel (released)
—	DF	ITA	Sebastian De Maio (was on loan to Fiorentina, now sold to Bologna)
—	DF	BEL	Nathan de Medina (was on loan to OH Leuven, now sold to Excel Mouscron)
—	DF	BEL	Wout Faes (was on loan to Heerenveen, now loaned to Excelsior)
—	DF	BRA	Rafael Galhardo (was on loan to Atlético Paranaense, now released to Cruzeiro)
—	FW	CGO	Silvère Ganvoula (was on loan to Westerlo, now loaned to Mechelen)
—	DF	BEL	Michaël Heylen (was on loan to Westerlo, now sold to Zulte Waregem)
—	FW	BEL	Nathan Kabasele (was on loan to Excel Mouscron, now sold to Gazişehir Gaziantep)
—	MF	BEL	Andy Kawaya (was on loan to Willem II, now sold to Mechelen)
—	FW	BEL	Dylan Lambrecth (was on loan to Roeselare, now loaned to Union SG)
—	FW	BEL	Aaron Leya Iseka (was on loan to Marseille, now loaned to Zulte Waregem)
—	MF	COD	Dodi Lukebakio (was on loan to Toulouse, now loaned to Charleroi)
—	MF	BEL	Orel Mangala (was on loan to Borussia Dortmund, now sold to VfB Stuttgart)
—	DF	BEL	Hervé Matthys (was on loan to Westerlo, now sold to Eindhoven)
—	MF	COD	Fabrice N'Sakala (was on loan to Alanyaspor, now sold)
—	GK	BEL	Davy Roef (was on loan to Deportivo La Coruña, now loaned to Waasland-Beveren)
—	GK	BEL	Mile Svilar (to Benfica)
—	FW	SWE	Isaac Kiese Thelin (again on loan from Bordeaux, then loaned to Waasland-Beveren)
—	MF	EGY	Trezeguet (was on loan to Excel Mouscron, now loaned to Kasımpaşa)

==== Antwerp ====
In:

No.	Pos.	Nation	Player
—	FW	URU	Joaquín Ardaiz (on loan from El Tanque Sisley)
—	DF	BEL	Dino Arslanagić (from Excel Mouscron)
—	DF	FRA	Dylan Batubinsika (from Paris Saint-Germain Academy)
—	GK	TUR	Sinan Bolat (from Porto)
—	DF	POR	Aurélio Buta (on loan from Benfica)
—	DF	BEL	Alexander Corryn (again on loan from Mechelen)
—	MF	TUN	Nader Ghandri (from Club Africain)
—	MF	BEL	Reda Jaadi (from Mechelen)
—	DF	BRA	Matheus (from Londrina)
—	FW	BEL	Obbi Oularé (on loan from Watford)
—	MF	MAD	Zotsara Randriambololona (from Virton)
—	FW	ESP	Roberto (from Atlético Madrid B)
—	MF	POR	Ivo Rodrigues (on loan from Porto)
—	DF	SEN	Moustapha Bayal Sall (from Al-Arabi)
—	MF	SRB	Luka Stojanović (on loan from Apollon Limassol)
—	FW	MLI	Kafoumba Touré (from Qadsia)
—	DF	BEL	Jelle Van Damme (from LA Galaxy)
—	FW	MLI	Sambou Yatabaré (on loan from Werder Bremen)

Out:

No.	Pos.	Nation	Player
1	GK	COD	Mulopo Kudimbana (to Union SG)
2	DF	BEL	Dimitri Daeseleire (to OH Leuven)
3	DF	BEL	Maxime Biset (to Westerlo)
5	MF	BEL	Jannes Vansteenkiste (to Roda JC)
6	MF	CIV	Isaac Koné (to Cercle Brugge)
8	DF	BEL	Joren Dom (to Beerschot Wilrijk)
12	GK	BEL	Jordy Huysmans (to Berchem Sport)
15	MF	KEN	Johanna Omolo (to Cercle Brugge)
21	FW	BEL	Michaël Lallemand (loan return to Kortrijk)
23	FW	BEL	Nico Binst (to Lierse)
27	DF	FRA	Frédéric Duplus (to Lens)
28	MF	TUN	Djaïd Kasri (released)
40	FW	BEL	Stephen Buyl (loan return to Zulte Waregem)
55	FW	BEL	Tuur Dierckx (to Waasland-Beveren)
—	MF	TUN	Fabien Camus (released)
—	DF	BEL	Michiel Jaeken (was on loan to Deinze, now sold to Westerlo)

==== Charleroi ====
In:

No.	Pos.	Nation	Player
—	DF	ANG	Núrio Fortuna (from Braga)
—	MF	FRA	Marco Ilaimaharitra (from Sochaux)
—	MF	COD	Dodi Lukebakio (on loan from Anderlecht)
—	FW	IRI	Kaveh Rezaei (from Esteghlal)

Out:

No.	Pos.	Nation	Player
4	DF	BEL	Ethan Poulain (on loan to La Louvière Centre)
5	DF	FRA	Benjamin Boulenger (on loan to OH Leuven)
9	FW	TUN	Hamdi Harbaoui (loan return to Anderlecht)
19	MF	ANG	Clinton Mata (on loan to Genk)
21	FW	COM	Djamel Bakar (to Tours)
25	MF	FRA	Damien Marcq (to Gent)
—	FW	BEL	Roman Ferber (was on loan to Excel Mouscron, now sold to Union SG)
—	GK	BEL	Clément Libertiaux (to Excel Mouscron)
—	FW	FRA	Florent Stevance (was on loan to Roeselare, now loaned to Tubize)

==== Club Brugge ====
In:

No.	Pos.	Nation	Player
—	MF	NED	Jordy Clasie (on loan from Southampton)
—	DF	SUI	Saulo Decarli (from Eintracht Braunschweig)
—	FW	NGR	Emmanuel Bonaventure Dennis (from Zorya Luhansk)
—	GK	BEL	Guillaume Hubert (from Standard Liège)
—	DF	SRB	Erhan Mašović (from Čukarički)
—	MF	AUS	Riley McGree (from Adelaide United)
—	DF	BEL	Brandon Mechele (loan return from Sint-Truiden)
—	DF	COL	Germán Mera (from Deportivo Cali)
—	MF	ZIM	Marvelous Nakamba (from Vitesse)
—	DF	BEL	Jordi Vanlerberghe (from Mechelen)

Out:

No.	Pos.	Nation	Player
2	DF	NED	Ricardo van Rhijn (on loan to AZ)
4	DF	BEL	Björn Engels (to Olympiacos)
6	MF	BRA	Claudemir (to Al-Ahli)
14	FW	CRO	Fran Brodić (on loan to Roeselare)
15	MF	ESP	Tomás Pina (on loan to Alavés)
17	FW	NED	Lex Immers (to ADO)
22	MF	COL	José Izquierdo (to Brighton & Hove Albion)
29	MF	ROU	Dorin Rotariu (on loan to Excel Mouscron)
—	FW	NED	Elton Acolatse (signed from Westerlo, then loaned to Sint-Truiden)
—	DF	BEL	Boli Bolingoli-Mbombo (was on loan to Sint-Truiden, now sold to Rapid Wien)
—	GK	BEL	Sébastien Bruzzese (was on loan to Sint-Truiden, now sold to Kortrijk)
—	DF	FRA	Jean-Charles Castelletto (was on loan to Red Star, now sold to Stade Brest)
—	MF	BEL	Sander Coopman (again on loan to Zulte Waregem)
—	MF	AUS	Bernie Ibini-Isei (was on loan to Sydney, now sold to Vancouver Whitecaps)
—	DF	BEL	Laurent Lemoine (on loan to Roeselare)
—	MF	BEL	Terry Osei-Berkoe (on loan to Knokke)
—	FW	FRA	Jérémy Perbet (signed from Gent, then loaned to Kortrijk)
—	FW	LAT	Valērijs Šabala (was on loan to Riga, now sold to Podbeskidzie Bielsko-Biała)
—	DF	BEL	Jur Schryvers (to Waasland-Beveren)
—	MF	BEL	Dylan Seys (was on loan to Twente, now sold to Waalwijk)
—	MF	BEL	Nikola Storm (again on loan to OH Leuven)
—	FW	SWE	Carlos Strandberg (was on loan to Westerlo, now sold to Malmö)
—	MF	BEL	Jellert Van Landschoot (on loan to Eindhoven)
—	FW	BEL	Dennis Van Vaerenbergh (on loan to Eindhoven)

==== Eupen ====
In:

No.	Pos.	Nation	Player
—	MF	QAT	Akram Afif (on loan from Villarreal)
—	GK	SEN	Souleymane Aw (from Aspire Academy)
—	DF	SEN	Diawandou Diagne (was on loan from Barcelona B, now bought)
—	FW	SEN	Moussa Diallo (from Union La Calamine)
—	DF	QAT	Abdelkarim Hassan (on loan from Al Sadd)
—	FW	SEN	Mbaye Leye (from Zulte Waregem)
—	DF	FRA	Jordan Lotiès (from Dijon)
—	MF	QAT	Assim Madibo (on loan from Al-Duhail)
—	DF	GHA	Abdul Manaf Nurudeen (from Aspire Academy)
—	DF	CRC	Carlos Martínez (from Aspire Academy)
—	FW	MAR	Hamza Sanhaji (on loan from Al Sadd)
—	MF	BEL	Nils Schouterden (from Mechelen)
—	DF	BEL	Mickaël Tirpan (from Excel Mouscron)
—	DF	ESP	Marc Valiente (from Maccabi Haifa)
—	FW	FRA	Nicolas Verdier (from Mechelen)

Out:

No.	Pos.	Nation	Player
3	DF	QAT	Fahad Al-Abdulrahman (loan return to Al Sadd)
6	DF	CMR	Raoul Kenne (released)
7	MF	FRA	Jean-Luc Dompé (loan return to Standard Liège)
9	FW	VEN	Jeffrén Suárez (to Grasshopper)
11	MF	NGR	Anthony Bassey (released)
17	DF	RSA	Phakamani Mngadi (released)
18	MF	BEL	Guy Dufour (to Roeselare)
20	FW	SEN	Mamadou Sylla (loan return to Espanyol)
21	FW	NGR	Henry Onyekuru (to Everton)
23	DF	MLI	Abdoulaye Sanogo (released)
27	DF	RSA	Ntuthuko Radebe (end of contract)
42	DF	GER	Peter Hackenberg (released)
77	GK	BEL	Joseph Biersard (to Hamoir)
91	MF	ESP	José María Cases (end of contract)
92	DF	BEL	Nicolas Timmermans (to RWDM47)
—	MF	GHA	Samuel Asamoah (to Sint-Truiden)
—	MF	BEL	Christian Brüls (released)

==== Excel Mouscron ====
In:

No.	Pos.	Nation	Player
—	MF	SEN	Mohamed Aidara (from Werder Bremen II)
—	MF	BEL	Selim Amallah (from Tubize)
—	FW	NGR	Taiwo Awoniyi (on loan from Liverpool)
—	GK	BEL	Logan Bailly (from Celtic)
—	FW	COD	Jonathan Bolingi (on loan from Standard Liège)
—	MF	CMR	Frank Boya (from 1860 Munich)
—	GK	FRA	Jean Butez (on loan from Lille)
—	DF	BEL	Nathan de Medina (from Anderlecht)
—	DF	SEN	Christophe Diedhiou (from Gazélec Ajaccio)
—	DF	BEL	Bruno Godeau (from Oostende)
—	MF	MEX	Omar Govea (on loan from Porto)
—	GK	BEL	Clément Libertiaux (from Charleroi)
—	DF	BEL	Sébastien Locigno (from Oostende)
—	DF	COD	Joyce Lomalisa (on loan from Vita Club)
—	FW	BEL	Yannis Mbombo (from Örebro)
—	DF	FRA	Teddy Mézague (from Leyton Orient)
—	MF	CRO	Antun Palić (from Dinamo București)
—	MF	ROU	Dorin Rotariu (on loan from Club Brugge)
—	GK	BRA	Vagner (loan return from Boavista)

Out:

No.	Pos.	Nation	Player
4	DF	MAR	Karim Essikal (loan return to Zulte Waregem)
5	MF	BEL	David Hubert (loan return to Gent)
6	MF	ROU	Cristian Manea (loan return to Apollon Limassol)
7	MF	SRB	Filip Marković (released)
9	FW	BEL	Roman Ferber (loan return to Charleroi)
10	MF	EGY	Trezeguet (loan return to Anderlecht)
18	MF	UGA	Farouk Miya (loan return to Standard Liège)
20	FW	SEN	Simon Diedhiou (loan return to Gent)
21	GK	CRO	Matej Delač (loan return to Chelsea)
22	MF	SRB	Luka Stojanović (loan return to Apollon Limassol)
23	DF	BEL	Mickaël Tirpan (to Eupen)
24	DF	SRB	Nikola Gulan (released)
29	DF	FRA	Thibault Peyre (to Union SG)
33	GK	BEL	Théo Defourny (to Tubize)
34	DF	CZE	Stefan Simić (loan return to Milan)
36	DF	BEL	Dino Arslanagić (to Antwerp)
45	FW	SRB	Fejsal Mulić (to Hapoel Acre)
66	GK	CRO	Alen Šarić-Hodžić (to Zmaj Blato)
94	FW	BEL	Nathan Kabasele (loan return to Anderlecht)
—	FW	BEL	Maksym Bah (was on loan to Westhoek, now released to Virton)
—	MF	URU	Agustín Cedrés (to Apollon Limassol)
—	MF	TUR	Muhammed Demirci (was on loan to İstanbulspor, now sold)
—	DF	BIH	Daniel Graovac (was on loan to Zrinjski Mostar, now loaned to Željezničar)
—	DF	POR	Artur Jorge (loan deal from Braga terminated)
—	MF	BEL	Corentin Kocur (was on loan to Westhoek, now sold to Fola Esch)
—	FW	LTU	Deivydas Matulevičius (to Hibernian)
—	DF	BEL	Logan Ndembe (to Oostende)

==== Genk ====
In:

No.	Pos.	Nation	Player
—	DF	GHA	Joseph Aidoo (from Hammarby)
—	MF	BEL	Manuel Benson (from Lierse)
—	MF	BEL	Yoni Buyens (loan return from Westerlo)
—	FW	DEN	Marcus Ingvartsen (from Nordsjælland)
—	GK	HUN	László Köteles (loan return from Waasland-Beveren)
—	DF	DEN	Joakim Mæhle (from AaB)
—	MF	UKR	Ruslan Malinovskyi (was on loan from Shakhtar Donetsk, now bought)
—	MF	ANG	Clinton Mata (on loan from Charleroi)
—	GK	AUS	Danny Vukovic (from Sydney)

Out:

No.	Pos.	Nation	Player
1	GK	NED	Marco Bizot (to AZ)
5	DF	NED	Sandy Walsh (to Zulte Waregem)
8	MF	GHA	Bennard Kumordzi (to Kortrijk)
9	FW	NED	Jean-Paul Boëtius (loan return to Basel)
10	FW	BIH	Tino-Sven Sušić (on loan to Maccabi Tel Aviv)
11	FW	ESP	José Manuel García Naranjo (on loan to Leganés)
26	GK	AUS	Mathew Ryan (loan return to Valencia)
32	DF	BEL	Christophe Janssens (on loan to MVV)
41	DF	BEL	Timothy Castagne (to Atalanta)
—	FW	BEL	Paolino Bertaccini (was on loan to Cercle Brugge, now sold to Arouca)
—	GK	BEL	Marten Schevenels (to Sint-Truiden)
—	MF	BEL	Laurens Vermijl (to Lommel)

==== Gent ====
In:

No.	Pos.	Nation	Player
—	MF	CRO	Franko Andrijašević (from Rijeka)
—	MF	PAN	Ricardo Ávila (from Chorrillo)
—	DF	TUN	Dylan Bronn (from Chamois Niortais)
—	MF	GEO	Giorgi Chakvetadze (from Dinamo Tbilisi)
—	MF	BEL	Boubakar Diallo (loan return from KRC Gent)
—	DF	BEL	Noë Dussenne (on loan from Crotone)
—	DF	BEL	Siebe Horemans (loan return from OH Leuven)
—	MF	BEL	Aboubakary Koita (from ASV Geel)
—	FW	ZAM	Rodgers Kola (loan return from Hapoel Ra'anana)
—	MF	COL	Deiver Machado (from Millonarios)
—	MF	FRA	Damien Marcq (from Charleroi)
—	MF	BEL	Lucas Schoofs (loan return from OH Leuven)
—	FW	SEN	Mamadou Sylla (from Espanyol)
—	FW	UKR	Roman Yaremchuk (from Dynamo Kyiv)

Out:

No.	Pos.	Nation	Player
1	GK	SWE	Jacob Rinne (to AaB)
4	DF	NGR	William Troost-Ekong (to Bursaspor)
7	FW	MLI	Kalifa Coulibaly (to Nantes)
11	FW	SWE	Emir Kujović (to Fortuna Düsseldorf)
16	MF	BEL	Rob Schoofs (to Mechelen)
24	FW	FRA	Jérémy Perbet (to Club Brugge)
25	GK	BEL	Brian Vandenbussche (to Cercle Brugge)
40	MF	NGR	Rabiu Ibrahim (to Slovan Bratislava)
55	DF	ISR	Rami Gershon (to Maccabi Haifa)
—	DF	ISR	Hatem Abd Elhamed (was on loan to Ashdod, now sold)
—	DF	ISR	Ofir Davidzada (on loan to Maccabi Tel Aviv)
—	FW	SEN	Simon Diedhiou (was on loan to Excel Mouscron, now sold to OH Leuven)
—	MF	ISR	Lior Inebrum (signed from Ashdod, then loaned to Maribor)
—	FW	NGR	Peter Olayinka (was on loan to Dukla Prague, now loaned to Zulte Waregem)
—	MF	SRB	Marko Poletanović (was on loan to Red Star Belgrade, now released to Tosno)
—	FW	CMR	Serge Tabekou (was on loan to OH Leuven, now sold to Union SG)
—	DF	FRA	Jérémy Taravel (was on loan to Sion, now released to Cercle Brugge)
—	MF	BEL	Jari Vandeputte (was on loan to Eindhoven, now released to Viterbese)
—	MF	NOR	Gustav Wikheim (was on loan to Midtjylland, now sold)

==== Kortrijk ====
In:

No.	Pos.	Nation	Player
—	MF	NGR	Abdul Jeleel Ajagun (from Panathinaikos)
—	DF	ALG	Youcef Attal (on loan from Paradou)
—	MF	TUN	Larry Azouni (from Nîmes)
—	GK	BEL	Sébastien Bruzzese (from Club Brugge)
—	FW	UKR	Pylyp Budkivskyi (on loan from Shakhtar Donetsk)
—	DF	URU	Gary Kagelmacher (from Maccabi Haifa)
—	MF	GHA	Bennard Kumordzi (from Genk)
—	FW	BEL	Michaël Lallemand (loan return from Antwerp)
—	GK	BEL	Gilles Lentz (loan return from Cercle Brugge)
—	MF	BEL	Christophe Lepoint (from Zulte Waregem)
—	DF	UKR	Yevhen Makarenko (from Dynamo Kyiv)
—	FW	FRA	Jérémy Perbet (on loan from Club Brugge)
—	MF	BEL	Lukas Van Eenoo (loan return from Roeselare)
—	DF	BEL	Bryan Verboom (on loan from Zulte Waregem)

Out:

No.	Pos.	Nation	Player
6	DF	GRE	Dimitrios Goutas (loan return to Olympiacos)
8	MF	SRB	Nebojša Pavlović (retired)
11	FW	ALG	Idriss Saadi (loan return to Cardiff City)
13	GK	GRE	Michalis Sifakis (to Samsunspor)
17	MF	BEL	Gertjan De Mets (to Zulte Waregem)
23	DF	POR	Joãozinho (to Tondela)
25	MF	FRA	Xavier Mercier (to Cercle Brugge)
29	MF	UKR	Andriy Totovytskyi (loan return to Shakhtar Donetsk)
39	FW	RSA	Lars Veldwijk (was on loan to Aalesund, now sold to Groningen)
88	MF	SEN	Sidy Sarr (on loan to Châteauroux)
—	FW	CRO	Tomislav Kiš (was on loan to Cercle Brugge, now sold to Shakhtyor Soligorsk)
—	FW	GRE	Thanasis Papazoglou (was on loan to Roda JC, now loaned to Aalesund)

==== Lokeren ====
In:

No.	Pos.	Nation	Player
—	DF	CRO	Jakov Filipović (from Inter Zaprešić)
—	GK	BEL	Bo Geens (loan return from MVV)
—	MF	FRA	Samy Kehli (from Roeselare)
—	FW	NGR	Yusuf Lawal (from 36 Lions)
—	DF	BEL	Stefano Marzo (from Heerenveen)
—	MF	FRA	Julian Michel (from Waasland-Beveren)
—	DF	BEL	Tracy Mpati (from Union SG)
—	FW	SWE	Robin Söder (from Esbjerg)
—	MF	USA	Juan Pablo Torres (free agent)

Out:

No.	Pos.	Nation	Player
1	GK	CIV	Copa (to OH Leuven)
8	MF	BEL	Koen Persoons (to OH Leuven)
10	MF	RSA	Ayanda Patosi (to Cape Town City)
11	DF	GRE	Georgios Galitsios (end of contract)
23	MF	CRO	Nikola Jambor (to Osijek)
24	DF	BEL	Ridwan Gyselinck (to Eendracht Aalst)
25	DF	SVK	Branislav Niňaj (on loan to Osmanlıspor)
28	MF	CMR	Evariste Ngolok (to Aris Limassol)
31	MF	BEL	Robbie Ringoet (to Wetteren)
50	MF	UKR	Serhiy Bolbat (loan return to Shakhtar Donetsk)
—	DF	BEL	Joey Dujardin (was on loan to Hamme, now sold)
—	DF	CRO	Dario Melnjak (was on loan to Slaven Belupo, now sold to Domžale)
—	DF	NED	Luciano Slagveer (signed from Heerenveen, then loaned to Twente)

==== Mechelen ====
In:

No.	Pos.	Nation	Player
—	FW	BFA	Hassane Bandé (from Salitas)
—	FW	SRB	Stefan Dražić (from Voždovac)
—	DF	MAR	Ahmed El Messaoudi (was on loan from Lierse, now bought)
—	FW	CGO	Silvère Ganvoula (on loan from Anderlecht)
—	MF	BEL	Andy Kawaya (from Anderlecht)
—	MF	GRE	Dimitris Kolovos (was on loan from Olympiacos, now bought)
—	MF	BEL	Cedric Mingiedi (loan return from Hamme)
—	FW	DEN	Nicklas Pedersen (from Oostende)
—	DF	MAR	Faycal Rherras (from Heart of Midlothian)
—	MF	BEL	Rob Schoofs (from Gent)
—	DF	CRO	Ivan Tomečak (from Al-Nassr)

Out:

No.	Pos.	Nation	Player
12	FW	NGR	Christian Osaguona (to Westerlo)
14	DF	TPE	Xavier Chen (end of contract)
16	DF	BEL	Aleksandar Bjelica (to Oostende)
18	MF	BEL	Nils Schouterden (to Eupen)
27	FW	BEL	Jordy Peffer (on loan to Westerlo)
30	DF	BEL	Jordi Vanlerberghe (to Club Brugge)
33	DF	BEL	Jeff Callebaut (to Pafos)
99	FW	FRA	Nicolas Verdier (to Eupen)
—	DF	BEL	Alexander Corryn (again on loan to Antwerp)
—	MF	BEL	Reda Jaadi (to Antwerp)
—	MF	BEL	Keres Masangu (to Roma)
—	FW	BEL	Jens Naessens (was on loan to Zulte Waregem, now released to Westerlo)

==== Oostende ====
In:

No.	Pos.	Nation	Player
—	FW	BEL	Ibrahima Bah (from Standard Liège)
—	MF	ZAM	Emmanuel Banda (from Esmoriz)
—	DF	BEL	Aleksandar Bjelica (from Mechelen)
—	GK	BEL	Thomas De Bie (from Cercle Brugge)
—	FW	BEL	Zinho Gano (from Waasland-Beveren)
—	DF	BEL	Nicolas Lombaerts (from Zenit Saint Petersburg)
—	DF	BEL	Logan Ndembe (from Excel Mouscron)
—	FW	SLO	Nicolas Rajsel (from Union SG)
—	DF	IRI	Ramin Rezaeian (from Persepolis)
—	GK	BEL	Mike Vanhamel (from Lierse)
—	FW	NED	Richairo Zivkovic (from Ajax)

Out:

No.	Pos.	Nation	Player
1	GK	BEL	Silvio Proto (to Olympiacos)
4	DF	FRA	Fabien Antunes (to Sint-Truiden)
8	MF	BEL	Yassine El Ghanassy (to Nantes)
12	GK	GAB	Didier Ovono (to Paris FC)
14	FW	DEN	Nicklas Pedersen (to Mechelen)
16	MF	MNE	Adam Marušić (to Lazio)
19	FW	BEL	Landry Dimata (to VfL Wolfsburg)
30	GK	FRA	Jean Chopin (to Union Titus Pétange)
31	DF	BEL	Bruno Godeau (to Excel Mouscron)
40	GK	BEL	Justin Verlinden (to Knokke)
—	FW	CIV	Cyriac (was on loan to Fulham, now sold to Sivasspor)
—	FW	FRA	Nicolas de Préville (was on loan to Lille, now sold)
—	DF	BEL	Sébastien Locigno (was on loan to Go Ahead Eagles, now sold to Excel Mouscron)
—	FW	CGO	Yannick Loemba (was on loan to OH Leuven, now sold to Adana Demirspor)

==== Sint-Truiden ====
In:

No.	Pos.	Nation	Player
—	FW	NED	Elton Acolatse (on loan from Club Brugge)
—	DF	FRA	Fabien Antunes (from Oostende)
—	MF	GHA	Samuel Asamoah (from Eupen)
—	DF	ESP	Sergio Ayala (from Valencia Mestalla)
—	MF	COD	Jordan Botaka (on loan from Leeds United)
—	MF	ESP	Cristian Ceballos (was on loan from Charlton Athletic, now bought)
—	MF	GRE	Charis Charisis (on loan from PAOK)
—	DF	GRE	Dimitrios Goutas (on loan from Olympiacos)
—	FW	SEN	Babacar Guèye (on loan from Hannover 96)
—	DF	GRE	Stelios Kitsiou (on loan from PAOK)
—	MF	BEL	Jonathan Legear (from Standard Liège)
—	FW	MAR	Yassine Salah (on loan from Union SG)
—	GK	BEL	Marten Schevenels (from Genk)
—	GK	BEL	Kenny Steppe (from Zulte Waregem)
—	DF	POR	Jorge Teixeira (from Charlton Athletic)
—	FW	ANG	Igor Vetokele (again on loan from Charlton Athletic)

Out:

No.	Pos.	Nation	Player
2	DF	BEL	Brandon Mechele (loan return to Club Brugge)
3	DF	TOG	Djené (to Getafe)
4	DF	ESP	Jorge Pulido (to Huesca)
7	MF	CMR	Fabien Tchenkoua (released)
8	MF	BEL	Stef Peeters (to Caen)
9	FW	GER	Nick Proschwitz (end of contract)
13	GK	BEL	Sébastien Bruzzese (loan return to Club Brugge)
14	MF	BEL	Pieter Gerkens (to Anderlecht)
16	DF	CHI	Cristián Cuevas (loan return to Chelsea)
18	DF	CIV	Mamadou Bagayoko (to OH Leuven)
22	FW	BEL	Wolke Janssens (on loan to Lierse)
24	MF	FRA	Pierrick Valdivia (to Nîmes)
26	DF	POR	Rúben Fernandes (to Portimonense)
27	MF	BEL	Iebe Swers (on loan to Lommel)
31	DF	BEL	Boli Bolingoli-Mbombo (loan return to Club Brugge)
—	FW	BEL	Lucas Damblon (was on loan to ASV Geel, now loaned to RWDM47)
—	FW	GRE	Panagiotis Kynigopoulos (was on loan to Iraklis, now released to Panachaiki)
—	FW	HUN	Soma Novothny (was on loan to Diósgyőr, now sold to Újpest)
—	DF	BEL	Steve Ryckaert (on loan to Tubize)
—	MF	HUN	Donát Zsótér (was on loan to Budapest Honvéd, now sold to Újpest)

==== Standard Liège ====
In:

No.	Pos.	Nation	Player
12	MF	COD	Merveille Bokadi (was on loan from TP Mazembe, now bought)
26	DF	COD	Christian Luyindama (was on loan from TP Mazembe, now bought)
—	MF	NGR	Uche Henry Agbo (from Watford)
—	MF	BRA	Carlinhos (from Estoril)
—	DF	BEL	Luis Pedro Cavanda (on loan from Galatasaray)
—	FW	CRO	Duje Čop (from Cagliari)
—	MF	UGA	Farouk Miya (loan return from Excel Mouscron)
—	MF	COD	Paul-José M'Poku (from Chievo)
—	GK	MEX	Guillermo Ochoa (from Málaga)
—	MF	BEL	Jonathan Okita (loan return from Union SG)
—	DF	BEL	Sébastien Pocognoli (from West Bromwich Albion)

Out:

No.	Pos.	Nation	Player
4	DF	BEL	Ibrahima Cissé (to Fulham)
7	MF	TOG	Mathieu Dossevi (on loan to Metz)
8	FW	BEL	Benito Raman (on loan to Fortuna Düsseldorf)
17	FW	BEL	Ryan Mmaee (on loan to Waasland-Beveren)
20	DF	BEL	Samy Mmaee (on loan to MVV)
27	DF	COL	Darwin Andrade (to Deportivo Cali)
28	GK	BEL	Guillaume Hubert (to Club Brugge)
30	MF	BEL	Jonathan Legear (to Sint-Truiden)
99	FW	ALG	Ishak Belfodil (on loan to Werder Bremen)
—	FW	BEL	Ibrahima Bah (to Oostende)
—	FW	COD	Jonathan Bolingi (from TP Mazembe, then loaned to Excel Mouscron)
—	FW	BEL	Hugo Cuypers (was on loan to Seraing, now sold to Ergotelis)
—	MF	BRA	Danilo (loan return to Braga)
—	MF	FRA	Jean-Luc Dompé (was on loan to Eupen, now loaned to Amiens)
—	DF	BEL	Ayrton Mboko (to Union SG)
—	DF	SLO	Martin Milec (was on loan to Roda JC, now sold to Maribor)
—	FW	GHA	Benjamin Tetteh (was on loan to Slovácko, now loaned to Bohemians 1905)
—	MF	MLI	Birama Touré (was on loan to Auxerre, now sold)
—	GK	BEL	Senne Vits (was on loan to MVV, now released to Hasselt)
—	MF	BEL	Reno Wilmots (to Roeselare)
—	FW	GUI	Mohamed Yattara (was on loan to Auxerre, now sold)

==== Waasland-Beveren ====
In:

No.	Pos.	Nation	Player
44	MF	JPN	Ryota Morioka (from Śląsk Wrocław)
—	MF	CIV	Victorien Angban (on loan from Chelsea)
—	FW	BEL	Tuur Dierckx (from Antwerp)
—	FW	BEL	Ryan Mmaee (on loan from Standard Liège)
—	GK	BEL	Davy Roef (on loan from Anderlecht)
—	DF	BEL	Jur Schryvers (from Club Brugge)
—	FW	SWE	Isaac Kiese Thelin (on loan from Anderlecht)
—	MF	BEL	Joachim Van Damme (free agent)

Out:

No.	Pos.	Nation	Player
9	FW	BEL	Zinho Gano (to Oostende)
11	FW	BEL	Alessandro Cerigioni (on loan to Roeselare)
12	MF	FRA	Julian Michel (to Lokeren)
25	DF	BEL	Kjetil Borry (to Roeselare)
26	GK	HUN	László Köteles (loan return to Genk)
30	MF	BEL	Gilles Van Remoortere (to Hamme)
—	DF	BEL	Glenn Leemans (was on loan to Deinze, now sold to Londerzeel)
—	MF	BEL	Nicolas Orye (was on loan to Lommel, now loaned to Heist)
—	DF	BEL	Senne Van Dooren (on loan to Berchem Sport)

==== Zulte Waregem ====
In:

No.	Pos.	Nation	Player
—	MF	BEL	Sander Coopman (again on loan from Club Brugge)
—	MF	BEL	Gertjan De Mets (from Kortrijk)
—	MF	BEL	Nill De Pauw (from Guingamp)
—	MF	BEL	Julien De Sart (on loan from Middlesbrough)
—	DF	CIV	Idrissa Doumbia (on loan from Anderlecht)
—	MF	HAI	Andy Faustin (from Valenciennes)
—	DF	BEL	Michaël Heylen (from Anderlecht)
—	MF	CYP	Grigoris Kastanos (on loan from Juventus)
—	GK	ITA	Nicola Leali (on loan from Juventus)
—	FW	BEL	Aaron Leya Iseka (on loan from Anderlecht)
—	FW	NGR	Peter Olayinka (on loan from Gent)
—	MF	NOR	Fredrik Oldrup Jensen (from Odd)
—	MF	ISR	Ben Reichert (from Hapoel Tel Aviv)
—	FW	SRB	Ivan Šaponjić (on loan from Benfica)
—	DF	NED	Sandy Walsh (from Genk)

Out:

No.	Pos.	Nation	Player
4	MF	ITA	Luca Marrone (loan return to Juventus)
8	DF	DEN	Lukas Lerager (to Bordeaux)
9	FW	SEN	Mbaye Leye (to Eupen)
11	FW	BEL	Jens Naessens (loan return to Mechelen)
14	DF	DEN	Henrik Dalsgaard (to Brentford)
17	MF	FRA	Soualiho Meïté (converted loan from Lille, then sold to Monaco)
19	FW	SEN	Babacar Guèye (loan return to Hannover 96)
22	GK	BEL	Kenny Steppe (to Sint-Truiden)
23	MF	BEL	Christophe Lepoint (to Kortrijk)
30	MF	DEN	Jakob Ankersen (to AGF)
31	FW	NED	Robert Mühren (on loan to Sparta Rotterdam)
—	MF	BEL	Sebastiaan Brebels (was on loan to Cercle Brugge, now released to Lommel)
—	FW	BEL	Stephen Buyl (was on loan to Antwerp, now sold to Cercle Brugge)
—	MF	BEL	Charni Ekangamene (was on loan to NAC Breda, now sold to Beerschot Wilrijk)
—	DF	MAR	Karim Essikal (was on loan to Excel Mouscron, now sold to Beerschot Wilrijk)
—	DF	BEL	Bryan Verboom (was on loan to Roda JC, now loaned to Kortrijk)
—	MF	BEL	Azzeddine Zaidi (to ASV Geel)

=== Belgian First Division B teams ===
==== Beerschot Wilrijk ====
In:

No.	Pos.	Nation	Player
—	DF	CIV	Abdel Diarra (from Syrianska)
—	DF	BEL	Joren Dom (from Antwerp)
—	MF	BEL	Charni Ekangamene (from Zulte Waregem)
—	DF	MAR	Karim Essikal (from Zulte Waregem)
—	FW	COD	Kule Mbombo (on loan from Vita Club)
—	MF	BRA	Octávio (from Botafogo)
—	GK	VEN	Rafael Romo (from APOEL)
—	MF	BEL	Tom Van Hyfte (from Roda JC)

Out:

No.	Pos.	Nation	Player
1	GK	BEL	Michaël Clepkens (on loan to Lommel)
8	MF	BEL	Kevin Geudens (to De Kempen)
9	FW	BEL	Simon Vermeiren (to Lommel)
13	FW	BEL	Bjorn Ruytinx (released)
26	DF	BEL	Kenny Thompson (to Nijlen)
—	FW	ESP	Antonio Muñoz-Herrera (was on loan to Rupel Boom, now sold to KRC Gent)
—	FW	ROU	Vlad Rusu (to Luceafărul Oradea)

==== Cercle Brugge ====
In:

No.	Pos.	Nation	Player
—	FW	BEL	Gianni Bruno (from Evian)
—	FW	BEL	Stephen Buyl (from Zulte Waregem)
—	FW	FRA	Irvin Cardona (on loan from Monaco)
—	FW	BRA	Crysan (on loan from Atlético Paranaense)
—	FW	BEL	Dylan De Belder (from Lierse)
—	DF	FRA	Benjamin Delacourt (from Deinze)
—	MF	ARG	Jonathan Farias (from Boca Juniors)
—	MF	ESP	Javier García Guillén (from Villarreal B)
—	DF	FRA	Jordy Gaspar (on loan from Monaco)
—	MF	BRA	Vagner Gonçalves (from Sabutarlo)
—	DF	BEN	Emmanuel Imorou (from Caen)
—	MF	CIV	Isaac Koné (from Antwerp)
—	MF	FRA	Xavier Mercier (from Kortrijk)
—	MF	FRA	Jonathan Mexique (on loan from Monaco)
—	MF	FRA	Tristan Muyumba (on loan from Monaco)
—	GK	FRA	Paul Nardi (again on loan from Monaco)
—	MF	KEN	Johanna Omolo (from Antwerp)
—	MF	GAB	Lloyd Palun (from Red Star)
—	MF	FRA	Gaëtan Robail (on loan from Paris Saint-Germain)
—	DF	ESP	Héctor Rodas (from Córdoba)
—	DF	MNE	Aleksandar Šofranac (from Rijeka)
—	DF	FRA	Jérémy Taravel (from Gent)
—	FW	FRA	Guévin Tormin (on loan from Monaco)
—	GK	BEL	Brian Vandenbussche (from Gent)

Out:

No.	Pos.	Nation	Player
7	FW	BEL	Ilombe Mboyo (loan return to Sion)
8	FW	GUI	Tafsir Chérif (loan return to Monaco)
9	FW	BEL	Arne Naudts (to Helmond Sport)
12	FW	CRO	Tomislav Kiš (loan return to Kortrijk)
14	MF	BEL	Sebastiaan Brebels (loan return to Zulte Waregem)
15	DF	FRA	Pierre Bourdin (to Lierse)
17	MF	FRA	Raphaël Diarra (loan return to Monaco)
18	DF	FRA	Mehdi Beneddine (loan return to Monaco)
22	FW	BEL	Paolino Bertaccini (loan return to Genk)
25	MF	BEL	Niels Coussement (on loan to Knokke)
26	FW	GUI	Alhassane Soumah (loan return to Juventus)
27	DF	BEL	Gilles Dewaele (to Westerlo)
33	MF	BEL	Mathieu Maertens (to OH Leuven)
42	GK	BEL	Thomas De Bie (to Oostende)
77	FW	BEL	Ivan Yagan (to Lierse)
83	GK	BEL	Gilles Lentz (loan return to Kortrijk)
91	MF	BEL	Samuel Fabris (to Virton)
—	DF	HAI	Carlens Arcus (signed from Lille, then loaned to Auxerre)
—	MF	BEL	Thomas Jutten (again on loan to Dessel Sport)
—	FW	BEL	Laurenz Simoens (was on loan to Gullegem, now sold)
—	GK	BEL	Mathieu Vanderschaeghe (to Mandel United)
—	FW	BEL	Maxim Vandewalle (was on loan to Knokke, now sold)
—	MF	BEL	Karel Van Roose (was on loan to Oosterzonen Oosterwijk, now loaned to Torhout)

==== Lierse ====
In:

No.	Pos.	Nation	Player
—	FW	BEL	Nico Binst (from Antwerp)
—	DF	FRA	Pierre Bourdin (from Cercle Brugge)
—	FW	BEL	Illies Bruylandts (loan return from RWDM47)
—	DF	BRA	Andrei Camargo (from Tubize)
—	DF	LUX	Tim Hall (from SV Elversberg)
—	FW	BEL	Wolke Janssens (on loan from Sint-Truiden)
—	MF	BEL	Mégan Laurent (from Tubize)
—	MF	BEL	Brice Ntambwe (loan return from Oosterzonen Oosterwijk)
—	MF	MAR	Brahim Sabaouni (loan return from Tubize)
—	FW	BEL	Ivan Yagan (from Cercle Brugge)

Out:

No.	Pos.	Nation	Player
5	DF	BDI	David Habarugira (released)
9	FW	BEL	Dylan De Belder (to Cercle Brugge)
11	MF	BEL	Manuel Benson (to Genk)
20	MF	GHA	Charles Ankomah (end of contract)
27	MF	BEL	Charles Kwateng (on loan to Mandel United)
31	GK	BEL	Mike Vanhamel (to Oostende)
—	GK	BEL	Jorn Brondeel (was on loan to NAC Breda, now sold to Twente)
—	DF	MAR	Ahmed El Messaoudi (was on loan to Mechelen, now sold)
—	DF	EGY	Karim Hafez (again on loan to Lens)
—	MF	EGY	Zizo (was on loan to Nacional, now sold to Moreirense)

==== OH Leuven ====
In:

No.	Pos.	Nation	Player
—	MF	FRA	Yannick Aguemon (from Union SG)
—	DF	CIV	Mamadou Bagayoko (from Sint-Truiden)
—	MF	BEL	Geert Berben (from Lommel)
—	DF	FRA	Benjamin Boulenger (on loan from Charleroi)
—	GK	CIV	Copa (from Lokeren)
—	DF	BEL	Dimitri Daeseleire (from Antwerp)
—	FW	SEN	Simon Diedhiou (from Gent)
—	DF	FRA	Clément Fabre (from Tubize)
—	MF	FRA	Julien Gorius (from Changchun Yatai)
—	MF	BEL	David Hubert (from Gent)
—	MF	BEL	Mathieu Maertens (from Cercle Brugge)
—	DF	ENG	Elliott Moore (on loan from Leicester City Reserves)
—	MF	NGR	Godwin Odibo (from Nath Boys Academy)
—	MF	BEL	Koen Persoons (from Lokeren)
—	DF	BEL	Kenneth Schuermans (from Westerlo)
—	MF	BEL	Nikola Storm (again on loan from Club Brugge)
—	DF	BEL	Derrick Tshimanga (from Willem II)
—	FW	SCO	Tony Watt (from Charlton Athletic)

Out:

No.	Pos.	Nation	Player
2	DF	BEL	Soufiane El Banouhi (to Union SG)
3	MF	BEL	Fazlı Kocabaş (released)
4	DF	FRA	Romain Reynaud (to Andrézieux-Bouthéon)
5	DF	BEL	Pierre-Yves Ngawa (to Avellino)
6	MF	BEL	Kenneth Houdret (to Union SG)
7	MF	BEL	Jonathan Kindermans (released)
10	FW	CMR	Serge Tabekou (loan return to Gent)
11	FW	BEL	Ben Yagan (to Dessel Sport)
12	DF	BEL	Jeroen Simaeys (released)
15	DF	BEL	Pieter-Jan Monteyne (to Roeselare)
16	MF	BEL	Jordy Lokando (on loan to Heist)
17	DF	BEL	Nathan Durieux (released)
19	DF	FRA	Cédric D'Ulivo (to FH)
20	FW	BEL	Din Sula (on loan to Lommel)
22	MF	BEL	Simon Bracke (to Hasselt)
24	MF	BEL	Lucas Schoofs (loan return to Gent)
25	MF	BEL	Nicolas Delporte (released)
27	MF	BEL	Mehdi Bounou (to Heist)
28	DF	BEL	Siebe Horemans (loan return to Gent)
29	MF	BEL	Leo Njengo (on loan to Dessel Sport)
30	FW	CGO	Yannick Loemba (loan return to Oostende)
—	FW	BEL	Benjamin Bambi (on loan to Heist)
—	DF	BEL	Nathan de Medina (loan return to Anderlecht)

==== Roeselare ====
In:

No.	Pos.	Nation	Player
—	MF	CHN	Wang Bin (from Shenyang Urban)
—	DF	BEL	Kjetil Borry (from Waasland-Beveren)
—	FW	CRO	Fran Brodić (on loan from Club Brugge)
—	FW	BEL	Alessandro Cerigioni (on loan from Waasland-Beveren)
—	GK	BEL	Yves De Winter (from Roda JC)
—	MF	BEL	Guy Dufour (from Eupen)
—	DF	NED	Danzell Gravenberch (on loan from Reading)
—	MF	CHN	Xu Jiajun (from Hebei Fortune)
—	DF	BEL	Laurent Lemoine (on loan from Club Brugge)
—	FW	BIH	Marko Maletić (from Lommel)
—	DF	BEL	Pieter-Jan Monteyne (from OH Leuven)
—	MF	LIE	Sandro Wieser (on loan from Reading)
—	MF	BEL	Reno Wilmots (from Standard Liège)

Out:

No.	Pos.	Nation	Player
3	DF	BEL	Kevin Kis (to Union SG)
4	FW	CRO	Marin Jakoliš (to Admira Wacker)
10	MF	FRA	Samy Kehli (to Lokeren)
20	GK	BEL	Arne Sabbe (to Sint-Eloois-Winkel)
21	DF	CHN	Li Chenglong (loan return to Beijing Renhe)
25	MF	CHN	Sun Weizhe (loan return to Beijing Renhe)
27	DF	BEL	François Kompany (released)
30	MF	BEL	Lukas Van Eenoo (loan return to Kortrijk)
39	GK	BEL	Jo Coppens (to Carl Zeiss Jena)
88	FW	FRA	Florent Stevance (loan return to Charleroi)
99	FW	BEL	Dylan Lambrecth (loan return to Anderlecht)
—	DF	BEL	Tom Raes (was on loan to Hamme, now sold to Mandel United)
—	DF	BEL	Wout Van Poucke (to Harelbeke)

==== Tubize ====
In:

No.	Pos.	Nation	Player
—	DF	POR	Alexandre Alfaiate (from Benfica B)
—	MF	AUS	Panos Armenakas (on loan from Udinese)
—	DF	FRA	Maxence Carlier (on loan from Lens)
—	GK	BEL	Théo Defourny (from Excel Mouscron)
—	MF	NED	Ewout Gouw (from Vitesse)
—	MF	KOR	Hwang Ki-wook (on loan from Seoul)
—	DF	BEL	Steve Ryckaert (on loan from Sint-Truiden)
—	MF	JPN	Daisuke Sakai (on loan from Oita Trinita)
—	MF	FRA	Anthony Schuster (from Les Herbiers)
—	FW	FRA	Florent Stevance (on loan from Charleroi)
—	FW	CIV	Moussa Traoré (from Siah Jamegan)
—	MF	FRA	Hugo Vidémont (from Wisła Kraków)
—	MF	BEL	Marco Weymans (from Cardiff City Academy)

Out:

No.	Pos.	Nation	Player
1	GK	FRA	Quentin Beunardeau (to Metz)
8	DF	FRA	Clément Fabre (to OH Leuven)
9	FW	MLI	Mamadou Diallo (to Union SG)
11	MF	BEL	Mégan Laurent (to Lierse)
15	MF	FRA	Yohan Betsch (released)
21	MF	BEL	Selim Amallah (to Excel Mouscron)
26	DF	BEL	Anas Hamzaoui (to Union SG)
32	DF	BRA	Andrei Camargo (to Lierse)
39	MF	BEL	Jordan Henri (to Olympic Charleroi)
45	MF	BEL	Nicolas Garcia (to Grimbergen)
55	MF	MAR	Brahim Sabaouni (loan return to Lierse)
91	FW	FRA	Sega Keita (released)
—	DF	BEL	Badreddine Azzouzi (to Meux)

==== Union SG ====
In:

No.	Pos.	Nation	Player
—	FW	BEL	Christophe Bertjens (from Westerlo)
—	FW	MLI	Mamadou Diallo (from Tubize)
—	DF	BEL	Soufiane El Banouhi (from OH Leuven)
—	FW	BEL	Roman Ferber (from Charleroi)
—	DF	BEL	Anas Hamzaoui (from Tubize)
—	MF	BEL	Kenneth Houdret (from OH Leuven)
—	DF	BEL	Kevin Kis (from Roeselare)
—	GK	COD	Mulopo Kudimbana (from Antwerp)
—	FW	BEL	Dylan Lambrecth (on loan from Anderlecht)
—	MF	COD	Héritier Luvumbu (on loan from Vita Club)
—	DF	BEL	Ayrton Mboko (from Standard Liège)
—	DF	FRA	Thibault Peyre (from Excel Mouscron)
—	FW	CMR	Serge Tabekou (from Gent)
—	FW	BEL	Julien Vercauteren (from RNK Split)

Out:

No.	Pos.	Nation	Player
4	MF	FRA	Pierre‑Baptiste Baherlé (released)
6	FW	CAF	Quentin Ngakoutou (loan return to Monaco)
7	DF	BEL	Tracy Mpati (to Lokeren)
9	FW	FRA	Cédric Fauré (retired)
11	DF	BEL	Geoffrey Cabeke (to RWDM47)
13	DF	BEL	Vincent Vandiepenbeeck (to RWDM47)
14	MF	BEL	Lou Wallaert (to Rebecq)
19	GK	BEL	Anthony Sadin (to RWDM47)
20	MF	FRA	Yannick Aguemon (to OH Leuven)
31	DF	BEL	Georgios Kaminiaris (end of contract)
32	FW	SLO	Nicolas Rajsel (to Oostende)
93	FW	FRA	Florent Zitte (to Saint-Pierroise)
95	DF	BEL	Alessio Palmeri (to Olympic Charleroi)
97	FW	BEL	Mohammed Aoulad (to Wydad Casablanca)
—	FW	GLP	Mickaël Antoine-Curier (was on loan to Eendracht Aalst, then released)
—	FW	GUI	Yady Bangoura (signed from ASV Geel, then loaned to Eendracht Aalst)
—	GK	BEL	Yoran Chalon (was on loan to Rebecq, then sold to Acren Lessines)
—	DF	BEL	Constant Delsanne (was on loan to RWDM47, now sold to Rebecq)
—	MF	COD	Freddy Mombongo-Dues (on loan to RFC Liège)
—	MF	BEL	Jonathan Okita (loan return to Standard Liège)
—	FW	CMR	Hervé Onana (was on loan to Bornem, then released)
—	FW	MAR	Yassine Salah (on loan to Sint-Truiden)

==== Westerlo ====
In:

No.	Pos.	Nation	Player
2	DF	BEL	Maxime Biset (from Antwerp)
3	DF	BEL	Gilles Dewaele (from Cercle Brugge)
4	DF	BEL	Wouter Corstjens (from Lommel)
5	DF	BEL	Michiel Jaeken (from Antwerp)
6	MF	NED	Ismail H'Maidat (on loan from Roma)
9	FW	NGR	Christian Osaguona (from Mechelen)
11	FW	BEL	Jens Naessens (from Mechelen)
16	DF	BEL	Alessio Alessandro (loan return from Hades)
17	FW	GHA	Osah Bernardinho (from Attram de Visser Soccer Academy)
27	FW	BEL	Jordy Peffer (on loan from Mechelen)
29	DF	BEL	Bryan Van Den Bogaert (from Ebbsfleet United)
42	DF	GRE	Konstantinos Rougalas (from Târgu Mureș)
44	DF	GAB	Randal Oto'o (again on loan from Braga B)

Out:

No.	Pos.	Nation	Player
2	DF	NED	Mitch Apau (to Olimpija Ljubljana)
3	DF	BEL	Filip Daems (retired)
6	MF	BEL	Robin Henkens (released)
7	FW	ITA	Eric Lanini (loan return to Juventus)
7	FW	SWE	Marko Nikolić (to Brommapojkarna)
9	FW	NED	Elton Acolatse (to Club Brugge)
11	MF	TTO	Khaleem Hyland (to Al-Faisaly)
16	DF	ENG	Jordan Mustoe (released)
17	DF	BEL	Kenneth Schuermans (to OH Leuven)
22	DF	BEL	Gilles Ruyssen (to Lommel)
24	DF	BEL	Michaël Heylen (loan return to Anderlecht)
29	MF	BEL	Yoni Buyens (loan return to Genk)
35	FW	CGO	Silvère Ganvoula (loan return to Anderlecht)
44	DF	BEL	Hervé Matthys (loan return to Anderlecht)
73	DF	SRB	Nemanja Miletić (to Partizan)
97	FW	SWE	Carlos Strandberg (loan return to Club Brugge)
—	FW	BEL	Christophe Bertjens (signed from Lommel, then sold to Union SG)
—	MF	BEL	Jarno Molenberghs (was on loan to Lommel, then released to Oosterzonen Oosterwijk)
—	MF	BEL	Jore Trompet (was on loan to Rupel Boom, now released to Temse)
—	FW	LAT	Eduards Višņakovs (was on loan to Ruch Chorzów, now sold to RFS)
