= Azzouzi =

Azzouzi is a surname. Notable people with the surname include:

- Azzedine Azzouzi (born 1947), Algerian middle-distance runner
- Badreddine Azzouzi (born 1996), Belgian footballer
- Rachid Azzouzi (born 1971), Moroccan footballer
- Yassin El-Azzouzi (born 1983), French-Moroccan footballer
- Zakaria El Azzouzi (born 1996), Dutch-born Moroccan footballer
