= Yassine Salah =

Moroccan footballer

Personal information
- Date of birth: 27 March 1998 (age 28)
- Place of birth: Al Hoceima, Morocco
- Position: Winger

Youth career
- Real Madrid
- –2012: Anderlecht
- 2012–2014: Mechelen
- 2014–2016: Union SG

Senior career*
Years	Team	Apps	(Gls)
2016–2018	Union SG	4	(0)
2017–2018	→ Sint-Truidense II (loan)	?	(?)
2018	Sporting Charleroi	?	(?)
- * Club domestic league appearances and goals as of 2:15, 24 January 2017 (UTC)

Yassine Salah (born 27 March 1998) is a Moroccan professional footballer who most recently played as a winger for Sporting Charleroi.

== Playing career ==
=== Early years ===
As a child, Salah lived in Spain with his mother, where he played in the Real Madrid youth academy. When she moved him to Belgium, he joined the Anderlecht youth squad, initially playing with the U11 team. From there, he moved to Mechelen, representing Malinwa at the U16 and U17 levels. After two years, Salah returned to Brussels to join Union SG, where he remained until he was called up to the first team in 2016 by manager Marc Grosjean.

=== Professional career ===
Salah signed a two-year contract with Union SG in August 2016. He made his professional debut in the Belgian First Division B during a 3–0 loss against Tubize on 17 December 2016, coming on as a substitute for Nicolas Rajsel in the 86th minute.

On 17 July 2018, Salah signed with Sporting Charleroi. He left the club again at the end of 2018. The club announced that 'Salah stayed for several weeks in Morocco for personal reasons' and 'the young striker never entered the plans of the staff'.
