= Laurenz Simoens =

Belgian footballer

Personal information
- Full name: Laurenz Simoens
- Date of birth: 21 April 1998 (age 28)
- Place of birth: Belgium
- Position: Forward

Team information
- Current team: Gullegem

Youth career
- –2015: Cercle Brugge KSV

Senior career*
Years	Team	Apps	(Gls)
2015–2017	Cercle Brugge KSV	10	(0)
2017	→ Gullegem (loan)	0	(0)
2017–	Gullegem	0	(0)
- * Club domestic league appearances and goals as of 17 December 2016 (UTC)

Laurenz Simoens (born 21 April 1998) is a Belgian footballer who currently plays for Gullegem as a forward.
