= Ibrahima Bah =

Guinean footballer (born 1999)

Personal information
- Full name: Ibrahima Sory Bah
- Date of birth: 1 January 1999 (age 27)
- Place of birth: Namur, Belgium
- Height: 1.73 m (5 ft 8 in)
- Position: Forward

Team information
- Current team: Dubai United
- Number: 67

Senior career*
Years	Team	Apps	(Gls)
2017	Standard Liège	1	(0)
2017–2019	Oostende	1	(0)
2018–2019	→ RWDM47 (loan)	27	(4)
2019–2021	Union SG	6	(3)
2021–2022	Rayo Cantabria	13	(0)
2023	Rupel Boom	10	(3)
2023–2024	Thes Sport	13	(1)
2024–2025	F91 Dudelange	10	(1)
2025–	Dubai United	0	(0)

International career^{‡}
2015	Belgium U16	3	(0)
2020	Guinea	1	(0)
- * Club domestic league appearances and goals as of 14 February 2025 ‡ National team caps and goals as of 15 September 2024

Ibrahima Sory Bah (born 1 January 1999) is a professional footballer who plays as a forward for Emirati club Dubai United. Born in Belgium, he represents the Guinea national team.

== Professional career ==
=== Standard Liege ===
Bah made his professional debut for Standard Liège in a 3-0 Belgian First Division A loss to Kortrijk on 4 February 2017.

=== Oostende ===
On 3 June 2017, Bah transferred to Oostende, signing a contract for 3 years.

=== Rayo Cantabria ===
On 31 August 2021, he joined Rayo Cantabria in the Spanish fourth-tier Segunda División RFEF, the reserve team of Racing de Santander.

== International career ==
Bah was born in Belgium and is Guinean by descent. He was a youth international for Belgium. On 10 October 2020, he represented the Guinea national team in a 2–1 friendly win over Cape Verde.
