= Clément Libertiaux =

Belgian footballer

Personal information
- Date of birth: 21 February 1998 (age 28)
- Place of birth: Namur, Belgium
- Height: 1.85 m (6 ft 1 in)
- Position: Goalkeeper

Team information
- Current team: Union Namur
- Number: 27

Youth career
- 2007–2010: Charleroi
- 2010–2013: Anderlecht
- 2013–2016: Charleroi

Senior career*
Years	Team	Apps	(Gls)
2017–2020	Mouscron	1	(0)
2020	→ RAAL La Louvière (loan)	4	(0)
2020–2023	RAAL La Louvière	47	(0)
2023–2024	RFC Meux	17	(0)
2024–2205	Francs Borains	6	(0)
2025–	Union Namur	29	(0)
- * Club domestic league appearances and goals as of 28 June 2026

Clément Libertiaux (born 21 February 1998) is a Belgian professional footballer who plays as a goalkeeper for Belgian Division 1 club Union Namur.

== Professional career ==
On 27 June 2017, Libertiaux signed his first professional contract with Royal Excel Mouscron for 3 years. He made his professional debut in a 1-1 Belgian First Division A with Sint-Truidense V.V. on 2 December 2017. He made his debut at the age of 19 after the first keeper Logan Bailly tore his abductor muscle, and the second keeper Jean Butez suffered a concussion before the game.

On 24 December 2019 it was confirmed, that Libertiaux had joined La Louvière on loan for the rest of the season. In April 2020 the club announced, that they had signed the goalkeeper on a permanent deal from the upcoming season, where his deal with Mouscron also expired.
