= Tracy Mpati =

Belgian footballer

Personal information
- Full name: Tracy Mpati Bibuangu
- Date of birth: 21 March 1992 (age 34)
- Place of birth: Brussels, Belgium
- Height: 1.75 m (5 ft 9 in)
- Position: Right-back

Team information
- Current team: Crossing Schaerbeek
- Number: 21

Senior career*
Years	Team	Apps	(Gls)
2011–2014	White Star Bruxelles	58	(4)
2014–2015	KRC Mechelen	28	(0)
2015–2017	Union SG	71	(1)
2017–2020	Lokeren	36	(0)
2020–2022	RWDM	37	(1)
2022–2024	Francs Borains	56	(2)
2024–	Crossing Schaerbeek	16	(0)
- * Club domestic league appearances and goals as of 7 February 2026

Tracy Mpati Bibuangu (born 21 March 1992) is a Belgian professional footballer who plays as a right back for Crossing Schaerbeek.

== Club career ==
Tracy Mpati started his career with White Star Bruxelles.

In May 2020, it was announced that Mpati had signed a two-year contract with an option for an additional year with RWDM, after his former club Lokeren had folded.

== Personal life ==
Mpati was born in Belgium and is of Congolese descent.
