= Gianlucca Fatecha =

Paraguayan footballer (born 1998)

Personal information
- Full name: Gianlucca Fatecha Benitez
- Date of birth: 17 February 1998 (age 28)
- Place of birth: Asunción, Paraguay
- Height: 1.78 m (5 ft 10 in)
- Position: Midfielder

Team information
- Current team: Atlántida SC

Youth career
- –2018: Olimpia
- 2017–2018: → Anderlecht (loan)

Senior career*
Years	Team	Apps	(Gls)
2016–2020	Olimpia	11	(0)
2020	12 de Octubre	0	(0)
2021	River Plate	5	(0)
2022	Sol de América	0	(0)
2023–2024	Cienciano	-	(-)
2025	Recoleta F.C	-	(-)
2026	Atlántida SC	-	(-)
- * Club domestic league appearances and goals

Gianlucca Fatecha Benitez (born 17 January 1998) is a Paraguayan footballer who plays as a midfielder for Paraguayan third division side Atlántida SC.

== Career ==
Fatecha started his career with Olimpia, Paraguay's most successful club, where he made 11 league appearances and scored 0 goals.

In 2017, Fatecha was sent on loan to the youth academy of Anderlecht, the most successful team in Belgium.

In 2020, he signed for Paraguayan side 12 de Octubre.
