= Karim Essikal =

Belgian-born Moroccan footballer

Personal information
- Date of birth: 8 February 1996 (age 30)
- Place of birth: Vilvoorde, Belgium
- Height: 1.89 m (6 ft 2 in)
- Position: Defensive midfielder

Team information
- Current team: Tubize-Braine
- Number: 3

Youth career
- 2002–2003: Vilvoorde
- 2003–2007: Black Star
- 2007–2008: Strombeek
- 2008–2011: FC Brussels
- 2011–2012: Lierse SK
- 2012–2014: Club Brugge

Senior career*
Years	Team	Apps	(Gls)
2014–2017	Zulte Waregem	26	(1)
2016–2017	→ Royal Excel Mouscron (loan)	7	(0)
2017–2018	Beerschot	8	(0)
2018–2020	Eindhoven	62	(1)
2020–2021	Hassania Agadir	4	(0)
2021–2022	Oudenaarde	8	(0)
2022–2023	URSL Visé	30	(0)
2023–	Tubize-Braine	64	(2)

International career
2013	Morocco U17	1	(0)
- * Club domestic league appearances and goals as of 6 June 2025

Karim Essikal (born 8 February 1996) is a Moroccan footballer who plays for Belgian Division 2 club Tubize-Braine.

Essikal was born in Belgium to parents of Moroccan descent. He debuted for the Morocco national under-17 football team in a 2013 FIFA U-17 World Cup 4–2 win against Panama U17.
