= Corentin Koçur =

Belgian footballer (born 1995)

Personal information
- Date of birth: 17 October 1995 (age 31)
- Place of birth: Tourcoing, France
- Height: 1.81 m (5 ft 11 in)
- Position: Forward

Team information
- Current team: Stade Mouscronnois

Youth career
- –2003: RC Lens
- 2003–2010: RE Mouscron
- 2010–2014: Mouscron-Péruwelz

Senior career*
Years	Team	Apps	(Gls)
2014–2017	Mouscron-Péruwelz	11	(0)
2017	→ KVK Westhoek (loan)		
2017–2020	Fola Esch	38	(6)
2020–2022	Knokke	7	(0)
2022	KVK Westhoek	3	(0)
2023–	Stade Mouscronnois	27	(7)
- * Club domestic league appearances and goals as of 14:52, 23 June 2024 (UTC)

Corentin Koçur (born 10 October 1995) is a Belgian footballer.
