= Jordan Henri =

Belgian footballer

Personal information
- Full name: Jordan Henri
- Date of birth: 30 April 1993 (age 33)
- Place of birth: Belgium
- Height: 1.79 m (5 ft 10 1/2 in)
- Position: Winger

Team information
- Current team: La Louvière
- Number: 11

Senior career*
| Years | Team | Apps | (Gls) |
| 2010–2015 | UR La Louvière | 90 | (19) |
| 2015–2017 | AFC Tubize | 19 | (1) |
| 2017–2019 | Olympic Charleroi | 45 | (10) |
| 2019– | La Louvière | 16 | (5) |
- * Club domestic league appearances and goals as of 25 February 2020 (UTC)

Jordan Henri (born 30 April 1993) is a Belgian footballer who currently plays for La Louvière as a winger.

== Career ==
In August 2017, Henri joined Olympic Charleroi. He played for the club for two years, before joining La Louvière.
