= Fabien Tchenkoua =

Cameroonian footballer (born 1992)

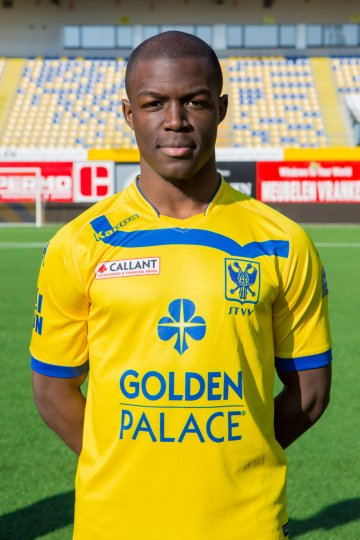
- Tchenkoua with Sint-Truiden in 2016

Personal information
- Full name: Fabien Tchenkoua Mouko
- Date of birth: 1 October 1992 (age 34)
- Place of birth: Nkongsamba, Cameroon
- Height: 1.73 m (5 ft 8 in)
- Position: Winger

Youth career
- Sedan

Senior career*
Years	Team	Apps	(Gls)
2012–2013	Sedan	16	(0)
2012–2013	Sedan II	6	(1)
2013–2014	Paris FC	22	(2)
2013–2014	Paris FC II	5	(1)
2014–2015	GF38	30	(8)
2015–2016	Nîmes	16	(2)
2015–2016	Nîmes II	2	(1)
2016–2017	Sint-Truiden	22	(0)
2017–2018	Bourg-Péronnas	9	(0)
2018–2019	Carl Zeiss Jena	14	(1)
2018–2020	Carl Zeiss Jena II	11	(2)
2021–2022	GFA Rumilly-Vallières	14	(1)
- * Club domestic league appearances and goals as of 14:08, 19 September 2025 (UTC)

Fabien Tchenkoua Mouko (born 1 October 1992) is a Cameroonian professional footballer who most recently played for French club GFA Rumilly-Vallières.

== Career ==
Tchenkoua was born in Nkongsamba in Cameroon. In July 2013, he moved from Sedan to Paris FC. The following year, in August, he transferred to Grenoble. He was part of the Grenoble team that beat Marseille in the first round of the Coupe de France on penalties on 4 January 2015. Despite not scoring any goals, he was seen as one of the heroes by destroying the opponent's defence. He signed for Nîmes the year after. In January 2016 he moved to Sint-Truiden.

After suffering a cruciate ligament rupture Tchenkoua moved to Ligue 2 side Bourg-Péronnas in October 2017 on a contract until the end of the season.
