= Ewout Gouw =

Dutch footballer

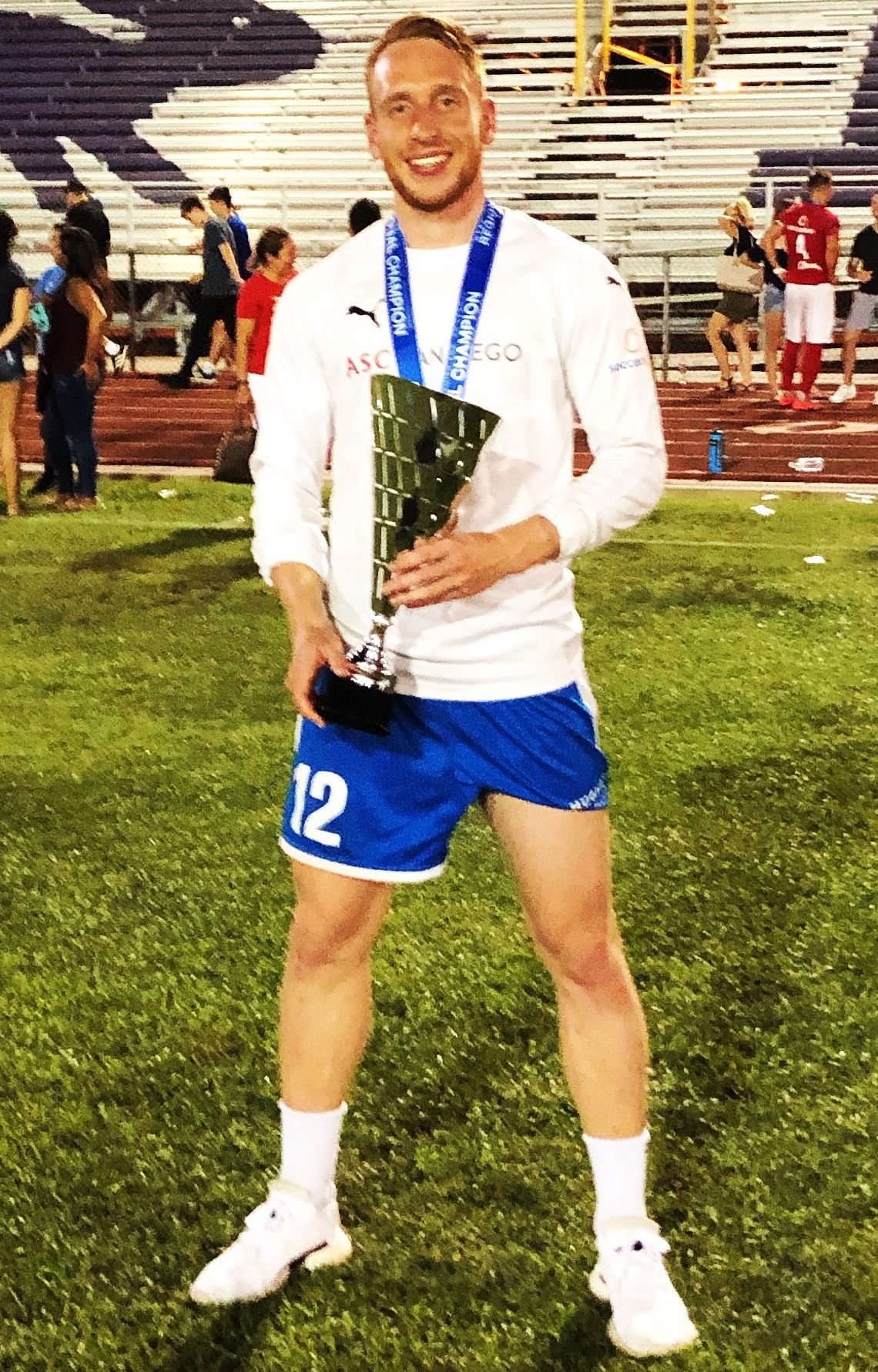

Personal information
- Full name: Ewout Gouw
- Date of birth: 6 January 1995 (age 31)
- Place of birth: Ede, Netherlands
- Height: 1.78 m (5 ft 10 in)
- Position: Midfielder

Youth career
- –2005: VV Lunteren
- 2005–2014: Vitesse

Senior career*
Years	Team	Apps	(Gls)
2014–2017	Jong Vitesse	33	(5)
2017–2018	Tubize	11	(0)
2018	TEC	9	(1)
2019	ASC San Diego	18	(3)
2020-2021	Miami Dutch Lions		
2021-2024	Dade County Football Club	52	(14)
- * Club domestic league appearances and goals as of 18:21, 10 March, 2024 (UTC)

Ewout Gouw (born 6 January 1995) is a Dutch professional footballer who most recently played as a midfielder for Dade County FC in the United States.

== Career ==
=== Club career ===
Gouw grew up in Lunteren where he started playing football at hometown club VV Lunteren and signed his first professional contract with Vitesse at the age of 18. Following his release from boyhood club Vitesse in June 2017, Gouw joined Belgian side Tubize ahead of the 2017–18 campaign. On 12 August 2017, Gouw made his Tubize debut during their 1–1 draw with Westerlo, featuring for the entire 90 minutes.

=== United States ===
In January 2019, Gouw moved to United States, San Diego, to work on his professional career outside of professional football and also joined ASC San Diego in the NPSL Southwestern Conference. Gouw was studying an MBA degree to prepare for a management career. He moved to Florida to join the Miami Dutch Lions for the 2020 season.

== Career statistics ==
As of match played 17 December 2017.

Club	Season	League			Cup		Europe		Other		Total	
Club	Season	Division	Apps	Goals	Apps	Goals	Apps	Goals	Apps	Goals	Apps	Goals
Tubize	2017–18	Belgian First Division B	10	0	1	0	—		—		11	0
Career total			10	0	1	0	0	0	0	0	11	0
