= Peter Hackenberg =

German footballer

Personal information
- Date of birth: 6 February 1989 (age 37)
- Place of birth: Eutin, West Germany
- Height: 1.96 m (6 ft 5 in)
- Position: Centre-back

Senior career*
Years	Team	Apps	(Gls)
2007–2009	FC Energie Cottbus II	60	(3)
2008–2009	FC Energie Cottbus	0	(0)
2010–2011	Wacker Burghausen	12	(0)
2011–2013	1. FC Magdeburg	39	(1)
2013–2015	Alemannia Aachen	76	(0)
2015	Alemannia Aachen II	1	(0)
2016–2017	KAS Eupen	34	(1)
2018–2022	Alemannia Aachen	89	(2)
- * Club domestic league appearances and goals

Peter Hackenberg (born 6 February 1989) is a German former footballer who played as centre-back.
