= Nico Binst =

Belgian footballer

Personal information
- Date of birth: 20 May 1992 (age 34)
- Place of birth: Wolvertem, Belgium
- Height: 1.83 m (6 ft 0 in)
- Position: Forward

Team information
- Current team: Merelbeke
- Number: 30

Youth career
- 1999–2004: Wolvertem SC
- 2004–2005: FCN Sint-Niklaas
- 2005–2007: FCV Dender EH
- 2007–2008: Club Brugge
- 2008–2013: KSC Lokeren

Senior career*
Years	Team	Apps	(Gls)
2013–2015	Hamme	64	(33)
2015–2017	Antwerp	32	(7)
2017–2018	Lierse	9	(2)
2018–2019	RWDM47	13	(3)
2019	Eendracht Aalst	10	(1)
2019–2020	Rupel Boom	24	(9)
2020–2022	Knokke	13	(1)
2022–	Merelbeke	120	(61)
- * Club domestic league appearances and goals as of 3 May 2026

Nico Binst (born 20 May 1992) is a Belgian professional footballer who plays as a forward for Merelbeke in the Belgian National Division 1.

== Career ==
In April 2020, it was announced that Binst had signed with Knokke, joining them in July 2020 after the expiration of his contract with Rupel Boom.
