= Charles Ankomah =

Ghanaian professional football player

Personal information
- Date of birth: 10 April 1996 (age 30)
- Place of birth: Accra, Ghana
- Height: 1.68 m (5 ft 6 in)
- Position: Central midfielder

Team information
- Current team: Merelbeke
- Number: 10

Youth career
- JMG Academy Accra

Senior career*
Years	Team	Apps	(Gls)
2015–2017	Lierse	30	(1)
2018	Olympique Londais		
2018	Național Sebiș		
2019	Lugoj		
2019	Merelbeke		
- * Club domestic league appearances and goals as of 27 February 2019

Charles Ankomah (born 10 April 1996) is a Ghanaian professional footballer who lastly played as a midfielder for KFC Merelbeke. Until this date 16/04/2024, he has been clubless for the past 4 years. He recently gave an interview with djNyame on svtv Africa explaining why he has no club now and life difficulties in Belgium. Here is a link to this interview Charles ankomah interview on svtv africa
