= Anthony Bassey =

Nigerian footballer

Personal information
- Date of birth: 20 July 1994 (age 32)
- Place of birth: Uyo, Nigeria
- Height: 1.69 m (5 ft 6 1/2 in)
- Positions: Right back; winger

Team information
- Current team: Jura Dolois

Youth career
- –2012: Aspire Academy

Senior career*
Years	Team	Apps	(Gls)
2012–2017	Eupen	116	(12)
2017–2019	Al-Wakrah		
2019–2020	Al-Markhiya		
2020–2022	Al-Nojoom		
2022	Saham Club		
2024–	Jura Dolois	7	(0)
- * Club domestic league appearances and goals as of 30 November 2024

Anthony Bassey (born 20 July 1994) is a Nigerian footballer who plays as a winger for French Championnat National 3 club Jura Dolois.
