= Brahim Sabaouni =

Moroccan footballer (born 1994)

Personal information
- Date of birth: 13 May 1994 (age 32)
- Place of birth: Lille, France
- Height: 1.85 m (6 ft 1 in)
- Position: Midfielder

Team information
- Current team: AS FAR
- Number: 8

Youth career
- 2012–2014: Dunkerque B
- 2014: Nike Academy
- 2014–2015: Lierse

Senior career*
Years	Team	Apps	(Gls)
2015–2018	Lierse	18	(0)
2016–2017	→ Tubize (loan)	5	(0)
2019	Olympique Marcquois	11	(0)
2019–2021	Seraing	42	(1)
2021–	AS FAR	21	(0)

International career
2016	Morocco U23	1	(0)
- * Club domestic league appearances and goals as of 3 October 2021

Brahim Sabaouni (13 May 1994) is a professional football player who plays as a midfielder for AS FAR. Born in France, he represented Morocco at under-23 international level.

== International career ==
Sabaouni was called up and capped for the Morocco U23s in a friendly 1–0 win against the Cameroon U23s.
