= Andy Faustin =

French-born Haitian footballer (born 1997)

Personal information
- Full name: Andy Faustin
- Date of birth: 25 March 1997 (age 29)
- Place of birth: Sarcelles, France
- Height: 1.82 m (6 ft 0 in)
- Position: Midfielder

Senior career*
Years	Team	Apps	(Gls)
2014–2016	Valenciennes B	16	(1)
2015–2017	Valenciennes	22	(2)
2017–2018	Zulte Waregem	0	(0)
- * Club domestic league appearances and goals as of 10:29, 8 August 2018 (UTC)

Andy Faustin (born 25 March 1997) is a French-born Haitian footballer who plays as a midfielder. He was called up the Haiti national football team for matches against Costa Rica and Jamaica in September 2016.
