= Sergio Ayala =

Spanish footballer (born 1993)

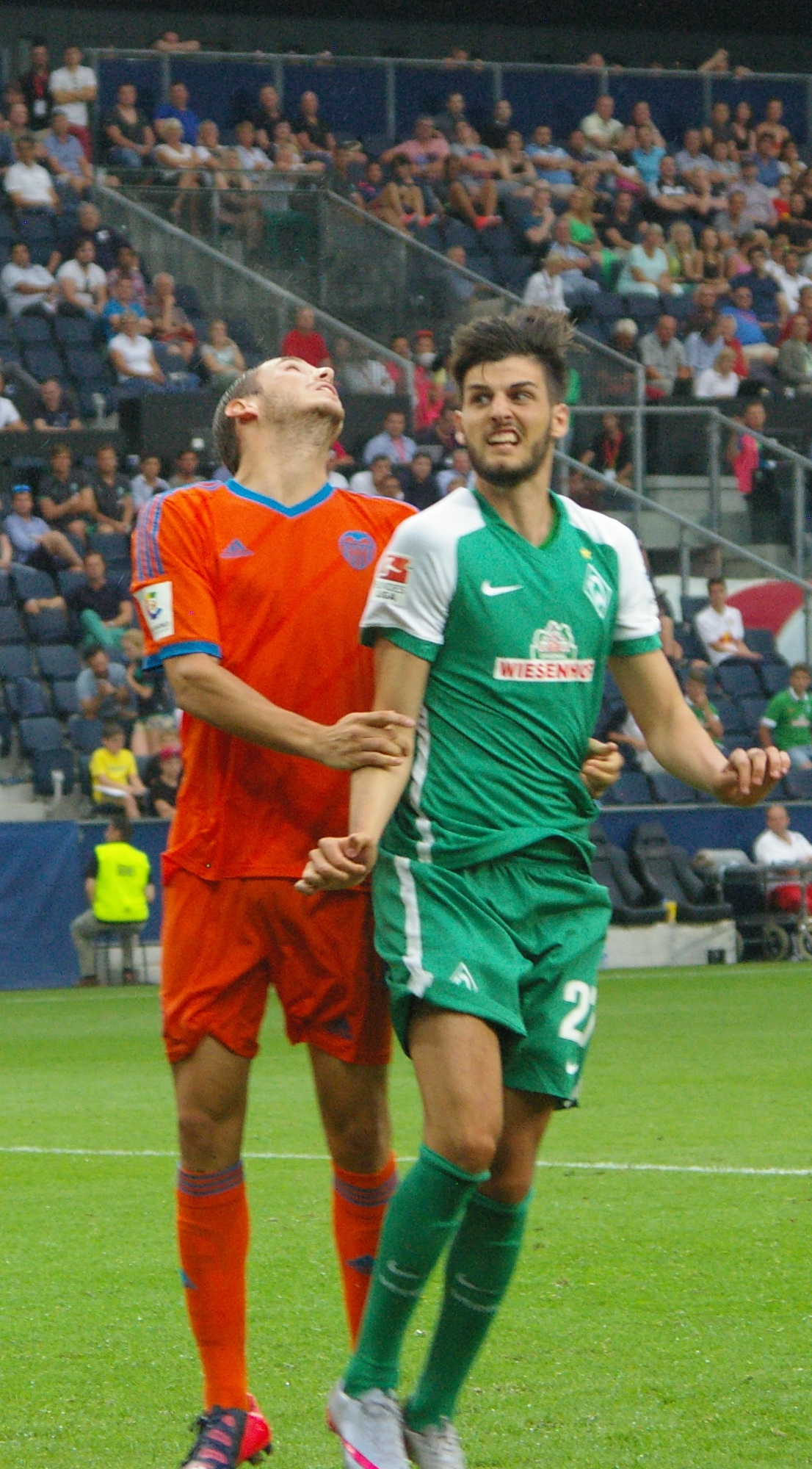
- Ayala (in orange) with Valencia B in 2015

Personal information
- Full name: Sergio Ayala López
- Date of birth: 19 March 1993 (age 33)
- Place of birth: Sant Feliu de Llobregat, Spain
- Height: 1.83 m (6 ft 0 in)
- Position: Centre-back

Team information
- Current team: Cornellà
- Number: 16

Youth career
- 2000–2012: Barcelona

Senior career*
Years	Team	Apps	(Gls)
2012–2014	Barcelona B	0	(0)
2012–2013	→ Alavés (loan)	8	(0)
2013–2014	→ Valencia B (loan)	33	(0)
2014–2017	Valencia B	97	(4)
2017–2018	Sint-Truidense	0	(0)
2018–2020	Cartagena	46	(0)
2021	Salamanca	17	(0)
2021–2023	San Fernando	46	(1)
2023–	Cornellà	20	(1)

International career
2012	Spain U19	1	(0)
- * Club domestic league appearances and goals as of 5 April 2024

Sergio Ayala López (born 19 March 1993) is a Spanish footballer who plays as a centre-back for Cornellà.

== Club career ==
Born in Sant Feliu de Llobregat, Barcelona, Catalonia, Ayala joined FC Barcelona's youth academy at the age of 7 in 2000. After being an undisputed starter of the Juvenil A during the 2011–12 season, he was promoted to the B-team on 18 June 2012, and signed a contract until 2015.

On 21 August 2012, Ayala joined Deportivo Alavés on loan for the 2012–13 season. On 21 August 2013, he moved to Valencia Mestalla on loan. After featuring 33 times for the side, he signed permanently with the club on 14 July 2014. On 20 September 2015, he scored his first goal for the club in a 2–3 defeat against UE Cornellà.

On 25 July 2017, Ayala moved abroad for the first time, signing for Belgian club Sint-Truidense V.V. on a one-year contract. On 13 July 2018, he returned to Spain and joined FC Cartagena for the upcoming season.
