= Ntuthuko Radebe =

South African soccer player

Personal information
- Full name: Ntuthuko Radebe
- Date of birth: 29 September 1994
- Place of birth: Johannesburg, South Africa
- Date of death: 4 July 2017 (aged 22)
- Place of death: Newcastle, South Africa
- Height: 1.65 m (5 ft 5 in)
- Position: Full-back

Youth career
- –2012: Aspire Academy
- 2012: K.A.S. Eupen

Senior career*
Years	Team	Apps	(Gls)
2012–2017	K.A.S. Eupen	35	(1)
- * Club domestic league appearances and goals

Ntuthuko Radebe (29 September 1994 – 4 July 2017) was a South African footballer who played as a full-back.

== Club career ==
=== Early career ===
Born in 1994 in Johannesburg, Radebe started his youth football career at Aspire Academy. In July 2012, he moved to Belgium side K.A.S. Eupen reserve team.

=== K.A.S. Eupen ===
In 2012, Radebe was called up for K.A.S. Eupen first team. On 15 December 2012, Radebe made his senior team debut in Belgian Second Division (currently Belgian First Division B) against Dessel Sport at Armand Melis Stadion, replacing Fazlı Kocabaş at the 82nd by coach Tintín Márquez. On 26 January 2014, he scored his first senior goal against SC Eendracht Aalst in the 20th minute. Radebe played 34 games and scored one goal in Belgian Second Division from 2012 to 2015. In the 2015–16 season, Eupen ended the season as runners-up and promoted to Belgian First Division A. On 15 October 2016, he made his Belgian First Division A debut against Waasland-Beveren, playing as a starter for 82 minutes.

== Death ==
On 4 July 2017, Radebe died in a car accident.
