= Badreddine Azzouzi =

Belgian footballer

Personal information
- Date of birth: 12 November 1996 (age 29)
- Place of birth: Belgium
- Position: Left-back

Team information
- Current team: Tubize-Braine

Youth career
- –2016: Tubize

Senior career*
| Years | Team | Apps | (Gls) |
| 2016–2017 | Tubize | 2 | (0) |
| 2017–2019 | Meux | 34 | (0) |
| 2019–2020 | Walhain | 14 | (2) |
| 2020– | Tubize-Braine | 7 | (0) |
- * Club domestic league appearances and goals as of 24 April 2022

Badreddine Azzouzi (born 12 November 1996) is a Belgian footballer who plays as a left-back for Belgian Division 2 club Tubize-Braine.

== Career ==
Azzouzi joined Meux in August 2017. He played for the club until the summer 2019, where he joined Walhain. He returned to his first club Tubize-Braine in 2020.
