= List of Belgian football transfers summer 2016 =

This is a list of Belgian football transfers for the 2016 summer transfer window. Only transfers involving a team from the professional divisions are listed, including the 16 teams in the Belgian First Division A and the 8 teams playing in the Belgian First Division B.

The summer transfer window will open on 1 July 2016, although some transfers were announced prior to that date. Players without a club may join one at any time, either during or in between transfer windows. The transfer window ends on 1 September 2016, although a few completed transfers could still be announced a few days later.

== Sorted by date ==
=== January 2016 ===
Date	Name	Moving from kola	Moving to	Fee	Note
January 4, 2016	Žarko Tomašević	Kortrijk	Oostende	Undisclosed	
January 19, 2016	Aaron Dhondt	Izegem	Waasland-Beveren	Undisclosed	

=== February 2016 ===
Date	Name	Moving from	Moving to	Fee	Note
February 9, 2016	Timo Cauwenberg	ASV Geel	Lommel United	Free	

=== March 2016 ===
Date	Name	Moving from	Moving to	Fee	Note
March 3, 2016	Tomislav Barbarić	Sarajevo	Kortrijk	Undisclosed	
March 3, 2016	Yves Lenaerts	OH Leuven	ASV Geel	Undisclosed	
March 15, 2016	Trezeguet	Al Ahly	Anderlecht	Undisclosed	(Note: Trezeguet was already on loan from Al Ahly to Anderlecht during the 2015–16 season. Anderlecht activated the buy clause in the loan contract to make the transfer permanent.)
March 17, 2016	Waldemar Sobota	Club Brugge	St. Pauli	Undisclosed	(Note: Sobota was on loan from Club Brugge to St. Pauli since the winter 2014–15 transfer window. All parties agreed to make the move permanent.)
March 21, 2016	Kenneth Van Goethem	OH Leuven	Aarschot	Undisclosed	(Note: Van Goethem was on loan from OH Leuven to Heist, the loan ended and Van Goethem left for Aarschot.)
March 30, 2016	David Destorme	Waasland-Beveren	Retired	NA	

=== April 2016 ===
Date	Name	Moving from	Moving to	Fee	Note
April 4, 2016	Nils Schouterden	Westerlo	Mechelen	Free	
April 5, 2016	Niels De Schutter	Oostende	Waasland-Beveren	Free	
April 6, 2016	Lucas Damblon	Sprimont Comblain	Sint-Truiden	Undisclosed	
April 7, 2016	Idrissa Doumbia	Bingerville	Anderlecht	Undisclosed	
April 7, 2016	Tars Notteboom	Lokeren	Gent-Zeehaven	Undisclosed	
April 10, 2016	Jentl Gaethofs	Genk	Lommel United	Undisclosed	(Note: Gaethofs was already on loan from Genk to Lommel United since the summer of 2014. The deal was now made permanent)
April 12, 2016	Wolke Janssens	Dessel Sport	Sint-Truiden	Undisclosed	
April 15, 2016	Jeff Callebaut	Gent	Mechelen	Free	
April 26, 2016	Alessandro Cerigioni	OH Leuven	Waasland-Beveren	Undisclosed	
April 27, 2016	Louis Coetsier	Zulte Waregem	Deinze	Undisclosed	
April 29, 2016	Giannis Maniatis	Standard Liège	Olympiacos	Loan Terminated	(Note: The loan deals of Maniatis and Valdés were terminated early as Standard Liège opted to only use youngsters for the remainder of the season. Both players were therefore allowed to already return to their original club.)
April 29, 2016	Víctor Valdés	Standard Liège	Manchester United	Loan Terminated	
April 30, 2016	Rudy Camacho	Sedan	Waasland-Beveren	Free	

=== May 2016 ===
Date	Name	Moving from	Moving to	Fee	Note
May 4, 2016	Nicolas Orye	Patro Eisden Maasmechelen	Waasland-Beveren	Undisclosed	
May 6, 2016	Jens Cools	Westerlo	Waasland-Beveren	Free	
May 6, 2016	Noël Soumah	WS Bruxelles	Gent	Undisclosed	
May 8, 2016	Akram Afif	Eupen	Al Sadd	Loan Return	(Note: Afif was on loan from Eupen to Al Sadd since the beginning of 2015. The news was announced that Afif had signed for Villarreal, thereby ending the loan deal.)
May 8, 2016	Hamdi Harbaoui	Lokeren	Udinese	Undisclosed	
May 11, 2016	Farouk Miya	Vipers	Standard Liège	Undisclosed	(Note: Miya was already on loan from Vipers to Standard Liège, with the latter club now choosing to use the buy option to make the move permanent.)
May 17, 2016	Mathias Schils	Sint-Truiden	Lommel United	Free	
May 18, 2016	Stef Peeters	MVV Maastricht	Sint-Truiden	Undisclosed	
May 19, 2016	Mathias Bossaerts	Manchester City	Oostende	Undisclosed	
May 20, 2016	Yohan Croizet	OH Leuven	Mechelen	Undisclosed	
May 20, 2016	Sofiane Hanni	Mechelen	Anderlecht	Undisclosed	
May 22, 2016	Alessio Carlone	Genk	Den Bosch	Loan	(Note: Carlone was already on loan from Genk to Den Bosch, with the latter club now choosing to use the option to extend the loan for another season.)
May 24, 2016	Alessandro Ciranni	Genk	MVV Maastricht	Undisclosed	(Note: Ciranni was already on loan from Genk to MVV and the move was now made permanent.)
May 26, 2016	Joseph Biersard	Patro Eisden Maasmechelen	Eupen	Undisclosed	
May 26, 2016	Michaël Lallemand	Kortrijk	Antwerp	Loan	
May 26, 2016	Glenn Leemans	Waasland-Beveren	Deinze	Loan	
May 26, 2016	Jordy Verstraeten	Zulte Waregem	Antwerp	Undisclosed	
May 27, 2016	Davy De fauw	Club Brugge	Zulte Waregem	Undisclosed	
May 27, 2016	Baptiste Ulens	Kortrijk	La Louvière	Undisclosed	(Note: Ulens was on loan from Kortrijk to Tubize. The loan ended and now Ulens was sold to La Louvière.)
May 29, 2016	Marko Maletić	Excelsior	Lommel United	Undisclosed	
May 31, 2016	Anthony Cabeke	Union SG	RWDM47	Free	
May 31, 2016	Rik Impens	Gent	Hamme	Undisclosed	(Note: Impens was on loan from Gent to Roeselare. The loan ended and now Impens was sold to Hamme.)

=== End of 2015–16 season ===
After the end of the 2015–16 season, several players will return from loan to another club or will not have their contracts extended. These will be listed here when the date is otherwise not specified.

Date	Name	Moving from	Moving to	Fee	Note
End of 2015-16 season	Besart Abdurahimi	Astana	Lokeren	Loan Return	
End of 2015-16 season	Mikel Agu	Club Brugge	Porto	Loan Return	
End of 2015-16 season	Allan	Sint-Truiden	Liverpool	Loan Return	
End of 2015-16 season	Eugene Ansah	Lommel United	Lokeren	Loan Return	
End of 2015-16 season	Samuel Asamoah	OH Leuven	Eupen	Loan Return	
End of 2015-16 season	Mushaga Bakenga	Molde	Club Brugge	Loan Return	
End of 2015-16 season	Samuel Bastien	Avellino	Anderlecht	Loan Return	
End of 2015-16 season	Sinan Bolat	Club Brugge	Porto	Loan Return	
End of 2015-16 season	Gabriel Boschilia	Standard Liège	Monaco	Loan Return	
End of 2015-16 season	Axel Bossekota	Seraing United	Cercle Brugge	Loan Return	
End of 2015-16 season	Mbark Boussoufa	Gent	Lokomotiv Moscow	Loan Return	
End of 2015-16 season	Simon Bracke	ASV Geel	OH Leuven	Loan Return	
End of 2015-16 season	Yohan Brouckaert	Roeselare	OH Leuven	Loan Return	
End of 2015-16 season	Christian Brüls	Standard Liège	Rennes	Loan Return	
End of 2015-16 season	Alexander Büttner	Anderlecht	Dynamo Moscow	Loan Return	
End of 2015-16 season	Jean Calvé	OH Leuven	Free Agent	Released	
End of 2015-16 season	Jean-Charles Castelletto	Mouscron	Club Brugge	Loan Return	
End of 2015-16 season	Aleksandar Čavrić	AGF	Genk	Loan Return	
End of 2015-16 season	Sekou Cissé	Sochaux	Genk	Loan Return	
End of 2015-16 season	Cristián Cuevas	Sint-Truiden	Chelsea	Loan Return	
End of 2015-16 season	Romain Davigny	Antwerp	Free Agent	Released	
End of 2015-16 season	Dylan De Belder	Lommel United	Waasland-Beveren	Loan Return	
End of 2015-16 season	Wim De Decker	Antwerp	Free Agent	Released	
End of 2015-16 season	Médéric Deher	Tubize	Metz	Loan Return	
End of 2015-16 season	Sven De Rechter	Roeselare	Sint-Eloois-Winkel	End of Contract	
End of 2015-16 season	Steve De Ridder	Zulte Waregem	Copenhagen	Loan Return	
End of 2015-16 season	Karel D'Haene	Zulte Waregem	Free Agent	Retired	
End of 2015-16 season	Sokratis Dioudis	Panionios	Club Brugge	Loan Return	
End of 2015-16 season	Filip Đuričić	Anderlecht	Benfica	Loan Return	
End of 2015-16 season	Charni Ekangamene	OH Leuven	Zulte Waregem	Loan Return	
End of 2015-16 season	Imoh Ezekiel	Anderlecht	Al-Arabi	Loan Return	
End of 2015-16 season	Mamadou Fall	WS Bruxelles	Charleroi	Loan Return	
End of 2015-16 season	Jean-François Gillet	Mechelen	Catania	Loan Return	
End of 2015-16 season	Cédric Guiro	La Louvière	Union SG	Loan Return	
End of 2015-16 season	Mehdi Haddadou	Union SG	Sint-Truiden	Loan Return	
End of 2015-16 season	Irfan Hadžić	Hamme	Antwerp	Loan Return	
End of 2015-16 season	Nathan Kabasele	De Graafschap	Anderlecht	Loan Return	
End of 2015-16 season	Ronald Kampamba	Lierse	Wadi Degla	Loan Return	
End of 2015-16 season	Andy Kawaya	Willem II	Anderlecht	Loan Return	
End of 2015-16 season	Rodgers Kola	Veria	Gent	Loan Return	
End of 2015-16 season	François Kompany	Roeselare	Free Agent	Released	
End of 2015-16 season	Jasper Maerten	Roeselare	Gullegem	End of Contract	
End of 2015-16 season	François Marquet	Mouscron	Standard Liège	Loan Return	
End of 2015-16 season	Yannis Mbombo	Sochaux	Standard Liège	Loan Return	
End of 2015-16 season	Albian Muzaqi	ASV Geel	Genk	Loan Return	
End of 2015-16 season	Anele Ngcongca	Troyes	Genk	Loan Return	
End of 2015-16 season	Kim Ojo	OH Leuven	Free Agent	Released	
End of 2015-16 season	Tornike Okriashvili	Eskişehirspor	Genk	Loan Return	
End of 2015-16 season	Mustapha Oussalah	Mouscron	Gent	Loan Return	
End of 2015-16 season	William Owusu	Roeselare	Antwerp	Loan Return	
End of 2015-16 season	Alpaslan Öztürk	Eskişehirspor	Standard Liège	Loan Return	
End of 2015-16 season	Jérémy Perbet	Charleroi	İstanbul Başakşehir	Loan Return	
End of 2015-16 season	Marko Poletanović	Zulte Waregem	Gent	Loan Return	
End of 2015-16 season	Vincent Provoost	Roeselare	Zwevezele	End of Contract	
End of 2015-16 season	Ante Puljić	Dinamo Bucharest	Gent	Loan Return	
End of 2015-16 season	Rafinha	Gent	Free Agent	End of Contract	
End of 2015-16 season	Benito Raman	Sint-Truiden	Gent	Loan Return	
End of 2015-16 season	Yannick Reuten	ASV Geel	Club Brugge	Loan Return	
End of 2015-16 season	Fayçal Rherras	Sint-Truiden	Free Agent	End of Contract	
End of 2015-16 season	Rudy Riou	OH Leuven	Free Agent	Released	
End of 2015-16 season	Joao Rodríguez	Sint-Truiden	Chelsea	Loan Return	
End of 2015-16 season	Valērijs Šabala	Příbram	Club Brugge	Loan Return	
End of 2015-16 season	Alexis Scholl	Gent	Benfica B	Loan Return	
End of 2015-16 season	Lucas Schoofs	Lommel United	Gent	Loan Return	
End of 2015-16 season	Dylan Seys	Hapoel Acre	Club Brugge	Loan Return	
End of 2015-16 season	Nikola Storm	Zulte Waregem	Club Brugge	Loan Return	
End of 2015-16 season	Serge Tabekou	Sedan	Gent	Loan Return	
End of 2015-16 season	Mame Thiam	Zulte Waregem	Juventus	Loan Return	
End of 2015-16 season	Leandro Trossard	OH Leuven	Genk	Loan Return	
End of 2015-16 season	Slobodan Urošević	OH Leuven	Napredak Kruševac	Loan Return	
End of 2015-16 season	Jari Vandeputte	FC Eindhoven	Gent	Loan Return	
End of 2015-16 season	Etien Velikonja	Lierse	Cardiff City	Loan Return	
End of 2015-16 season	Fede Vico	Albacete	Anderlecht	Loan Return	
End of 2015-16 season	Oleksandr Volovyk	OH Leuven	Shakhtar Donetsk	Loan Return	
End of 2015-16 season	Mohamed Yattara	Angers	Standard Liège	Loan Return	
End of 2015-16 season	Nermin Zolotić	Željezničar	Gent	Loan Return	

=== June 2016 ===
Date	Name	Moving from	Moving to	Fee	Note
June 1, 2016	Anthony Di Lallo	Antwerp	Hasselt	Undisclosed	(Note: Di Lallo was on loan from Antwerp to La Louvière, the loan ended and Di Lallo was sold to Hasselt.)
June 1, 2016	Haris Hajradinović	Gent	Haugesund	Loan	(Note: Hajradinović was already on loan from Gent to Haugesund, the loan was extended for another season.)
June 1, 2016	Lukas Lerager	Viborg	Zulte Waregem	Undisclosed	
June 2, 2016	Dylan De Belder	Waasland-Beveren	Lierse	Undisclosed	
June 3, 2016	Pierre-Baptiste Baherlé	Sint-Truiden	Union SG	Free	
June 3, 2016	Aurélien Joachim	WS Bruxelles	Lierse	Undisclosed	
June 3, 2016	Sloan Privat	Gent	Guingamp	Undisclosed	
June 3, 2016	Mike Vanhamel	WS Bruxelles	Lierse	Undisclosed	
June 6, 2016	Jo Coppens	MVV Maastricht	Roeselare	Undisclosed	
June 6, 2016	Samuel Fabris	WS Bruxelles	Cercle Brugge	Undisclosed	
June 6, 2016	Frédéric Frans	Partick Thistle	Lierse	Undisclosed	
June 6, 2016	Brian Hamalainen	Genk	Zulte Waregem	Undisclosed	
June 6, 2016	Quintijn Steelant	Club Brugge	Beerschot Wilrijk	Undisclosed	(Note: Steelant was on loan from Club Brugge to Deinze during the 2015–16 season, the loan ended and Steelant was sold to Beerschot Wilrijk.)
June 7, 2016	Anwar Houmani	Antwerp	Rupel Boom	Undisclosed	
June 7, 2016	Nikola Jambor	Slaven Belupo	Lokeren	Undisclosed	
June 7, 2016	Marten Wilmots	Sint-Truiden	Standard Liège	Undisclosed	
June 7, 2016	Reno Wilmots	Sint-Truiden	Standard Liège	Undisclosed	
June 8, 2016	Salomon Nirisarike	Sint-Truiden	Tubize	Undisclosed	
June 8, 2016	Thibaut Rausin	Mouscron	Tubize	Undisclosed	
June 8, 2016	Joël Sami	Zulte Waregem	Orléans	Undisclosed	
June 9, 2016	Lucas Déaux	Gent	Guingamp	Undisclosed	
June 9, 2016	Timothy Derijck	ADO Den Haag	Zulte Waregem	Free	
June 9, 2016	Michalis Manias	PAS Giannina	Westerlo	Undisclosed	
June 9, 2016	Deni Milošević	Standard Liège	Konyaspor	Undisclosed	(Note: Milošević was on loan from Standard Liège to Waasland-Beveren during the 2015–16 season. The loan ended and Milošević was sold to Konyaspor.)
June 9, 2016	Stefan Mitrović	SC Freiburg	Gent	Undisclosed	(Note: Mitrović was already on loan from Freiburg to Gent during the 2015–16 season, the transfer was now made permanent.)
June 9, 2016	Andy Van Hoof	Antwerp	Rupel Boom	Undisclosed	
June 10, 2016	Ibrahima Cissé	Mechelen	Standard Liège	Undisclosed	
June 10, 2016	Lennert De Smul	Club Brugge	Kortrijk	Undisclosed	
June 10, 2016	Brandon Deville	Lommel United	Seraing United	Undisclosed	
June 10, 2016	Grégory Grisez	WS Bruxelles	Roeselare	Undisclosed	
June 10, 2016	Kenneth Houdret	Charleroi	OH Leuven	Undisclosed	(Note: Houdret was already on loan from Charleroi to OH Leuven during the 2015–16 season, the transfer was now made permanent.)
June 10, 2016	Hervé Matthys	Anderlecht	Westerlo	Loan	(Note: Matthys was already on loan from Anderlecht to Westerlo during the second half of the 2015–16 season, the loan was extended with one season.)
June 10, 2016	Ridwane Mbarki	Londerzeel	Lommel United	Undisclosed	
June 11, 2016	Philippe Liard	Tubize	RWDM47	Undisclosed	
June 11, 2016	Orel Mangala	Anderlecht	Borussia Dortmund	Loan	
June 13, 2016	Kjetil Borry	Roeselare	Waasland-Beveren	Free	
June 13, 2016	Jilke De Coninck	Cercle Brugge	Eendracht Aalst	Undisclosed	(Note: De Coninck was on loan from Cercle Brugge to Torhout during the second half of the 2015–16 season, the loan ended and De Coninck was sold to Eendracht Aalst.)
June 13, 2016	Thomas Kaminski	Anderlecht	Kortrijk	Undisclosed	(Note: Kaminski was on loan from Anderlecht to Copenhagen during the 2015–16 season, the loan ended and Kaminski was sold to Kortrijk.)
June 13, 2016	Ibrahima Seck	Auxerre	Waasland-Beveren	Undisclosed	
June 14, 2016	Randal Oto'o	Braga	Westerlo	Loan	
June 14, 2016	Birama Touré	Nantes	Standard Liège	Undisclosed	
June 15, 2016	Mathias Fixelles	Woluwe-Zaventem	Union SG	Undisclosed	
June 15, 2016	Faysel Kasmi	Omonia	Lierse	Loan Return	
June 15, 2016	Idir Ouali	SC Paderborn 07	Kortrijk	Undisclosed	
June 15, 2016	Silvio Proto	Anderlecht	Oostende	Undisclosed	
June 16, 2016	Dennis Appiah	Caen	Anderlecht	Undisclosed	
June 16, 2016	Jimmy De Jonghe	Club Brugge	Beerschot Wilrijk	Undisclosed	(Note: De Jonghe was already on loan from Club Brugge to Beerschot Wilrijk during the 2015–16 season, the transfer was now made permanent .)
June 16, 2016	Landry Dimata	Standard Liège	Oostende	Undisclosed	
June 16, 2016	Jessy Gálvez López	Charleroi	Cercle Brugge	Undisclosed	
June 16, 2016	Dimitris Kolovos	Olympiacos	Mechelen	Loan	
June 16, 2016	Lucas Pirard	Standard Liège	Sint-Truiden	Undisclosed	(Note: Pirard was on loan from Standard Liège to Lommel United during the 2015–16 season, the loan ended and Pirard was sold to Sint-Truiden.)
June 16, 2016	Jonas Vinck	Hamme	Lierse	Undisclosed	
June 17, 2016	Jason Adesanya	Mechelen	Lommel United	Undisclosed	(Note: Adesanya was on loan from Mechelen to Antwerp during the 2015–16 season, the loan ended and Adesanya was sold to Lommel United.)
June 17, 2016	Sander Coopman	Club Brugge	Zulte Waregem	Loan	
June 17, 2016	Steven De Petter	Mechelen	Sint-Truiden	Undisclosed	
June 17, 2016	Emeric Dudouit	Les Herbiers VF	Tubize	Undisclosed	
June 17, 2016	Martin Milec	Standard Liège	Roda JC	Undisclosed	(Note: Milec was already on loan from Standard Liège to Roda JC since the winter 2015–16 transfer window, the transfer was now made permanent .)
June 17, 2016	Jens Naessens	Mechelen	Zulte Waregem	Loan	(Note: Naessens was on loan from Mechelen to Antwerp since the winter 2015–16 transfer window, the loan ended and Naessens was sold to Zulte Waregem.)
June 17, 2016	Igor Vetokele	Charlton Athletic	Zulte Waregem	Loan	
June 18, 2016	Siebe Schrijvers	Genk	Waasland-Beveren	Loan	(Note: Schrijvers was already on loan from Genk to Waasland-Beveren since the winter 2015–16 transfer window, the loan was extended for another season.)
June 19, 2016	Sheldon Bateau	Mechelen	Krylia Sovetov	Undisclosed	(Note: Bateau was already on loan from Mechelen to Krylia Sovetov during the 2015–16 season, the transfer was now made permanent.)
June 19, 2016	Željko Filipović	Maribor	Mechelen	Undisclosed	
June 20, 2016	Quentin Beunardeau	Nancy	Tubize	Undisclosed	(Note: Beunardeau was already on loan from Nancy to Tubize during the 2015–16 season, the transfer was now made permanent.)
June 20, 2016	Stephen Buyl	Zulte Waregem	Antwerp	Loan	
June 20, 2016	Joãozinho	Braga	Kortrijk	Undisclosed	
June 20, 2016	Fazlı Kocabaş	Union SG	OH Leuven	Undisclosed	
June 20, 2016	Alen Šarić-Hodžić	Zmaj Blato	Mouscron	Undisclosed	
June 20, 2016	Kenny Van Hoevelen	OH Leuven	Eendracht Aalst	Undisclosed	
June 21, 2016	Fahad Al-Abdulrahman	Al Sadd	Eupen	Loan	(Note: Al-Abdulrahman was already on loan from Al Sadd to Eupen during the 2015–16 season, the loan was extended for another season.)
June 21, 2016	Niels Coussement	Oostende	Cercle Brugge	Undisclosed	(Note: Coussement was on loan from Oostende to Roeselare during the 2015–16 season, the loan ended and Coussement was sold to Cercle Brugge.)
June 21, 2016	Alessio Palmeri	Dender EH	Union SG	Undisclosed	
June 21, 2016	Adrien Saussez	Tubize	Union SG	Undisclosed	
June 21, 2016	Yaya Soumahoro	Sint-Truiden	Muangthong United	Undisclosed	
June 21, 2016	Pierrick Valdivia	Lens	Sint-Truiden	Undisclosed	
June 21, 2016	Joachim Van Damme	Mechelen	Free Agent	Released	
June 22, 2016	Grégory Dufer	Antwerp	RFC Liège	Undisclosed	
June 22, 2016	Michiel Jaeken	Dessel Sport	Antwerp	Undisclosed	
June 22, 2016	Dieumerci Ndongala	Charleroi	Gent	Undisclosed	
June 23, 2016	Yohan Brouckaert	OH Leuven	RWDM47	Undisclosed	
June 23, 2016	Samy Kehli	Metz	Roeselare	Undisclosed	
June 23, 2016	Dario Melnjak	Lokeren	Neftchi Baku	Loan	
June 23, 2016	Thibault Moulin	Waasland-Beveren	Legia Warsaw	Undisclosed	
June 23, 2016	Livio Nabab	Waasland-Beveren	Orléans	Undisclosed	
June 23, 2016	José Luis Rodríguez	Chorrillo	Gent	Loan	
June 24, 2016	Esteban Casagolda	Dender EH	OH Leuven	Undisclosed	
June 24, 2016	Ignazio Cocchiere	Union SG	Dender EH	Undisclosed	
June 24, 2016	Tom De Sutter	Bursaspor	Lokeren	Undisclosed	
June 24, 2016	Joey Dujardin	Lokeren	Hamme	Loan	
June 24, 2016	Steve Ryckaert	Gent	Sint-Truiden	Undisclosed	
June 25, 2016	Marko Poletanović	Gent	Red Star Belgrade	Loan	
June 26, 2016	Enis Gavazaj	Gent	Skënderbeu Korçë	Undisclosed	(Note: Gavazaj was on loan from Gent to Roeselare during the 2015–16 season, the loan ended and Gavazaj was sold to Skënderbeu Korçë.)
June 27, 2016	Amr Barakat	Misr Lel-Makkasa	Lierse	Undisclosed	
June 27, 2016	Mohamed Daf	Charleroi	Boavista	Undisclosed	(Note: Daf was on loan from Charleroi to WS Bruxelles during the 2015–16 season, the loan ended and Daf was sold to Boavista.)
June 27, 2016	Yan De Maeyer	Mechelen	Beerschot Wilrijk	Free	
June 27, 2016	Mostafa Galal	Wadi Degla	Lierse	Undisclosed	
June 27, 2016	Jorge Pulido	Albacete	Sint-Truiden	Undisclosed	
June 28, 2016	Simon Diedhiou	Gent	Mouscron	Loan	
June 29, 2016	Sami Lkoutbi	Union SG	Londerzeel	Undisclosed	(Note: Lkoutbi was on loan from Union SG to Racing Mechelen during the second half of the 2015–16 season, the loan ended and Lkoutbi was sold to Londerzeel.)
June 29, 2016	Adam Marušić	Kortrijk	Oostende	Undisclosed	
June 29, 2016	Jérémy Perbet	İstanbul Başakşehir	Gent	Undisclosed	
June 29, 2016	Valērijs Šabala	Club Brugge	DAC Dunajská Streda	Loan	
June 29, 2016	Matz Sels	Gent	Newcastle United	Undisclosed	
June 29, 2016	Paul Van Der Helm	Lierse	Fortuna Sittard	Free	(Note: Van Der Helm was on loan from Lierse to Berchem during the second half of the 2015–16 season, the loan ended and Van Der Helm was released to Fortuna Sittard.)
June 30, 2016	Leandro Pereira	Club Brugge	Palmeiras	Loan	
June 30, 2016	Jordan Remacle	OH Leuven	Antwerp	Undisclosed	
June 30, 2016	Konstantinos Rougalas	OH Leuven	Free Agent	Released	
June 30, 2016	Ben Yagan	Heist	OH Leuven	Undisclosed	

=== July 2016 ===
Date	Name	Moving from	Moving to	Fee	Note
July 1, 2016	Djamel Bakar	Montpellier	Charleroi	Undisclosed	
July 1, 2016	Djené Dakonam	Alcorcón	Sint-Truiden	Undisclosed	
July 1, 2016	Yvan Erichot	Sint-Truiden	Leyton Orient	Free	
July 1, 2016	Frédéric Gounongbe	Westerlo	Cardiff City	Undisclosed	
July 1, 2016	Christian Kabasele	Genk	Watford	Undisclosed	
July 1, 2016	Gilles Lentz	Kortrijk	Cercle Brugge	Loan	
July 1, 2016	Jacob Rinne	Örebro	Gent	Undisclosed	
July 1, 2016	Idriss Saadi	Cardiff City	Kortrijk	Loan	
July 1, 2016	Gjoko Zajkov	Rennes	Charleroi	Undisclosed	(Note: Zajkov was already on loan from Rennes to Charleroi during the 2015–16 season, the transfer was now made permanent.)
July 2, 2016	Irfan Hadžić	Antwerp	Celje	Undisclosed	
July 3, 2016	Thomas Meunier	Club Brugge	Paris Saint-Germain	Undisclosed	
July 3, 2016	Jeroen Simaeys	Krylia Sovetov	OH Leuven	Undisclosed	
July 4, 2016	Tuur Dierckx	Club Brugge	Antwerp	Undisclosed	
July 4, 2016	Jean-François Gillet	Catania	Standard Liège	Undisclosed	
July 4, 2016	Martijn Monteyne	Roda JC	Roeselare	Free	
July 4, 2016	Tomás Pina Isla	Villarreal	Club Brugge	Undisclosed	
July 5, 2016	Issam Al Kamouchi	Lommel United	Hades	Loan	
July 5, 2016	John Bostock	OH Leuven	Lens	Undisclosed	
July 5, 2016	Mehdi Khchab	Racing Mechelen	Cercle Brugge	Undisclosed	
July 6, 2016	Sebastian De Maio	Genoa	Anderlecht	Undisclosed	
July 6, 2016	Vincent Di Stefano	Tubize	Sedan	Undisclosed	
July 6, 2016	Ayub Masika	Genk	Lierse	Undisclosed	(Note: Masika was already on loan from Genk to Lierse since the summer 2014 transfer window, the transfer was now made permanent.)
July 7, 2016	Jorn Brondeel	Lierse	NAC Breda	Loan	
July 7, 2016	Fabien Camus	Troyes	Antwerp	Undisclosed	
July 7, 2016	Cyriel Dessers	Lokeren	NAC Breda	Undisclosed	
July 7, 2016	Sam Valcke	Cercle Brugge	Lommel United	Undisclosed	
July 7, 2016	Nermin Zolotić	Gent	Roeselare	Undisclosed	
July 8, 2016	Stefan Simić	Milan	Mouscron	Loan	
July 8, 2016	Anthony Vanden Borre	Anderlecht	Montpellier	Loan	
July 9, 2016	Emir Kujović	Norrköping	Gent	Undisclosed	
July 9, 2016	Constantinos Laifis	Olympiacos	Standard Liège	Two Season Loan	
July 9, 2016	François Marquet	Standard Liège	Waasland-Beveren	Undisclosed	
July 9, 2016	Denis Odoi	Lokeren	Fulham	Undisclosed	
July 9, 2016	Thomas Wils	Haladás	Lierse	Undisclosed	
July 11, 2016	Chris Bedia	Tours	Charleroi	Undisclosed	
July 11, 2016	Mamadou Sylla	Espanyol	Eupen	Loan	
July 12, 2016	Opoku Ampomah	Mechelen	Waasland-Beveren	Undisclosed	
July 12, 2016	Roman Bezus	Dnipro Dnipropetrovsk	Sint-Truiden	Undisclosed	
July 12, 2016	Mohamed El-Gabbas	Wadi Degla	Lierse	Undisclosed	
July 12, 2016	Romero Regales	OH Leuven	Den Bosch	Undisclosed	
July 12, 2016	Dylan Seys	Club Brugge	Twente	Loan	
July 13, 2016	Marin Jakoliš	Virton	Roeselare	Undisclosed	
July 13, 2016	Romain Métanire	Metz	Kortrijk	Undisclosed	
July 13, 2016	Dylan Ragolle	Roeselare	Beerschot Wilrijk	Undisclosed	
July 14, 2016	Nicolas Rommens	Dessel Sport	Westerlo	Undisclosed	
July 14, 2016	Salimo Sylla	Auxerre	Sint-Truiden	Undisclosed	
July 15, 2016	Igor de Camargo	Genk	APOEL	Undisclosed	
July 15, 2016	Yves De Winter	Sint-Truiden	Roda JC	Undisclosed	
July 15, 2016	Igor Lolo	Free Agent	Westerlo	Free	(Note: Lolo had already arrived in Westerlo during the winter 2015–16 transfer window from Rostov, however due to transfer issues the transfer was only completed now.)
July 16, 2016	Maxime Chanot	Kortrijk	New York City FC	Undisclosed	
July 16, 2016	Kyriakos Mazoulouxis	Aris Thessaloniki	Lierse	Undisclosed	
July 17, 2016	Luka Stojanović	Apollon Limassol	Mouscron	Loan	
July 17, 2016	Ricardo van Rhijn	Ajax	Club Brugge	Undisclosed	
July 18, 2016	Mushaga Bakenga	Club Brugge	Rosenborg	Undisclosed	
July 18, 2016	Jesse Bertrams	Jong PSV	Lommel United	Undisclosed	
July 18, 2016	Alexandre De Bruyn	Anderlecht	Lommel United	Undisclosed	
July 18, 2016	Rafael Galhardo	Anderlecht	Atlético Paranaense	Loan	
July 18, 2016	Raphaël Lecomte	Westerlo	Roeselare	Free	
July 18, 2016	Ari Skúlason	Odense	Lokeren	Undisclosed	
July 18, 2016	Thibaut Van Acker	Cercle Brugge	Roeselare	Undisclosed	
July 19, 2016	Alexandru Chipciu	Steaua Bucharest	Anderlecht	Undisclosed	
July 19, 2016	Jérémy Huyghebaert	WS Bruxelles	Mouscron	Undisclosed	
July 20, 2016	Michaël Cordier	Club Brugge	La Louvière	Free	
July 20, 2016	Ante Puljić	Gent	Tom Tomsk	Free	
July 20, 2016	Serge Tabekou	Gent	OH Leuven	Loan	
July 21, 2016	Elton Acolatse	Jong Ajax	Westerlo	Undisclosed	
July 21, 2016	Eric Lanini	Juventus	Westerlo	Loan	
July 22, 2016	Jean-Charles Castelletto	Club Brugge	Red Star	Loan	
July 22, 2016	Matej Delač	Chelsea	Mouscron	Undisclosed	
July 22, 2016	Bernie Ibini-Isei	Club Brugge	Sydney FC	Loan	
July 22, 2016	Jordan Lukaku	Oostende	Lazio	Undisclosed	
July 22, 2016	Filip Starzyński	Lokeren	Zagłębie Lubin	Undisclosed	(Note: Starzyński was already on loan from Lokeren to Zagłębie Lubin during the second half of the 2015-16 season, the transfer was now made permanent.)
July 22, 2016	Georgy Zhukov	Standard Liège	Ural Yekaterinburg	Undisclosed	(Note: Zhukov was on loan from Standard Liège to Roda JC during the second half of the 2015-16 season, the loan ended and Zhukov was sold to Ural Yekaterinburg.)
July 23, 2016	Aaron Leya Iseka	Anderlecht	Marseille	Loan	
July 23, 2016	Anthony Limbombe	NEC	Club Brugge	Undisclosed	
July 23, 2016	Senne Verbiest	Genk	Lommel United	Loan	
July 24, 2016	Amadou Diallo	WS Bruxelles	Cercle Brugge	Undisclosed	
July 24, 2016	Freddy Mombongo-Dues	Waldhof Mannheim	Union SG	Undisclosed	
July 25, 2016	Lucas Damblon	Sint-Truiden	ASV Geel	Loan	
July 25, 2016	Darren Keet	Kortrijk	Bidvest Wits	Free	
July 26, 2016	Bo Geens	Lokeren	MVV	Loan	
July 26, 2016	(Martinique) Steeven Langil	Waasland-Beveren	Legia Warsaw	Undisclosed	
July 27, 2016	Isaac Mbenza	Valenciennes	Standard Liège	Undisclosed	
July 27, 2016	Obbi Oularé	Watford	Zulte Waregem	Loan	
July 27, 2016	Benito Raman	Gent	Standard Liège	Undisclosed	
July 29, 2016	Sokratis Dioudis	Club Brugge	Aris Thessaloniki	Undisclosed	
July 31, 2016	Cristian Ceballos	Charlton Athletic	Sint-Truiden	Loan	

=== August 2016 ===
Date	Name	Moving from	Moving to	Fee	Note
August 1, 2016	Lilian Bochet	Dudelange	Roeselare	Undisclosed	
August 1, 2016	Silvère Ganvoula	Elazığspor	Westerlo	Undisclosed	
August 1, 2016	Pietro Perdichizzi	Antwerp	Union SG	Free	
August 1, 2016	Yohann Thuram-Ulien	Standard Liège	Le Havre	Undisclosed	
August 2, 2016	Chuks Aneke	Zulte Waregem	MK Dons	Undisclosed	
August 2, 2016	Yoran Chalon	Union SG	Rebecq	Loan	
August 2, 2016	Constant Delsanne	Union SG	RWDM47	Loan	
August 2, 2016	Soufiane El Banouhi	WS Bruxelles	OH Leuven	Undisclosed	
August 2, 2016	Jonathan Kindermans	RKC Waalwijk	OH Leuven	Undisclosed	
August 2, 2016	Jo Nymo Matland	Antwerp	Hasselt	Free	
August 2, 2016	Alhassane Soumah	Juventus	Cercle Brugge	Loan	
August 3, 2016	Cédric D'Ulivo	Zulte Waregem	OH Leuven	Undisclosed	
August 3, 2016	Alan Pires da Graça	Glória	Tubize	Undisclosed	
August 3, 2016	Ivan Santini	Standard Liège	Caen	Undisclosed	
August 4, 2016	Diego Capel	Genoa	Anderlecht	Undisclosed	
August 4, 2016	Nicolás Castillo	Club Brugge	CD Universidad Católica	Loan	(Note: Castillo was already on loan from Club Brugge to CD Universidad Católica during the 2015-16 season, the loan ended but was renewed for another season.)
August 4, 2016	Kévin Koubemba	Lille	Sint-Truiden	Undisclosed	
August 4, 2016	Łukasz Teodorczyk	Dynamo Kyiv	Anderlecht	Loan	
August 5, 2016	Ofir Davidzada	Hapoel Be'er Sheva	Gent	Undisclosed	
August 5, 2016	Cédric Fauré	Antwerp	Union SG	Free	
August 5, 2016	Ibou	Waasland-Beveren	Roeselare	Undisclosed	
August 5, 2016	François Kompany	Free Agent	Roeselare	NA	
August 5, 2016	Steph Van Cauwenberge	Zulte Waregem	Roeselare	Undisclosed	
August 6, 2016	Guus Hupperts	AZ	Lokeren	Undisclosed	
August 6, 2016	Luca Polizzi	Genk	Inter Zaprešić	Free	(Note: Polizzi was on loan from Genk to MVV Maastricht during the previous season. The loan ended and Polizzi was released to Inter Zaprešić.)
August 6, 2016	Matías Suárez	Anderlecht	Belgrano	Undisclosed	(Note: Following disputes with management and fearing for his family's safety following the 2016 terrorist attacks on Brussels, Suárez had already terminated his contract with Anderlecht and signed for Belgrano on July 7, 2016. FIFA formally approved Suárez' reasons for terminating his contract, thereby allowing his move to Belgrano.)
August 7, 2016	Jérémy Taravel	Dinamo Zagreb	Gent	Undisclosed	
August 8, 2016	Laurent Depoitre	Gent	Porto	Undisclosed	
August 8, 2016	Lukas Van Eenoo	Kortrijk	Roeselare	Loan	
August 9, 2016	Mario Babić	Rudar Velenje	Tubize	Undisclosed	
August 9, 2016	Aleksandar Boljević	PSV	Waasland-Beveren	Undisclosed	
August 9, 2016	Tomislav Kiš	Kortrijk	Cercle Brugge	Loan	
August 10, 2016	Iliess Bruylandts	Lierse	RWDM47	Loan	
August 10, 2016	Bojan Nastić	Vojvodina	Genk	Undisclosed	
August 11, 2016	Wouter Biebauw	Oostende	Roeselare	Undisclosed	
August 11, 2016	Nicolas de Préville	Reims	Oostende	Undisclosed	
August 11, 2016	Nicolas de Préville	Oostende	Lille	Loan	
August 11, 2016	Jonathan Mambabua	Gent	Marseille Consolat	Undisclosed	
August 12, 2016	Omar Colley	Djurgårdens IF	Genk	Undisclosed	
August 12, 2016	Steven Defour	Anderlecht	Burnley	Undisclosed	
August 12, 2016	Tibo Van de Velde	Cercle Brugge	FC Eindhoven	Undisclosed	
August 14, 2016	Arno Verschueren	Westerlo	NAC Breda	Undisclosed	
August 16, 2016	Julian Michel	Mouscron	Waasland-Beveren	Undisclosed	
August 16, 2016	Anele Ngcongca	Genk	Free Agent	Contract Terminated	
August 17, 2016	Jonathan Bamba	Saint-Étienne	Sint-Truiden	Loan	
August 17, 2016	Ram Strauss	Poli Timișoara	OH Leuven	Free	
August 18, 2016	Sebastian De Maio	Anderlecht	Fiorentina	Loan	
August 20, 2016	Steve De Ridder	Copenhagen	Lokeren	Undisclosed	
August 21, 2016	Dimitrios Goutas	Olympiacos	Kortrijk	Loan	
August 22, 2016	Paolino Bertaccini	Genk	Cercle Brugge	Loan	
August 23, 2016	Antonijo Ježina	Dinamo Zagreb	Antwerp	Undisclosed	
August 23, 2016	Dennis Praet	Anderlecht	Sampdoria	Undisclosed	
August 23, 2016	Alassane Touré	Gazélec Ajaccio	Tubize	Undisclosed	
August 24, 2016	Daniel Christensen	AGF	Westerlo	Undisclosed	
August 26, 2016	Yoni Buyens	Genk	Westerlo	Loan	
August 26, 2016	Neeskens Kebano	Genk	Fulham	Undisclosed	
August 29, 2016	Stefano Okaka	Anderlecht	Watford	Undisclosed	
August 29, 2016	Nicolae Stanciu	Steaua Bucharest	Anderlecht	Undisclosed	
August 30, 2016	Massimo Bruno	RB Leipzig	Anderlecht	Loan	
August 30, 2016	Hamdi Harbaoui	Udinese	Anderlecht	Undisclosed	
August 30, 2016	Rabiu Ibrahim	Trenčín	Gent	Undisclosed	
August 30, 2016	László Köteles	Genk	Waasland-Beveren	Loan	
August 30, 2016	Sherjill MacDonald	Westerlo	Almere City	Undisclosed	(Note: MacDonals was on loan from Westerlo to Sparta Rotterdam during the previous season. The loan ended and MacDonald was sold to Almere City.)
August 30, 2016	Kingsley Madu	Trenčín	Zulte Waregem	Undisclosed	
August 30, 2016	Luca Marrone	Juventus	Zulte Waregem	Loan	
August 30, 2016	Idrissa Sylla	Anderlecht	Queens Park Rangers	Undisclosed	
August 31, 2016	Farès Bahlouli	Monaco	Standard Liège	Loan	
August 31, 2016	Samy Bourard	Anderlecht	Sint-Truiden	Undisclosed	
August 31, 2016	Jakub Brabec	Sparta Prague	Genk	Undisclosed	
August 31, 2016	Ibrahima Conté	Anderlecht	Oostende	Undisclosed	
August 31, 2016	Cristián Cuevas	Chelsea	Sint-Truiden	Loan	
August 31, 2016	Nathan de Medina	Anderlecht	OH Leuven	Loan	
August 31, 2016	Raphaël Diarra	Monaco	Cercle Brugge	Loan	
August 31, 2016	Elderson Echiéjilé	Monaco	Standard Liège	Loan	
August 31, 2016	Charni Ekangamene	Zulte Waregem	NAC Breda	Loan	
August 31, 2016	Anderson Esiti	Estoril	Gent	Undisclosed	
August 31, 2016	Islam Feruz	Chelsea	Mouscron	Loan	
August 31, 2016	Trezeguet	Anderlecht	Mouscron	Loan	
August 31, 2016	Gaëtan Hendrickx	Sint-Truiden	Charleroi	Free	
August 31, 2016	Michaël Heylen	Anderlecht	Westerlo	Loan	
August 31, 2016	Sébastien Locigno	Oostende	Go Ahead Eagles	Loan	
August 31, 2016	Yannick Loemba	Oostende	OH Leuven	Loan	
August 31, 2016	Dodi Lukebakio	Anderlecht	Toulouse	Loan	
August 31, 2016	Frédéric Maciel	Mouscron	Moreirense	Undisclosed	
August 31, 2016	Wallyson Mallmann	Sporting CP	Standard Liège	Loan	
August 31, 2016	Tornike Okriashvili	Genk	Free Agent	Released	
August 31, 2016	Christian Osaguona	Raja Casablanca	Mechelen	Free	
August 31, 2016	Lucas Rougeaux	Nice	Kortrijk	Undisclosed	
August 31, 2016	Orlando Sá	Maccabi Tel Aviv	Standard Liège	Undisclosed	
August 31, 2016	Uroš Spajić	Toulouse	Anderlecht	Loan	
August 31, 2016	Andriy Totovytskyi	Shakhtar Donetsk	Kortrijk	Loan	
August 31, 2016	Lars Veldwijk	Nottingham Forest	Kortrijk	Undisclosed	
August 31, 2016	Eduards Višņakovs	Westerlo	Ruch Chorzów	Loan	
August 31, 2016	Gustav Wikheim	Gent	Midtjylland	Loan	

=== September 2016 ===
Date	Name	Moving from	Moving to	Fee	Note
September 6, 2016	Rodgers Kola	Gent	Hapoel Ra'anana	Loan	
September 7, 2016	Aleksandar Čavrić	Genk	Slovan Bratislava	Free	(Note: Čavrić was on loan from Genk to AGF during the 2015–16 season. The loan ended and Čavrić was released to Slovan Bratislava.)
September 7, 2016	Benjamin Tetteh	Standard Liège	Slovácko	Loan	

== Sorted by team ==
=== Belgian First Division A teams ===
==== Anderlecht ====
In:

No.	Pos.	Nation	Player
5	FW	SRB	Uroš Spajić (on loan from Toulouse)
9	FW	TUN	Hamdi Harbaoui (from Udinese)
10	MF	BEL	Massimo Bruno (on loan from RB Leipzig)
11	MF	ROU	Alexandru Chipciu (from Steaua Bucharest)
12	DF	FRA	Dennis Appiah (from Caen)
17	MF	ESP	Diego Capel (from Genoa)
22	MF	CIV	Idrissa Doumbia (from Bingerville)
47	MF	BEL	Andy Kawaya (loan return from Willem II)
73	FW	ROU	Nicolae Stanciu (from Steaua Bucharest)
77	FW	BEL	Nathan Kabasele (loan return from De Graafschap)
91	FW	POL	Łukasz Teodorczyk (on loan from Dynamo Kyiv)
94	MF	ALG	Sofiane Hanni (from Mechelen)
—	MF	BEL	Samuel Bastien (loan return from Avellino)
—	MF	ESP	Fede Vico (loan return from Albacete)

Out:

No.	Pos.	Nation	Player
1	GK	BEL	Silvio Proto (to Oostende)
2	DF	BRA	Rafael Galhardo (on loan to Atlético Paranaense)
5	DF	FRA	Sebastian De Maio (signed from Genoa, then loaned to Fiorentina)
9	FW	ARG	Matías Suárez (to Belgrano)
10	MF	BEL	Dennis Praet (to Sampdoria)
11	MF	SRB	Filip Đuričić (loan return to Benfica)
16	MF	BEL	Steven Defour (to Burnley)
20	MF	GUI	Ibrahima Conté (to Oostende)
24	DF	BEL	Michaël Heylen (on loan to Westerlo)
26	FW	GUI	Idrissa Sylla (to Queens Park Rangers)
27	MF	EGY	Trezeguet (was on loan from Al Ahly, now bought and loaned to Mouscron)
28	DF	NED	Alexander Büttner (loan return to Dynamo Moscow)
39	MF	BEL	Anthony Vanden Borre (on loan to Montpellier)
93	FW	NGR	Imoh Ezekiel (loan return to Al-Arabi)
97	MF	BEL	Dodi Lukebakio (on loan to Toulouse)
99	FW	ITA	Stefano Okaka (to Watford)
—	MF	BEL	Samy Bourard (to Sint-Truiden)
—	FW	BEL	Alexandre De Bruyn (to Lommel United)
—	DF	BEL	Nathan de Medina (on loan to OH Leuven)
—	GK	BEL	Thomas Kaminski (was on loan to Copenhagen, now sold to Kortrijk)
—	FW	BEL	Aaron Leya Iseka (on loan to Marseille)
—	MF	BEL	Orel Mangala (on loan to Borussia Dortmund)
—	DF	BEL	Hervé Matthys (again on loan to Westerlo)

==== Charleroi ====
In:

No.	Pos.	Nation	Player
6	DF	MKD	Gjoko Zajkov (was on loan from Rennes, now bought)
—	MF	COM	Djamel Bakar (from Montpellier)
—	FW	CIV	Chris Bedia (from Tours)
—	FW	SEN	Mamadou Fall (loan return from WS Bruxelles)
—	MF	BEL	Gaëtan Hendrickx (from Sint-Truiden)

Out:

No.	Pos.	Nation	Player
20	MF	BEL	Jessy Gálvez López (to Cercle Brugge)
21	FW	FRA	Jérémy Perbet (loan return to İstanbul Başakşehir)
80	MF	BEL	Kenneth Houdret (was on loan to OH Leuven, now sold)
88	MF	COD	Dieumerci Ndongala (to Gent)
—	MF	SEN	Mohamed Daf (was on loan to WS Bruxelles, now sold to Boavista)
—	DF	BEL	Guillaume François (to KFCO Beerschoot)

==== Club Brugge ====
In:

No.	Pos.	Nation	Player
2	DF	NED	Ricardo van Rhijn (from Ajax)
15	MF	ESP	Tomás Pina (from Villarreal)
17	FW	BEL	Anthony Limbombe (from NEC)
42	MF	BEL	Nikola Storm (loan return from Zulte Waregem)
—	MF	BEL	Yannick Reuten (loan return from ASV Geel)

Out:

No.	Pos.	Nation	Player
2	DF	BEL	Davy De fauw (to Zulte Waregem)
11	FW	AUS	Bernie Ibini-Isei (on loan to Sydney FC)
17	FW	BRA	Leandro Pereira (on loan to Palmeiras)
19	DF	BEL	Thomas Meunier (to Paris Saint-Germain)
27	GK	BEL	Michaël Cordier (to La Louvière)
30	MF	NGR	Mikel Agu (loan return to Porto)
38	GK	TUR	Sinan Bolat (loan return to Porto)
43	MF	BEL	Sander Coopman (on loan to Zulte Waregem)
45	DF	BEL	Lennert De Smul (to Kortrijk)
55	FW	BEL	Tuur Dierckx (to Antwerp)
—	FW	NOR	Mushaga Bakenga (was on loan to Molde, now sold to Rosenborg)
—	DF	FRA	Jean-Charles Castelletto (was on loan to Mouscron, now loaned to Red Star)
—	FW	CHI	Nicolás Castillo (again on loan to CD Universidad Católica)
—	MF	BEL	Jimmy De Jonghe (was on loan to Beerschot Wilrijk, now sold)
—	GK	GRE	Sokratis Dioudis (was on loan to Panionios, now sold to Aris Thessaloniki)
—	FW	LAT	Valērijs Šabala (was on loan to Příbram, now loaned to DAC Dunajská Streda)
—	MF	BEL	Dylan Seys (was on loan to Hapoel Acre, now loaned to Twente)
—	MF	POL	Waldemar Sobota (was on loan to St. Pauli, now sold)
—	GK	BEL	Quintijn Steelant (was on loan to Deinze, now sold to Beerschot Wilrijk)

==== Eupen ====
In:

No.	Pos.	Nation	Player
3	DF	QAT	Fahad Al-Abdulrahman (again on loan from Al Sadd)
—	MF	GHA	Samuel Asamoah (loan return from OH Leuven)
—	GK	BEL	Joseph Biersard (from Patro Eisden Maasmechelen)
—	FW	SEN	Mamadou Sylla (on loan from Espanyol)

Out:

No.	Pos.	Nation	Player
87	FW	QAT	Akram Afif (loan return to Al Sadd)

==== Genk ====
In:

No.	Pos.	Nation	Player
2	DF	CZE	Jakub Brabec (from Sparta Prague)
—	FW	CIV	Sekou Cissé (loan return from Sochaux)
—	DF	GAM	Omar Colley (from Djurgårdens IF)
—	FW	NED	Albian Muzaqi (loan return from ASV Geel)
—	DF	SRB	Bojan Nastić (from Vojvodina)
—	MF	BEL	Leandro Trossard (loan return from OH Leuven)
—	GK	AUS	Mathew Ryan (on loan from Valencia)

Out:

No.	Pos.	Nation	Player
4	DF	DEN	Brian Hamalainen (to Zulte Waregem)
11	FW	BEL	Igor de Camargo (to APOEL)
26	GK	HUN	László Köteles (on loan to Waasland-Beveren)
27	DF	BEL	Christian Kabasele (to Watford)
71	MF	BEL	Yoni Buyens (on loan to Westerlo)
92	MF	COD	Neeskens Kebano (to Fulham)
—	MF	BEL	Paolino Bertaccini (on loan to Cercle Brugge)
—	FW	BEL	Alessio Carlone (again on loan to Den Bosch)
—	FW	SRB	Aleksandar Čavrić (was on loan to AGF, now released to Slovan Bratislava)
—	DF	BEL	Alessandro Ciranni (was on loan to MVV Maastricht, now sold)
—	MF	BEL	Jentl Gaethofs (was on loan to Lommel United, now sold)
—	MF	KEN	Ayub Masika (was on loan to Lierse, now sold)
—	DF	RSA	Anele Ngcongca (was on loan to Troyes, then released)
—	MF	GEO	Tornike Okriashvili (was on loan to Eskişehirspor, then released)
—	MF	BEL	Luca Polizzi (was on loan to MVV Maastricht, now released to Inter Zaprešić)
—	FW	BEL	Siebe Schrijvers (again on loan to Waasland-Beveren)
—	MF	BEL	Senne Verbiest (on loan to Lommel United)

==== Gent ====
In:

No.	Pos.	Nation	Player
1	GK	SWE	Jacob Rinne (from Örebro)
4	DF	SEN	Noël Soumah (from WS Bruxelles)
11	FW	SWE	Emir Kujović (from Norrköping)
12	MF	BEL	Lucas Schoofs (loan return from Lommel United)
13	DF	SRB	Stefan Mitrović (was already on loan from SC Freiburg, now bought)
24	FW	FRA	Jérémy Perbet (from İstanbul Başakşehir)
88	MF	COD	Dieumerci Ndongala (from Charleroi)
—	DF	ISR	Ofir Davidzada (from Hapoel Be'er Sheva)
—	MF	NGR	Anderson Esiti (from Estoril)
—	MF	NGR	Rabiu Ibrahim (from Trenčín)
—	MF	MAR	Mustapha Oussalah (loan return from Mouscron)
—	MF	PAN	José Luis Rodríguez (on loan from Chorrillo)
—	DF	FRA	Jérémy Taravel (from Dinamo Zagreb)
—	MF	BEL	Jari Vandeputte (loan return from FC Eindhoven)

Out:

No.	Pos.	Nation	Player
1	GK	BEL	Matz Sels (to Newcastle United)
4	DF	BRA	Rafinha (end of contract)
6	MF	MAR	Mbark Boussoufa (loan return to Lokomotiv Moscow)
9	FW	BEL	Laurent Depoitre (to Porto)
11	FW	SEN	Simon Diedhiou (on loan to Mouscron)
18	MF	FRA	Lucas Déaux (to Guingamp)
—	MF	BEL	Jeff Callebout (to Mechelen)
—	MF	BIH	Haris Hajradinović (again on loan to Haugesund)
—	MF	ALB	Enis Gavazaj (was on loan to Roeselare, now sold to Skënderbeu Korçë)
—	MF	BEL	Rik Impens (was on loan to Roeselare, now sold to Hamme)
—	FW	ZAM	Rodgers Kola (was on loan to Veria, now loaned to Hapoel Ra'anana)
—	DF	BEL	Jonathan Mambabua (to Marseille Consolat)
—	MF	SRB	Marko Poletanović (was on loan to Zulte Waregem, now loaned to Red Star Belgrade)
—	FW	GUF	Sloan Privat (was on loan to Guingamp, now sold)
—	DF	CRO	Ante Puljić (was on loan to Dinamo Bucharest, now released to Tom Tomsk)
—	MF	BEL	Benito Raman (was on loan to Sint-Truiden, now sold to Standard Liège)
—	DF	BEL	Steve Ryckaert (to Sint-Truiden)
—	DF	BEL	Alexis Scholl (loan return to Benfica B)
—	FW	CMR	Serge Tabekou (was on loan to Sedan, now loaned to OH Leuven)
—	DF	NOR	Gustav Wikheim (on loan to Midtjylland)
—	MF	BIH	Nermin Zolotić (was on loan to Željezničar, now sold to Roeselare)

==== Kortrijk ====
In:

No.	Pos.	Nation	Player
—	DF	CRO	Tomislav Barbarić (from Sarajevo)
—	DF	BEL	Lennert De Smul (from Club Brugge)
—	DF	GRE	Dimitrios Goutas (on loan from Olympiacos)
—	DF	POR	Joãozinho (from Braga)
—	GK	BEL	Thomas Kaminski (from Anderlecht)
—	DF	FRA	Romain Métanire (from Metz)
—	MF	ALG	Idir Ouali (from SC Paderborn 07)
—	DF	FRA	Lucas Rougeaux (from Nice)
—	FW	FRA	Idriss Saadi (on loan from Cardiff City)
—	MF	UKR	Andriy Totovytskyi (on loan from Shakhtar Donetsk)
—	FW	NED	Lars Veldwijk (from Nottingham Forest)

Out:

No.	Pos.	Nation	Player
2	DF	LUX	Maxime Chanot (to New York City FC)
11	DF	MNE	Adam Marušić (to Oostende)
12	MF	BEL	Lukas Van Eenoo (on loan to Roeselare)
16	GK	RSA	Darren Keet (to Bidvest Wits)
22	FW	BEL	Michaël Lallemand (on loan to Antwerp)
23	MF	BEL	Baptiste Ulens (was on loan to Tubize, now sold to La Louvière)
27	GK	BEL	Gilles Lentz (on loan to Cercle Brugge)
33	DF	MNE	Žarko Tomašević (to Oostende)
44	FW	CRO	Tomislav Kiš (on loan to Cercle Brugge)

==== Lokeren ====
In:

No.	Pos.	Nation	Player
6	DF	ISL	Ari Skúlason (from Odense)
—	MF	MKD	Besart Abdurahimi (loan return from Astana)
—	MF	GHA	Eugene Ansah (loan return from Lommel United)
—	MF	BEL	Steve De Ridder (from Copenhagen)
—	FW	BEL	Tom De Sutter (from Bursaspor)
—	MF	NED	Guus Hupperts (from AZ)
—	MF	CRO	Nikola Jambor (from Slaven Belupo)

Out:

No.	Pos.	Nation	Player
2	DF	BEL	Joey Dujardin (on loan to Hamme)
3	DF	BEL	Denis Odoi (to Fulham)
9	FW	TUN	Hamdi Harbaoui (to Udinese)
17	FW	BEL	Cyriel Dessers (to NAC Breda)
22	DF	CRO	Dario Melnjak (on loan to Neftchi Baku)
27	MF	BEL	Tars Notteboom (to Gent-Zeehaven)
39	GK	BEL	Bo Geens (on loan to MVV)
—	MF	POL	Filip Starzyński (was on loan to Zagłębie Lubin, now sold)

==== Mechelen ====
In:

No.	Pos.	Nation	Player
—	MF	BEL	Jeff Callebout (from Gent)
—	MF	FRA	Yohan Croizet (from OH Leuven)
—	MF	SLO	Željko Filipović (from Maribor)
—	MF	GRE	Dimitris Kolovos (on loan from Olympiacos)
—	FW	NGR	Christian Osaguona (from Raja Casablanca)
—	MF	BEL	Nils Schouterden (from Westerlo)

Out:

No.	Pos.	Nation	Player
1	GK	BEL	Jean-François Gillet (loan return to Catania)
12	MF	BEL	Steven De Petter (to Sint-Truiden)
20	MF	BEL	Joachim Van Damme (released)
44	DF	BEL	Ibrahima Cissé (to Standard Liège)
94	MF	ALG	Sofiane Hanni (to Anderlecht)
—	FW	BEL	Jason Adesanya (was on loan to Antwerp, now sold to Lommel United)
—	MF	GHA	Opoku Ampomah (to Waasland-Beveren)
—	MF	TTO	Sheldon Bateau (was on loan to Krylia Sovetov, now sold)
—	FW	BEL	Jens Naessens (was on loan to Antwerp, now sold to Zulte Waregem)

==== Mouscron ====
In:

No.	Pos.	Nation	Player
20	FW	SEN	Simon Diedhiou (on loan from Gent)
28	DF	BEL	Jérémy Huyghebaert (from WS Bruxelles)
22	MF	SRB	Luka Stojanović (on loan from Apollon Limassol)
34	DF	CZE	Stefan Simić (on loan from Milan)
—	GK	CRO	Matej Delač (on loan from Chelsea)
—	FW	SCO	Islam Feruz (on loan from Chelsea)
—	MF	EGY	Trezeguet (on loan from Anderlecht)
—	GK	CRO	Alen Šarić-Hodžić (from Zmaj Blato)

Out:

No.	Pos.	Nation	Player
8	MF	BEL	François Marquet (loan return to Standard Liège)
10	MF	FRA	Julian Michel (to Waasland-Beveren)
15	DF	FRA	Jean-Charles Castelletto (loan return to Club Brugge)
24	GK	BEL	Thibaut Rausin (to Tubize)
25	MF	MAR	Mustapha Oussalah (loan return to Gent)
27	FW	POR	Frédéric Maciel (to Moreirense)

==== Oostende ====
In:

No.	Pos.	Nation	Player
—	DF	BEL	Mathias Bossaerts (from Manchester City)
—	MF	GUI	Ibrahima Conté (from Anderlecht)
—	FW	BEL	Landry Dimata (from Standard Liège)
—	DF	MNE	Adam Marušić (from Kortrijk)
—	GK	BEL	Silvio Proto (from Anderlecht)
—	DF	MNE	Žarko Tomašević (from Kortrijk)

Out:

No.	Pos.	Nation	Player
3	MF	BEL	Niels De Schutter (to Waasland-Beveren)
5	DF	BEL	Jordan Lukaku (to Lazio)
22	DF	BEL	Sébastien Locigno (on loan to Go Ahead Eagles)
25	GK	BEL	Wouter Biebauw (to Roeselare)
90	MF	BEL	Yannick Loemba (on loan to OH Leuven)
—	MF	BEL	Niels Coussement (was on loan to Roeselare, now sold to Cercle Brugge)
—	FW	FRA	Nicolas de Préville (signed from Reims, but immediately loaned to Lille)

==== Sint-Truiden ====
In:

No.	Pos.	Nation	Player
—	MF	FRA	Jonathan Bamba (on loan from Saint-Étienne)
—	FW	UKR	Roman Bezus (from Dnipro Dnipropetrovsk)
—	MF	BEL	Samy Bourard (from Anderlecht)
—	MF	ESP	Cristian Ceballos (on loan from Charlton Athletic)
—	MF	CHI	Cristián Cuevas (again on loan from Chelsea)
—	DF	TOG	Djené Dakonam (from Alcorcón)
—	MF	BEL	Steven De Petter (from Mechelen)
—	MF	FRA	Mehdi Haddadou (loan return from Union SG)
—	MF	BEL	Wolke Janssens (from Dessel Sport)
—	FW	CGO	Kévin Koubemba (from Lille)
—	MF	BEL	Stef Peeters (from MVV Maastricht)
—	GK	BEL	Lucas Pirard (from Standard Liège)
—	DF	ESP	Jorge Pulido (from Albacete)
—	DF	BEL	Steve Ryckaert (from Gent)
—	DF	FRA	Salimo Sylla (from Auxerre)
—	MF	FRA	Pierrick Valdivia (from Lens)

Out:

No.	Pos.	Nation	Player
1	GK	BEL	Yves De Winter (to Roda JC)
6	MF	BEL	Gaëtan Hendrickx (to Charleroi)
8	DF	MAR	Fayçal Rherras (end of contract)
9	MF	BEL	Benito Raman (loan return to Gent)
12	FW	CIV	Yaya Soumahoro (to Muangthong United)
19	DF	FRA	Yvan Erichot (to Leyton Orient)
21	DF	BEL	Mathias Schils (to Lommel United)
22	MF	BRA	Allan (loan return to Liverpool)
24	DF	RWA	Salomon Nirisarike (to Tubize)
27	FW	BEL	Reno Wilmots (to Standard Liège)
30	FW	COL	Joao Rodríguez (loan return to Chelsea)
—	MF	FRA	Pierre-Baptiste Baherlé (to Union SG)
—	FW	BEL	Lucas Damblon (signed from Sprimont Comblain, then loaned to ASV Geel)
—	MF	BEL	Marten Wilmots (to Standard Liège)

==== Standard Liège ====
In:

No.	Pos.	Nation	Player
15	MF	UGA	Farouk Miya (was on loan from Vipers, now bought)
—	MF	FRA	Farès Bahlouli (on loan from Monaco)
—	DF	BEL	Ibrahima Cissé (from Mechelen)
—	DF	NGR	Elderson Echiéjilé (on loan from Monaco)
—	GK	BEL	Jean-François Gillet (from Catania)
—	DF	CYP	Constantinos Laifis (on loan from Olympiacos)
—	MF	BRA	Wallyson Mallmann (on loan from Sporting CP)
—	FW	BEL	Isaac Mbenza (from Valenciennes)
—	FW	BEL	Yannis Mbombo (loan return from Sochaux)
—	MF	TUR	Alpaslan Öztürk (loan return from Eskişehirspor)
—	MF	BEL	Benito Raman (from Gent)
—	FW	POR	Orlando Sá (from Maccabi Tel Aviv)
—	MF	MLI	Birama Touré (from Nantes)
—	MF	BEL	Marten Wilmots (from Sint-Truiden)
—	FW	BEL	Reno Wilmots (from Sint-Truiden)
—	FW	GUI	Mohamed Yattara (loan return from Angers)

Out:

No.	Pos.	Nation	Player
1	GK	ESP	Víctor Valdés (loan return to Manchester United)
6	MF	SLO	Martin Milec (was on loan to Roda JC, now sold)
7	MF	GRE	Giannis Maniatis (loan return to Olympiacos)
8	MF	BRA	Gabriel Boschilia (loan return to Monaco)
14	MF	BEL	Christian Brüls (loan return to Rennes)
16	GK	GLP	Yohann Thuram-Ulien (to Le Havre)
18	FW	CRO	Ivan Santini (to Caen)
—	FW	BEL	Landry Dimata (to Oostende)
—	MF	BEL	François Marquet (was on loan to Mouscron, now sold to Waasland-Beveren)
—	MF	BIH	Deni Milošević (was on loan to Waasland-Beveren, now sold to Konyaspor)
—	GK	BEL	Lucas Pirard (was on loan to Lommel United, now sold to Sint-Truiden)
—	FW	GHA	Benjamin Tetteh (on loan to Slovácko)
—	MF	KAZ	Georgy Zhukov (was on loan to Roda JC, now sold to Ural Yekaterinburg)

==== Waasland-Beveren ====
In:

No.	Pos.	Nation	Player
3	MF	BEL	Niels De Schutter (from Oostende)
7	MF	MNE	Aleksandar Boljević (from PSV)
8	MF	BEL	François Marquet (from Standard Liège)
10	FW	BEL	Siebe Schrijvers (again on loan from Genk)
11	FW	BEL	Alessandro Cerigioni (from OH Leuven)
14	FW	BEL	Nicolas Orye (from Patro Eisden Maasmechelen)
15	MF	SEN	Ibrahima Seck (from Auxerre)
20	FW	BEL	Aaron Dhondt (from Izegem)
22	MF	GHA	Opoku Ampomah (from Mechelen)
24	MF	BEL	Jens Cools (from Westerlo)
25	DF	BEL	Kjetil Borry (from Roeselare)
69	DF	FRA	Rudy Camacho (from Sedan)
—	GK	HUN	László Köteles (on loan from Genk)
—	MF	FRA	Julian Michel (from Mouscron)

Out:

No.	Pos.	Nation	Player
7	MF	MTQ	Steeven Langil (to Legia Warsaw)
11	MF	BIH	Deni Milošević (loan return to Standard Liège)
12	FW	GAM	Ibou (to Roeselare)
15	MF	FRA	Thibault Moulin (to Legia Warsaw)
17	MF	BEL	David Destorme (retired)
19	DF	BEL	Glenn Leemans (on loan to Deinze)
97	FW	GLP	Livio Nabab (to Orléans)
—	FW	BEL	Dylan De Belder (was on loan to Lommel United, now sold to Lierse)

==== Westerlo ====
In:

No.	Pos.	Nation	Player
44	DF	BEL	Hervé Matthys (again on loan from Anderlecht)
—	MF	NED	Elton Acolatse (from Jong Ajax)
—	MF	BEL	Yoni Buyens (on loan from Genk)
—	DF	DEN	Daniel Christensen (from AGF)
—	FW	CGO	Silvère Ganvoula (from Elazığspor)
—	DF	BEL	Michaël Heylen (on loan from Anderlecht)
—	MF	ITA	Eric Lanini (on loan from Juventus)
—	DF	CIV	Igor Lolo (free agent)
—	FW	GRE	Michalis Manias (from PAS Giannina)
—	DF	GAB	Randal Oto'o (on loan from Braga)
—	MF	BEL	Nicolas Rommens (from Dessel Sport)

Out:

No.	Pos.	Nation	Player
7	MF	FRA	Raphaël Lecomte (to Roeselare)
12	FW	BEN	Frédéric Gounongbe (to Cardiff City)
18	MF	BEL	Nils Schouterden (to Mechelen)
19	MF	BEL	Arno Verschueren (to NAC Breda)
24	MF	BEL	Jens Cools (to Waasland-Beveren)
90	FW	LAT	Eduards Višņakovs (on loan to Ruch Chorzów)
—	FW	NED	Sherjill MacDonald (was on loan to Sparta Rotterdam, now sold to Almere City)

==== Zulte Waregem ====
In:

No.	Pos.	Nation	Player
—	MF	BEL	Sander Coopman (on loan from Club Brugge)
—	DF	BEL	Davy De fauw (from Club Brugge)
—	DF	BEL	Timothy Derijck (from ADO Den Haag)
—	DF	DEN	Brian Hamalainen (from Genk)
—	MF	DEN	Lukas Lerager (from Viborg)
—	DF	NGR	Kingsley Madu (from Trenčín)
—	DF	ITA	Luca Marrone (on loan from Juventus)
—	FW	BEL	Jens Naessens (on loan from Mechelen)
—	FW	BEL	Obbi Oularé (on loan from Watford)
—	FW	ANG	Igor Vetokele (on loan from Charlton Athletic)

Out:

No.	Pos.	Nation	Player
2	DF	FRA	Cédric D'Ulivo (to OH Leuven)
6	DF	COD	Joël Sami (to Orléans)
7	FW	SEN	Mame Thiam (loan return to Juventus)
8	MF	SRB	Marko Poletanović (loan return to Gent)
10	MF	BEL	Steve De Ridder (loan return to Copenhagen)
11	FW	BEL	Stephen Buyl (on loan to Antwerp)
16	DF	BEL	Jordy Verstraeten (to Antwerp)
24	DF	BEL	Karel D'Haene (retired)
26	MF	ENG	Chuks Aneke (to MK Dons)
42	MF	BEL	Nikola Storm (loan return to Club Brugge)
—	MF	BEL	Louis Coetsier (to Deinze)
—	MF	BEL	Charni Ekangamene (was on loan to OH Leuven, now loaned to NAC Breda)
—	GK	BEL	Steph Van Cauwenberge (to Roeselare)

=== Belgian First Division B teams ===
==== Antwerp ====
In:

No.	Pos.	Nation	Player
—	FW	BEL	Stephen Buyl (on loan from Zulte Waregem)
—	MF	TUN	Fabien Camus (from Troyes)
—	FW	BEL	Tuur Dierckx (from Club Brugge)
—	DF	BEL	Michiel Jaeken (from Dessel Sport)
—	GK	CRO	Antonijo Ježina (on loan from Dinamo Zagreb)
—	FW	BEL	Michaël Lallemand (on loan from Kortrijk)
—	FW	GHA	William Owusu (loan return from Roeselare)
—	FW	BEL	Jordan Remacle (from OH Leuven)
—	DF	BEL	Jordy Verstraeten (from Zulte Waregem)

Out:

No.	Pos.	Nation	Player
6	MF	BEL	Wim De Decker (released)
7	MF	BEL	Grégory Dufer (to RFC Liège)
9	FW	BEL	Jens Naessens (loan return to Mechelen)
18	DF	BEL	Pietro Perdichizzi (to Union SG)
19	FW	FRA	Cédric Fauré (to Union SG)
22	FW	BEL	Andy Van Hoof (to Rupel Boom)
27	FW	FRA	Romain Davigny (released)
29	DF	NOR	Jo Nymo Matland (to Hasselt)
—	FW	BEL	Jason Adesanya (loan return to Mechelen)
—	FW	BIH	Irfan Hadžić (was on loan to Hamme, now sold to Celje)
—	GK	BEL	Anwar Houmani (to Rupel Boom)
—	MF	BEL	Anthony Di Lallo (was on loan to La Louvière, now sold to Hasselt)

==== Cercle Brugge ====
In:

No.	Pos.	Nation	Player
—	MF	BEL	Paolino Bertaccini (on loan from Genk)
—	FW	COD	Axel Bossekota (loan return from Seraing United)
—	MF	BEL	Niels Coussement (from Oostende)
—	MF	GUI	Amadou Diallo (from WS Bruxelles)
—	DF	FRA	Raphaël Diarra (on loan from Monaco)
—	MF	BEL	Samuel Fabris (from WS Bruxelles)
—	MF	BEL	Jessy Gálvez López (from Charleroi)
—	MF	BEL	Mehdi Khchab (from Racing Mechelen)
—	FW	CRO	Tomislav Kiš (on loan from Kortrijk)
—	GK	BEL	Gilles Lentz (on loan from Kortrijk)
—	FW	GUI	Alhassane Soumah (on loan from Juventus)

Out:

No.	Pos.	Nation	Player
7	MF	BEL	Tibo van de Velde (to FC Eindhoven)
11	FW	BEL	Sam Valcke (to Lommel United)
41	MF	BEL	Thibaut Van Acker (to Roeselare)
—	MF	BEL	Jilke De Coninck (was on loan to Torhout, now sold to Eendracht Aalst)

==== OH Leuven ====
In:

No.	Pos.	Nation	Player
2	DF	BEL	Soufiane El Banouhi (from WS Bruxelles)
3	DF	BEL	Fazlı Kocabaş (from Union SG)
6	MF	BEL	Kenneth Houdret (was on loan from Charleroi, now bought)
7	MF	BEL	Jonathan Kindermans (from RKC Waalwijk)
9	FW	BEL	Esteban Casagolda (from Dender EH)
10	FW	CMR	Serge Tabekou (on loan from Gent)
11	FW	BEL	Ben Yagan (from Heist)
12	DF	BEL	Jeroen Simaeys (from Krylia Sovetov)
19	DF	FRA	Cédric D'Ulivo (from Zulte Waregem)
22	MF	BEL	Simon Bracke (loan return from ASV Geel)
24	DF	BEL	Nathan de Medina (on loan from Anderlecht)
26	GK	ISR	Ram Strauss (from Poli Timișoara)
30	MF	BEL	Yannick Loemba (on loan from Oostende)

Out:

No.	Pos.	Nation	Player
1	GK	BEL	Yves Lenaerts (to ASV Geel)
2	DF	BEL	Kenny Van Hoevelen (to Eendracht Aalst)
6	DF	FRA	Jean Calvé (released)
7	FW	BEL	Jordan Remacle (to Antwerp)
9	FW	CUW	Romero Regales (to Den Bosch)
10	MF	FRA	Yohan Croizet (to Mechelen)
11	FW	BEL	Alessandro Cerigioni (to Waasland-Beveren)
15	MF	TTO	John Bostock (to Lens)
16	DF	GRE	Konstantinos Rougalas (released)
17	DF	SRB	Slobodan Urošević (loan return to Napredak Kruševac)
19	MF	BEL	Leandro Trossard (loan return to Genk)
22	MF	GHA	Samuel Asamoah (loan return to Eupen)
26	GK	FRA	Rudy Riou (released)
27	FW	NGR	Kim Ojo (released)
28	DF	UKR	Oleksandr Volovyk (loan return to Shakhtar Donetsk)
31	MF	BEL	Charni Ekangamene (loan return to Zulte Waregem)
—	MF	BEL	Yohan Brouckaert (was on loan to Roeselare, now sold to RWDM47)
—	MF	BEL	Kenneth Van Goethem (was on loan to Heist, now sold to Aarschot)

==== Lierse ====
In:

No.	Pos.	Nation	Player
40	MF	KEN	Ayub Masika (was on loan from Genk, now bought)
—	MF	EGY	Amr Barakat (from Misr Lel-Makkasa)
—	FW	BEL	Dylan De Belder (from Waasland-Beveren)
—	FW	EGY	Mohamed El-Gabbas (from Wadi Degla)
—	DF	BEL	Frédéric Frans (from Partick Thistle)
—	MF	EGY	Mostafa Galal (from Wadi Degla)
—	FW	LUX	Aurélien Joachim (from WS Bruxelles)
—	MF	BEL	Faysel Kasmi (loan return from Omonia)
—	DF	GRE	Kyriakos Mazoulouxis (from Aris Thessaloniki)
—	GK	BEL	Mike Vanhamel (from WS Bruxelles)
—	DF	BEL	Jonas Vinck (from Hamme)
—	MF	BEL	Thomas Wils (from Haladás)

Out:

No.	Pos.	Nation	Player
1	GK	NED	Paul Van Der Helm (was on loan to Berchem, now released to Fortuna Sittard)
23	FW	SLO	Etien Velikonja (loan return to Cardiff City)
26	GK	BEL	Jorn Brondeel (on loan to NAC Breda)
—	FW	BEL	Iliess Bruylandts (on loan to RWDM47)
—	MF	ZAM	Ronald Kampamba (loan return to Wadi Degla)

==== Lommel United ====
In:

No.	Pos.	Nation	Player
—	FW	BEL	Jason Adesanya (from Mechelen)
—	GK	NED	Jesse Bertrams (from Jong PSV)
—	DF	BEL	Timo Cauwenberg (from ASV Geel)
—	FW	BEL	Alexandre De Bruyn (from Anderlecht)
—	MF	BEL	Jentl Gaethofs (was on loan from Genk, now bought)
—	FW	BIH	Marko Maletić (from Excelsior)
—	FW	BEL	Ridwane Mbarki (from Londerzeel)
—	DF	BEL	Mathias Schils (from Sint-Truiden)
—	FW	BEL	Sam Valcke (from Cercle Brugge)
—	MF	BEL	Senne Verbiest (on loan from Genk)

Out:

No.	Pos.	Nation	Player
1	GK	BEL	Lucas Pirard (loan return to Standard Liège)
3	MF	BEL	Lucas Schoofs (loan return to Gent)
7	MF	BEL	Brandon Deville (to Seraing United)
15	FW	BEL	Dylan De Belder (loan return to Waasland-Beveren)
31	MF	NED	Issam Al Kamouchi (on loan to Hades)
—	MF	GHA	Eugene Ansah (loan return to Lokeren)

==== Roeselare ====
In:

No.	Pos.	Nation	Player
2	DF	BEL	Martijn Monteyne (from Roda JC)
10	MF	FRA	Samy Kehli (from Metz)
14	MF	BIH	Nermin Zolotić (from Gent)
17	MF	BEL	Grégory Grisez (from WS Bruxelles)
39	GK	BEL	Jo Coppens (from MVV Maastricht)
25	GK	BEL	Wouter Biebauw (from Kortrijk)
—	MF	FRA	Lilian Bochet (from Dudelange)
—	FW	GAM	Ibou (from Waasland-Beveren)
—	FW	CRO	Marin Jakoliš (from Virton)
—	DF	BEL	François Kompany (released, then signed again)
—	MF	FRA	Raphaël Lecomte (from Westerlo)
—	MF	BEL	Thibaut Van Acker (from Cercle Brugge)
—	GK	BEL	Steph Van Cauwenberge (from Zulte Waregem)
—	MF	BEL	Lukas Van Eenoo (on loan from Kortrijk)

Out:

No.	Pos.	Nation	Player
4	DF	BEL	Kjetil Borry (to Waasland-Beveren)
10	MF	BEL	Sven De Rechter (to Sint-Eloois-Winkel)
14	MF	BEL	Vincent Provoost (to Zwevezele)
16	MF	BEL	Yohan Brouckaert (loan return to OH Leuven)
17	MF	ALB	Enis Gavazaj (loan return to Gent)
20	MF	BEL	Rik Impens (loan return to Gent)
21	MF	BEL	Jasper Maerten (to Gullegem)
22	MF	BEL	Dylan Ragolle (to Beerschot Wilrijk)
25	MF	BEL	Niels Coussement (loan return to Oostende)
—	FW	GHA	William Owusu (loan return to Antwerp)

==== Tubize ====
In:

No.	Pos.	Nation	Player
1	GK	FRA	Quentin Beunardeau (was on loan from Nancy, now bought)
6	MF	FRA	Emeric Dudouit (from Les Herbiers VF)
10	MF	CRO	Mario Babić (from Rudar Velenje)
24	DF	RWA	Salomon Nirisarike (from Sint-Truiden)
27	DF	FRA	Alassane Touré (from Gazélec Ajaccio)
29	DF	BRA	Alan Pires da Graça (from Glória)
35	GK	BEL	Thibaut Rausin (from Mouscron)

Out:

No.	Pos.	Nation	Player
6	MF	BEL	Philippe Liard (to RWDM47)
18	DF	FRA	Vincent Di Stefano (to Sedan)
22	DF	FRA	Médéric Deher (loan return to Metz)
23	MF	BEL	Baptiste Ulens (loan return to Kortrijk)
26	GK	BEL	Adrien Saussez (to Union SG)

==== Union SG ====
In:

No.	Pos.	Nation	Player
—	MF	FRA	Pierre-Baptiste Baherlé (from Sint-Truiden)
—	FW	FRA	Cédric Fauré (from Antwerp)
—	FW	BEL	Mathias Fixelles (from Woluwe-Zaventem)
—	DF	BEL	Cédric Guiro (loan return from La Louvière)
—	FW	COD	Freddy Mombongo-Dues (from Waldhof Mannheim)
—	DF	BEL	Alessio Palmeri (from Dender EH)
—	DF	BEL	Pietro Perdichizzi (from Antwerp)
—	GK	BEL	Adrien Saussez (from Tubize)

Out:

No.	Pos.	Nation	Player
4	DF	BEL	Anthony Cabeke (to RWDM47)
15	MF	ITA	Ignazio Cocchiere (to Dender EH)
44	DF	BEL	Fazlı Kocabaş (to OH Leuven)
—	GK	BEL	Yoran Chalon (on loan to Rebecq)
—	DF	BEL	Constant Delsanne (on loan to RWDM47)
—	MF	FRA	Mehdi Haddadou (loan return to Sint-Truiden)
—	FW	BEL	Sami Lkoutbi (was on loan to Racing Mechelen, now sold to Londerzeel)
