= Lilian Bochet =

French footballer (born 1991)

Personal information
- Date of birth: 4 March 1991 (age 35)
- Place of birth: Maubeuge, France
- Height: 1.77 m (5 ft 10 in)
- Position: Central midfielder

Team information
- Current team: KSV Rumbeke

Youth career
- Valenciennes

Senior career*
Years	Team	Apps	(Gls)
2010–2011	Valenciennes	1	(0)
2012–2013	Roye	16	(1)
2013–2014	Boussu Dour Borinage	30	(3)
2014–2015	RFC Seraing	25	(3)
2015	F91 Dudelange		
2016–2018	Roeselare	13	(0)
2018	Olympic Charleroi	12	(1)
2019	RFC Seraing	9	(0)
2019–2020	KSCT Menen	23	(3)
2020–2022	Zwevezele	6	(0)
2022	KSCT Menen	12	(3)
2022–2023	SC Dikkelvenne	12	(2)
2023–	KSV Rumbeke		
- * Club domestic league appearances and goals as of 17:49, 15 January 2026 (UTC)

Lilian Bochet (born 4 March 1991) is a French footballer who plays as a midfielder for KSV Rumbeke.

== Career ==
Bochet began his career on Valenciennes FC. On 28 August 2010, he made his Ligue 1 debut, against Montpellier HSC.

After one season with first team, Bochet was released.

In January 2019, he returned to RFC Seraing.
