= Tibo Van de Velde =

Belgian footballer (born 1993)

Personal information
- Date of birth: 5 December 1993 (age 32)
- Place of birth: Maldegem, Belgium
- Height: 1.78 m (5 ft 10 in)
- Position: Winger

Team information
- Current team: Torhout
- Number: 10

Youth career
- 2000–2005: KSK Maldegem
- 2005–2009: Club Brugge
- 2009–2010: Roeselare
- 2012: Gent

Senior career*
Years	Team	Apps	(Gls)
2010–2012	Roeselare	30	(1)
2012–2015	Deinze	71	(19)
2015–2016	Cercle Brugge	12	(0)
2016–2018	FC Eindhoven	55	(7)
2018–2019	Knokke	21	(2)
2019–2021	Zwevezele	24	(5)
2021–2022	Sint-Eloois-Winkel	31	(5)
2023–2024	Roeselare-Daisel	3	(0)
2024–	Torhout	27	(6)

International career
2008	Belgium U15	3	(0)
2009	Belgium U16	2	(0)
2010	Belgium U17	1	(0)
2010–2011	Belgium U18	6	(0)
- * Club domestic league appearances and goals as of 14:47, 21 January 2026 (UTC)

Tibo Van de Velde (born 5 December 1993) is a Belgian footballer who plays as a winger for Belgian club Torhout.

== Club career ==
Van de Velde progressed through the Roeselare youth academy, after having joined them as a 15-year-old after coming over from Club Brugge. On 4 September 2010, he made his debut in the Belgian Second Division against Royal Antwerp at the age of sixteen. On 17 November 2011, he scored his first league goal away against Rupel Boom. In 2012, he moved to Gent.

In January 2013, he signed with Deinze, where he would score nineteen goals in 71 league matches.

In June 2015, he signed a two-year contract with Cercle Brugge.

On 12 August 2016, he signed a contract with Dutch Eerste Divisie club FC Eindhoven, who had finished in fourth place the previous season.

On 25 February 2018, Van de Velde signed a two-year contract with Knokke, joining them from 1 July 2018.

In 2019, he joined Zwevezele.

On 19 February 2021, Van de Velde signed with Sint-Eloois-Winkel Sport, joining the club from 1 July 2021. On 29 August, he made his debut in the fifth round of the Belgian Cup, where his club knocked out Mandel United after a penalty shootout following a 0–0 draw. His league debut also occurred against Mandel, on 12 September, as the clubs drew again, this time 1–1. Van de Velde managed to score his first goal for Sint-Eloois-Winkel on 31 October in a 1–1 draw against league leaders Liège.

In November 2022, Van de Velde joined Belgian Division 3 club Roeselare-Daisel on a six-month contract.

== International career ==
Van de Velde gained multiple caps for Belgium between under-15 and under-18 level.

== Personal life ==
Next to playing football, Van de Velde works as a mail carrier.
