= RUS Rebecquoise =

Belgian football club

Rebecq
- Full name: Royal Union Sportive Rebecquoise
- Founded: 1930
- Ground: Complexe Gobard, Rebecq
- Capacity: 500
- Manager: Luigi Nasca
- League: Division 2
- 2021–22: Division 2 ACFF, 5th of 16
- Website: http://www.rusrebecquoise.be/
Home colours	Away colours

Royal Union Sportive Rebecquoise, commonly known as RUS Rebecquoise, is an association football club from the municipality of Rebecq, Walloon Brabant, Belgium. It was founded in 1930 and currently plays in the Belgian Division 2, the fourth tier on Belgian football.

== Current squad ==
As of 9 February 2022

Note: Flags indicate national team as defined under FIFA eligibility rules; some limited exceptions apply. Players may hold more than one non-FIFA nationality.

No.	Pos.	Nation	Player
1	GK	BEL	Kevin de Wolf
2	DF	BEL	Quentin Laurent
4	DF	BEL	Florian Devel
7	FW	BEL	Blaise Baillet
8	DF	BEL	Gianni Cordaro
9	MF	BEL	Denis Delaunoit
10	FW	BFA	Moussa Traoré
14	DF	BEL	Romain De Pascale
16	MF	BEL	Ben Alpha Kaba
20	MF	BEL	William Piret
21	FW	BEL	Jessy Gálvez López

No.	Pos.	Nation	Player
22	MF	BEL	Régis Demolie
23	GK	BEL	Andrew De Reymaeker
25	FW	FRA	Anthony Bova
27	DF	BEL	Constant Delsanne
32	DF	BRA	Andrei Camargo
35	MF	BEL	Lou Wallaert
45	FW	BEL	Thomas Depotbecker
66	FW	BEL	Alessio Di Vita
95	FW	BEL	Leandro Bailly
—	FW	BEL	Ilias Sbaa
—	DF	BEL	Matteo Galofaro
