= Jentl Gaethofs =

Belgian footballer

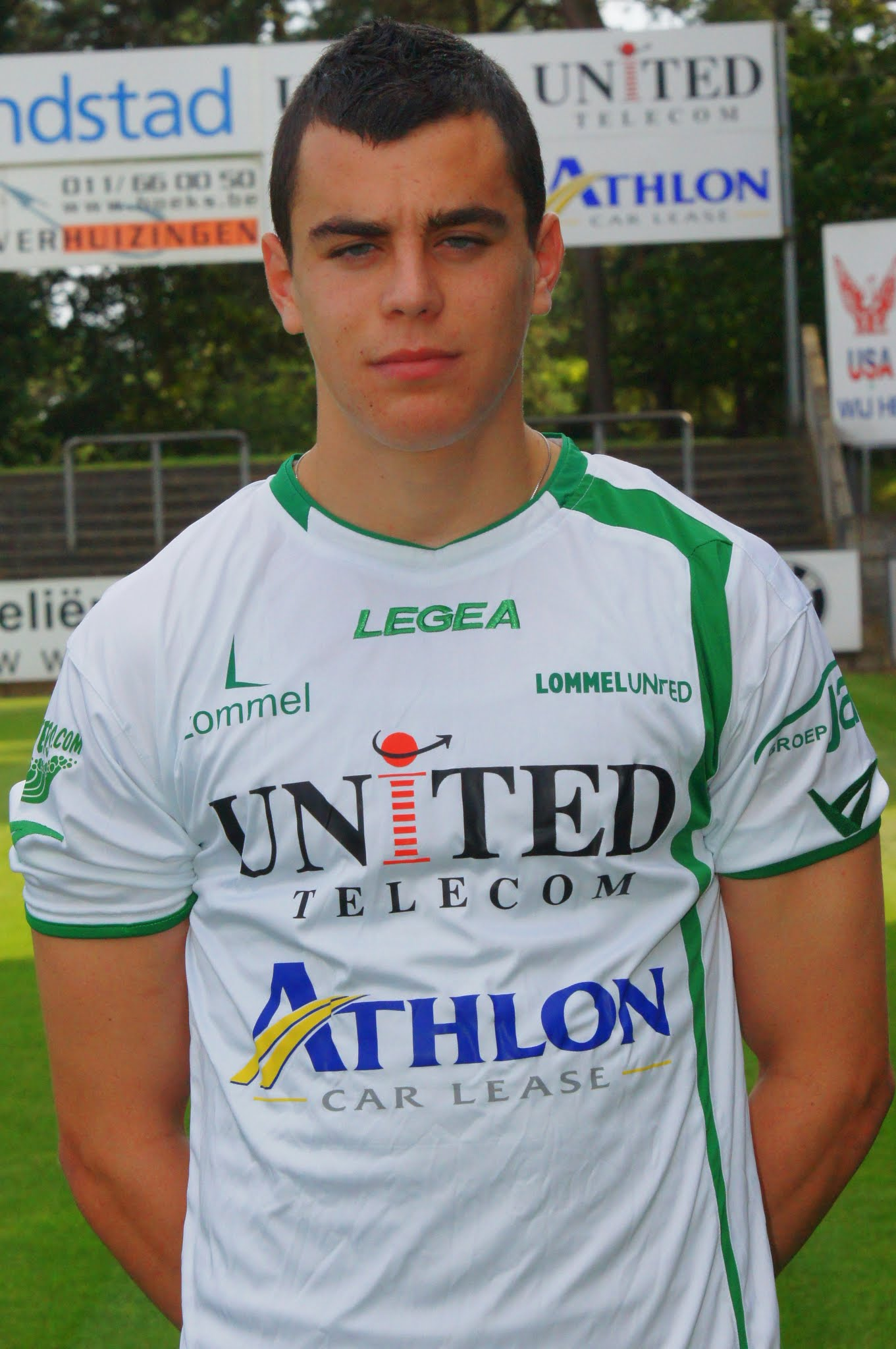

Personal information
- Full name: Jentl Gaethofs
- Date of birth: 21 April 1993 (age 33)
- Place of birth: Belgium
- Height: 1.79 m (5 ft 10 1/2 in)
- Position: Midfielder

Team information
- Current team: Wezel Sport
- Number: 17

Youth career
- –2012: Genk

Senior career*
Years	Team	Apps	(Gls)
2012–2016	Genk	0	(0)
2012–2016	→ Lommel United (loan)	124	(7)
2016–2019	Lommel United	86	(3)
2019	→ Dessel Sport (loan)	9	(0)
2019–2020	Dessel Sport	5	(0)
2020–	Wezel Sport		
- * Club domestic league appearances and goals as of 19:02, 11 April 2021 (UTC)

Jentl Gaethofs (born 21 April 1994) is a Belgian footballer who currently plays for FC Wezel Sport as a midfielder.
