= RWDM Brussels =

Belgian football club

- Full name: RWDM Brussels
- Founded: 2015; 11 years ago (takeover)
- Ground: Edmond Machtens Stadium
- Capacity: 12,266
- Owner: Thierry Dailly
- Caretaker manager: Christ Bruno
- League: Belgian Division 1
- 2025–26: Challenger Pro League, 13th of 17 (relegated)
- Website: www.rwdm.brussels/en
Home colours	Away colours

RWDM Brussels is a Belgian professional football club based in Molenbeek-Saint-Jean, a municipality of Brussels. The team plays in the Belgian Division 1, the third tier of the Belgian football league system.

The club was previously known as Racing White Daring Molenbeek (RWDM) until June 2025, when it briefly rebranded to Daring Brussels and formally reclaimed matricule 2, originally assigned to the now-defunct Daring Club de Bruxelles, founded in 1895. While the present-day club was founded in the 21st century, it identifies itself with the legacy of several predecessor entities, including Racing White, RWD Molenbeek (1973–2002), and the original Daring club.

Daring Brussels play their home matches at the Edmond Machtens Stadium, wear red, black and white as their traditional colours, and incorporate gold detailing in their crest as a reference to early club heritage.

== History ==
Former RWDM crest

The club was founded in 2015. Standard Wetteren had folded that year and merged with another club, liberating its matricule (registration number), which was sold to people wanting to revive the former RWDM with matricule 47, which folded in 2002. As such the new club was named RWDM47.

The club quickly rose through the ranks, winning two consecutive promotions from the fifth to the third tier. In December 2021, the club announced that it had come under the ownership of American business executive John Textor, who also holds stakes in English side Crystal Palace, Brazilian side Botafogo and French side Lyon.

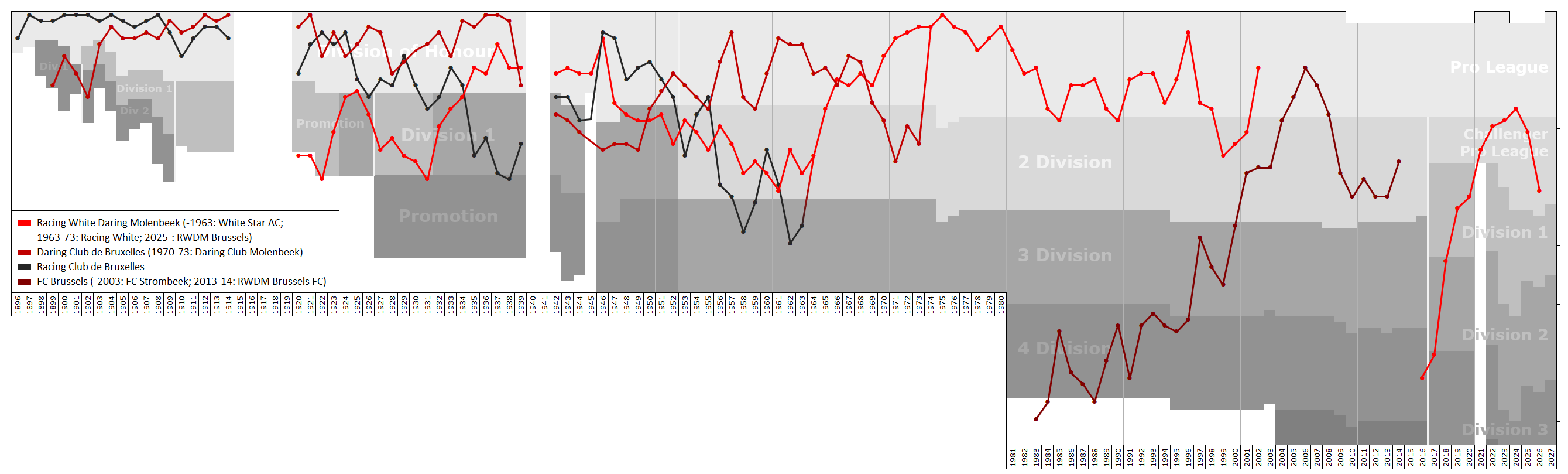
Historical league performance chart of RWDM and its predecessors

RWDM's academy is in Belgium, and many footballers have come from there, notably Adnan Januzaj and Michy Batshuayi to name a few Belgian internationals as well as a few internationals for other countries.

On 13 May 2023, RWDM secured promotion to the Belgian Pro League by winning the Challenger Pro League title in a narrow 1–0 victory over RSCA Futures, with Mickaël Biron scoring the winning goal. They went straight back down at the end of their first season back in the top flight and the following season narrowly missed out on promotion, wasting a strong lead with just two games to go and eventually ending just short of automatic promotion.

The logo of the new club, as proposed on 5 June 2025

On 5 June 2025, the club announced that it would adopt a new name, an initiative proposed by its American owner, John Textor. Effective 1 July 2025, the club would be known as Daring Brussels, a reference to the legacy of the historic Daring Club de Bruxelles, originally founded in 1895. As part of the rebranding, the club planned to adopt a new logo and assume matricule 2. The official club colours were revised to include red, white, black, and gold. The decision provoked significant backlash from supporters of RWDM, many of whom expressed strong attachment to the traditional name and the original red, white, and black colour scheme. The rebranding also drew criticism from the municipality of Molenbeek, which had previously granted the club free use of the Edmond Machtens Stadium on the condition that the name "Molenbeek" be retained.

On 7 July 2025, after protests from supporters, it was decided that the name change would not go ahead and the name "RWDM", the old logo and the colours would be retained while the word "Brussels" would be added to the name to support the club's international interests. The club will also continue under matricule 2.

RWDM Brussels finished 13th of seventeen in the 2025–26 Challenger Pro League and was initially in a relegation place under a regulation that shielded under-23 sides from the drop; it retained its place on sporting grounds after the Belgian Competition Authority suspended that rule on 8 May 2026. Its licence application was nonetheless undermined by financial and administrative shortcomings, and on 22 May 2026 the Belgian Court of Arbitration for Sport (C-SAR) rejected the club's appeal for a professional licence; RWDM Brussels was therefore administratively relegated from the Challenger Pro League despite its survival on the field. Having instead been granted an amateur licence, the club was placed in the third-tier Belgian Division 1 for 2026–27, with Club NXT retaining a second-tier place as a result; the relegation across several divisions that had been feared was avoided.

The relegation came amid insolvency proceedings. A bankruptcy petition brought by the club's former chief executive Gauthier Ganaye, over some €1.2 million in severance, was heard on 1 June 2026, when the Brussels companies court adjourned the petitions to 29 June and the club filed for judicial reorganisation, allowing it to continue for the time being.

== Rivalries and fanbase ==
RWDM's traditional rival is Union Saint-Gilloise, which goes back to the 19th century when RWDM were known as Daring Club. RWDM also have a rivalry with RSC Anderlecht, with just 3 kilometres separating the two clubs and the fixtures often taking over the mantle of the "Derby of Brussels" in the professional era due to Union's relative decline. There is a common perception that RWDM's fan base is more working-class and rooted in the northern suburbs of Brussels, in contrast to Union Saint-Gilloise, which is often associated with left-leaning 'bobo' supporters and expatriates, while R.S.C. Anderlecht attracts fans from across the country.

RWDM also have rivalries with Eendracht Aalst, Lierse, and RFC Liège.

RWDM drew support from across the Belgian capital due to its merger of 4 teams, as well as in the Periphery, where many Brusseleirs migrated to, in contrast to the more locally based Saint-Gilles support and the nationwide Anderlecht support. It had high attendances for a big part of its existence as RWDM, until financial troubles and the subsequent changeover with Johan Vermeesch in charge of the new club led to the name change to FC Brussels, and caused a split in the fanbase. During their years as FC Brussels, the Ultra group Brussels Power 05 emerged, while many of the "old school" casuals "Brussels Boys" boycotted. These days both supporter groups sit in the same Bloc A.

== Players ==
=== First-team squad ===
As of 8 August 2026.

Note: Flags indicate national team as defined under FIFA eligibility rules; some limited exceptions apply. Players may hold more than one non-FIFA nationality.

No.	Pos.	Nation	Player
2	DF	BEL	Jonas Vinck
6	MF	BEL	Sada Diallo
7	MF	BEL	Ridwane M'Barki
9	FW	BEL	Tibe Vanhaeren
11	FW	FRA	Redouan Belkaious
12	MF	BEL	Pedro Pinto
16	DF	BEL	Imad Ghiouar
17	DF	GER	Kevin Bukusu
20	MF	BEL	Théo Gécé
28	MF	BEL	Jasper Van Oudenhove
30	GK	FRA	Adam Delplace
31	DF	BEL	Noah Dodeigne

No.	Pos.	Nation	Player
33	GK	BEL	Théo Defourny
44	DF	BEL	Noa Wyns
45	DF	BEL	Bilal Sanhaji
46	DF	CAF	Aaron Kamardin
52	FW	BEL	Zakaria El Kababri
59	MF	FRA	Tom Moore
74	MF	BEL	Rayhan El Grafel
77	FW	FRA	Antoine Livemont
79	DF	BEL	Nathan De Raes
81	FW	BEL	Niklo Dailly
—	DF	COD	Nils Nieki
—	DF	BEL	Sacha Marloye

=== Out on loan ===
Note: Flags indicate national team as defined under FIFA eligibility rules; some limited exceptions apply. Players may hold more than one non-FIFA nationality.

No. / Pos. / Nation / Player; — / DF / BEL / Alexandre Petitjean (at Schaerbeek until 30 June 2027)	No. / Pos. / Nation / Player

== Club staff ==
Position	Staff
Chairman & Owner	(Belgium) Thierry Dailly
President	(Belgium) Thierry Dailly
Head coach	(Belgium) Christ Bruno
Assistant Coach	(Belgium) Pepijn Mertens (Belgium) Siebe van der Bosch
Goalkeeper Coach	(Belgium) Thierry Berghmans

== Honours ==
- Challenger Pro League
  - Winner (1): 2022–23

== See also ==
- RWD Molenbeek (1909)
