= Randal Oto'o =

Gabonese footballer

Oto'o
Personal information
- Full name: Junior Randal Oto'o Zué
- Date of birth: 23 May 1994 (age 32)
- Place of birth: Libreville, Gabon
- Height: 1.82 m (5 ft 11 1/2 in)
- Position: Right-back

Team information
- Current team: GSI Pontivy
- Number: 4

Youth career
- 2011–2012: Stade Mandji
- 2012–2013: Braga

Senior career*
Years	Team	Apps	(Gls)
2013–2018	Braga B	29	(0)
2013–2014	→ Leixões (loan)	23	(0)
2015–2016	→ Tondela (loan)	19	(0)
2016–2018	→ Westerlo (loan)	25	(0)
2018–2019	Westerlo	25	(0)
2019–2020	Cova da Piedade	3	(0)
2021	SC Ideal	3	(0)
2022	Camacha	9	(1)
2022–2023	Marinhense	18	(0)
2023–	GSI Pontivy	9	(0)

International career
2013–2020	Gabon	15	(0)
- * Club domestic league appearances and goals as of 17:51, 31 March 2024 (UTC)

Randal Oto’o (born 23 May 1994) is a Gabonese football player who plays as a right-back for French Championnat National 3 side GSI Pontivy.
