= Jonas Vinck =

Belgian footballer

Personal information
- Date of birth: 25 October 1995 (age 31)
- Place of birth: Asse, Belgium
- Height: 1.78 m (5 ft 10 in)
- Position: Right-back

Team information
- Current team: RWDM Brussels
- Number: 2

Youth career
- –2013: KAA Gent

Senior career*
Years	Team	Apps	(Gls)
2013–2016	Hamme	35	(2)
2016–2018	Lierse SK	35	(2)
2018–2019	Deinze	26	(2)
2019–2020	Lierse Kempenzonen	21	(1)
2020	Roeselare	0	(0)
2021–2023	Virton	45	(0)
2023–2024	Oostende	28	(0)
2024–2026	Lokeren	32	(1)
2026–	RWDM Brussels	2	(0)
- * Club domestic league appearances and goals as of 30 September 2026

Jonas Vinck (born 25 June 1995) is a Belgian professional footballer who plays as a right-back for RWDM Brussels.

== Club career ==
On 20 July 2023, Vinck signed a three-year contract with Oostende.
