= Vincent Provoost =

Belgian footballer (born 1984)

Personal information
- Date of birth: 7 February 1984 (age 42)
- Place of birth: Bruges, Belgium
- Height: 1.78 m (5 ft 10 in)
- Position: Defensive midfielder

Senior career*
Years	Team	Apps	(Gls)
2005–2006	Club Brugge	1	(0)
2006–2008	Kortrijk	18	(3)
2008–2011	Roeselare	85	(2)
2011–2014	Mouscron-Péruwelz	84	(4)
2014–2016	Roeselare	58	(5)
2016–2021	Zwevezele		
- * Club domestic league appearances and goals

Vincent Provoost (born 7 February 1984) is a Belgian former professional footballer who played as a defensive midfielder, most recently for Zwevezele in the Belgian Division 2.

== Honours ==
Club Brugge

- Belgian Super Cup: 2004
