= Pierre-Baptiste Baherlé =

French footballer (born 1991)

Personal information
- Date of birth: 7 July 1991 (age 35)
- Place of birth: Cucq, France
- Height: 1.80 m (5 ft 11 in)
- Position: Midfielder

Team information
- Current team: Bassin d'Arcachon

Youth career
- US Boulogne

Senior career*
Years	Team	Apps	(Gls)
2010–2011	Lille B	27	(3)
2011–2013	US Boulogne	7	(1)
2013–2013	FC Chambly	12	(2)
2013–2014	Stade Bordelais	25	(4)
2014–2015	Sint-Truiden VV	32	(2)
2016–2017	Union SG	17	(0)
2019–	Bassin d'Arcachon		
- * Club domestic league appearances and goals as of 14:42, 5 May 2019 (UTC)

Pierre-Baptiste Baherlé (born 7 July 1991) is a French footballer who currently plays for FC Bassin d'Arcachon.

== Career ==
=== Bassin d'Arcachon ===
On 18 January 2019 it was confirmed, that Baherlé had joined FC Bassin d'Arcachon.
