= Julian Michel =

French footballer (born 1992)

Personal information
- Full name: Julian Michel Bendahbi
- Date of birth: 25 February 1992 (age 34)
- Place of birth: Échirolles, France
- Height: 1.72 m (5 ft 8 in)
- Position: Midfielder

Youth career
- Lyon

Senior career*
Years	Team	Apps	(Gls)
2009–2010	Louhans-Cuiseaux	2	(0)
2011–2013	Lille B	50	(6)
2013–2016	Mouscron	79	(10)
2016–2017	Waasland-Beveren	16	(0)
2017–2019	Lokeren	23	(1)
2019–2020	Lokeren II		
2021	Roub Hommelet		
2022–2023	US Tourcoing		
2023–2024	KVK Westhoek	10	(2)
- * Club domestic league appearances and goals

Julian Michel Bendahbi (born 19 February 1992) is a French former professional footballer who played as a midfielder.

== Club career ==
Michel joined Royal Mouscron-Péruwelz in 2013 from Lille B. In 2014, the club promoted to the Belgian Pro League. He made his top division debut at 27 July 2014 against Anderlecht in a 3–1 away defeat.

On 31 January 2019, it was announced that Michel, Mario Tičinović and Djordje Jovanovic had been promoted to reserve team due to a lack of commitment. The club was in a very bad position, which with seven matches to go was very close to relegation.

In 2021, Michel played for French club Roub Hommelet. In the 2022–23 season, he played for US Tourcoing.

In the summer 2023, Michel signed for Belgian club KVK Westhoek. In the summer of 2024, it emerged that Michel had decided to hang up his boots.

== Personal life ==
He has Moroccan nationality through his mother.
