= Baptiste Ulens =

Belgian footballer

Personal information
- Date of birth: 24 July 1987 (age 39)
- Place of birth: Boussu, Belgium
- Height: 1.77 m (5 ft 10 in)
- Positions: Left winger; left-back

Senior career*
Years	Team	Apps	(Gls)
2005–2007	RAEC Mons	2	(0)
2007–2009	Sporting Charleroi	0	(0)
2008	→ Liège (loan)	1	(0)
2009–2010	Olympic Charleroi	4	(0)
2010–2013	RWS Bruxelles	50	(1)
2013–2016	Kortrijk	39	(1)
2016	Tubize	9	(0)
2016–2018	La Louvière Centre	9	(1)
2018–2020	RAEC Mons		
2020–2024	RFC Rapid Symphorinois		
2024–2026	Flénu		
- * Club domestic league appearances and goals as of 16 January 2026

Baptiste Ulens (born 24 July 1987) is a retired Belgian professional footballer who played as a winger.

== Career ==
The right midfielder made two appearances in his early career in the Belgian First Division for R.A.E.C. Mons. He joined K.V. Kortrijk from WS Woluwe FC in January 2013
