= Alessio Carlone =

Belgian footballer (born 1996)

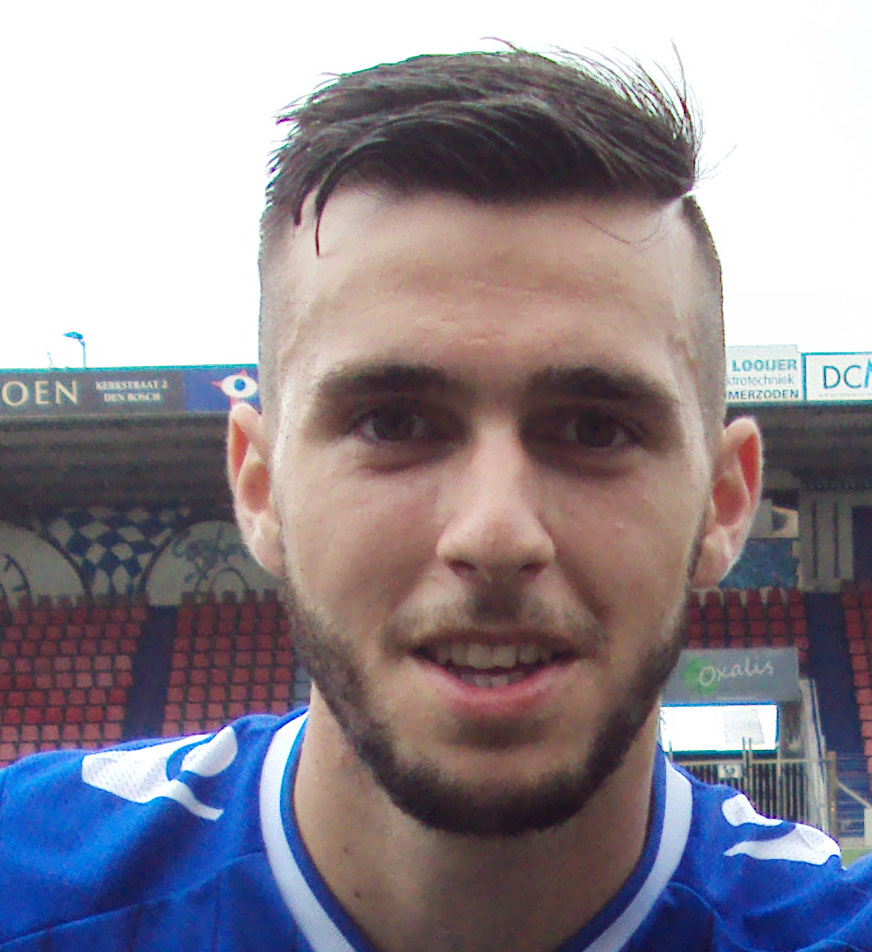
- Carlone with Den Bosch in 2016

Personal information
- Date of birth: 20 January 1996 (age 30)
- Place of birth: Genk, Belgium
- Height: 1.69 m (5 ft 7 in)
- Position: Winger

Youth career
- Kabouters Opglabbeek
- Bocholter VV
- –2015: Genk

Senior career*
Years	Team	Apps	(Gls)
2015–2017	Genk	0	(0)
2016–2017	→ Den Bosch (loan)	33	(2)
2017–2019	FC Eindhoven	9	(1)
2019	Patro Eisden	0	(0)
2019–2020	Politehnica Iași	6	(0)
2020	Botoșani	8	(0)
Total		56	(3)
- * Club domestic league appearances and goals

Alessio Carlone (born 20 January 1996) is a Belgian former professional footballer who played as a winger.

== Club career ==
=== Genk ===
Although Carlone is a youth product of Belgian club Genk, he never made his debut for the Belgian First Division A club. While on loan from Genk, Carlone made his professional debut in the Eerste Divisie for FC Den Bosch, on 31 January 2016, in a game against Sparta Rotterdam.

=== Eindhoven ===
In the summer of 2017, he joined FC Eindhoven, but a serious knee injury hampered his development.

=== Patro Eisden ===
On 13 February 2019, Carlone joined Belgian club Patro Eisden.

=== Politehnica Iași ===
On 26 June 2019, after only half a season in Belgium, Carlone joined Romanian club Politehnica Iași on a three-year deal. On 31 January 2020, Carlone was released by Politehnica Iași.

=== Botoșani ===
On 31 January 2020, Carlone joined Liga I side Botoșani. On 8 October 2020 he was forced to announce his immediate retirement from the game following a series of heart problems.
