= Jessy Gálvez López =

Belgian footballer

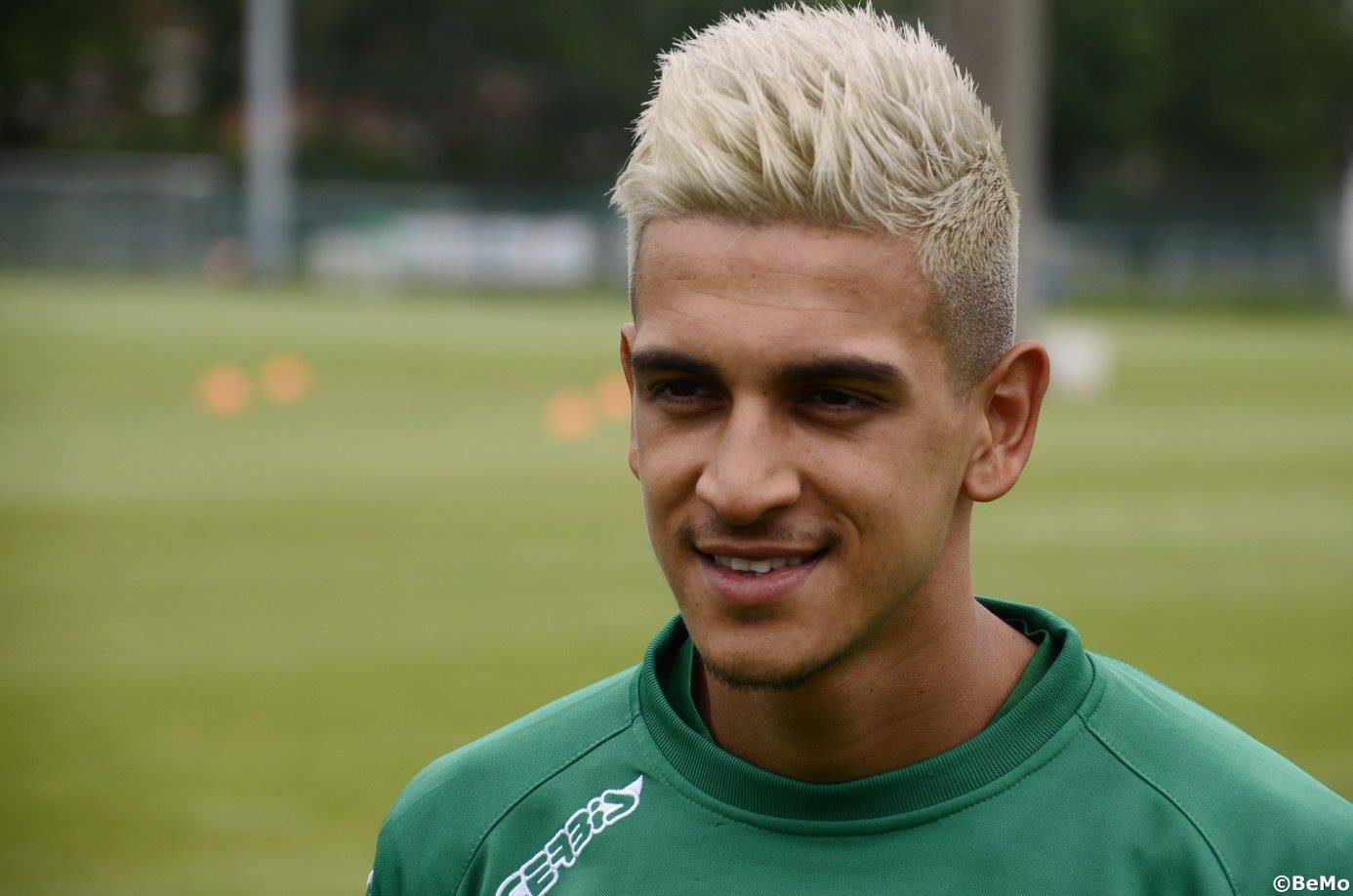

Personal information
- Date of birth: 17 July 1995 (age 31)
- Place of birth: Charleroi, Belgium
- Height: 1.77 m (5 ft 10 in)
- Position: Left winger

Team information
- Current team: Rebecq
- Number: 21

Youth career
- 2003–2008: Charleroi Fleurus
- 2008–2013: Sporting Charleroi

Senior career*
Years	Team	Apps	(Gls)
2013–2016	Sporting Charleroi	37	(4)
2016–2018	Cercle Brugge	20	(0)
2018–2019	Châtelet	31	(2)
2019–2021	RAAL La Louvière	15	(3)
2021–	Rebecq	17	(0)

International career
2010–2011	Belgium U16	8	(0)
2012	Belgium U18	2	(0)
2013–2014	Belgium U19	12	(1)
- * Club domestic league appearances and goals as of 23 April 2022

Jessy Gálvez López (born 17 July 1995) is a Belgian professional footballer who plays as a left winger for Rebecq.

== Career ==
López joined RAAL La Louvière ahead of the 2019–20 season.

On 16 March 2021, López signed with Rebecq alongside Quentin Laurent.

== International career ==
Born in Belgium, Gálvez López is of Spanish descent through his father. He is a youth international for Belgium, having played up to the Belgium U19s.
