= Ignazio Cocchiere =

Italian footballer

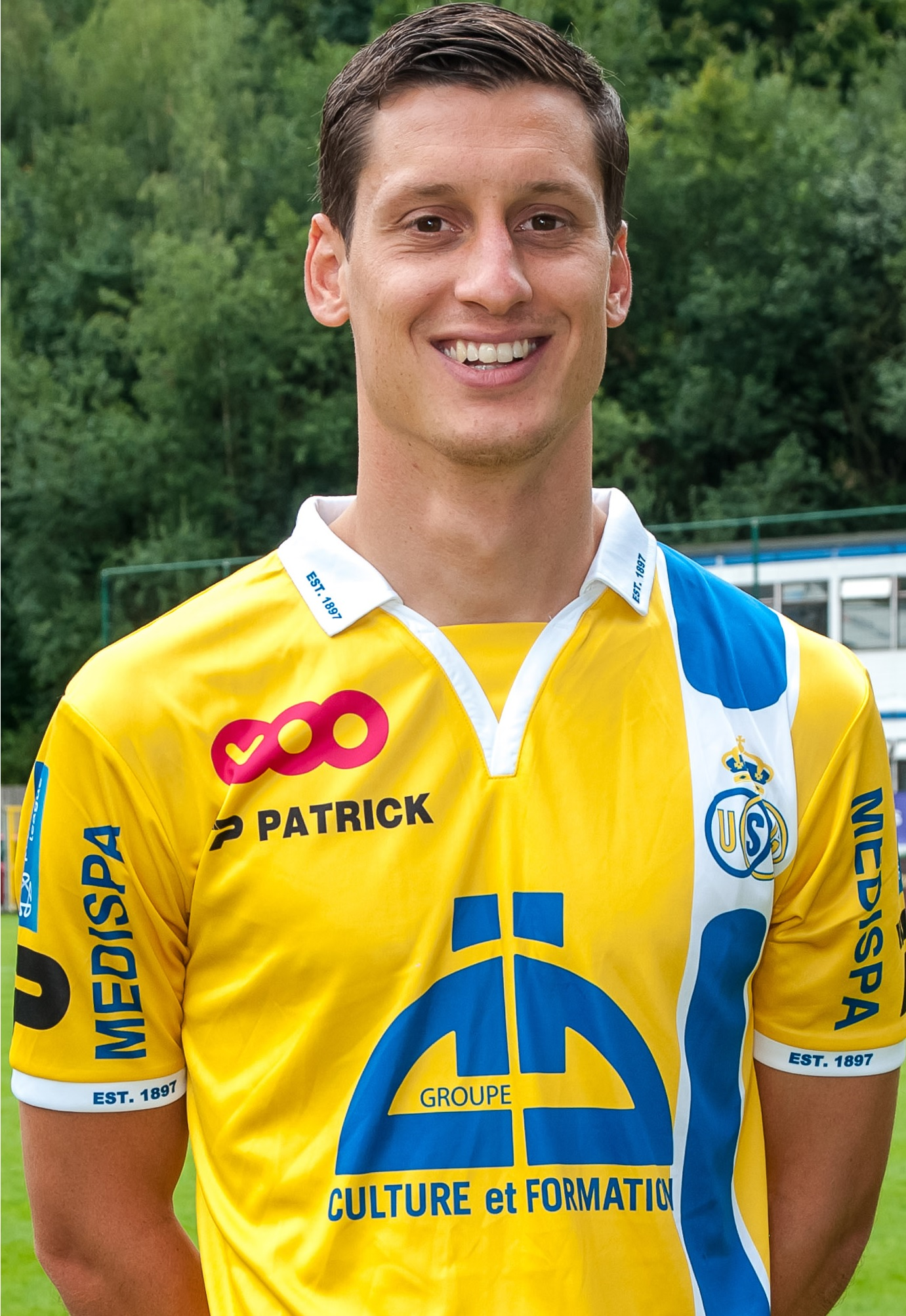
- Cocchiere in Union shirt

Personal information
- Date of birth: 19 September 1987 (age 39)
- Place of birth: Varese, Italy
- Height: 1.85 m (6 ft 1 in)
- Position: Forward

Team information
- Current team: Braine
- Number: 15

Youth career
- 2006–2007: Internazionale

Senior career*
Years	Team	Apps	(Gls)
2007–2008	Pizzighettone	2	(0)
2008–2009	Pro Patria	0	(0)
2010	Baulmes	12	(7)
2010–2011	Nyon	5	(0)
2011–2012	Gallaratese	11	(5)
2012	Caronnese	5	(0)
2013–2016	Union SG	93	(29)
2016–2019	Dender	89	(43)
2019–2021	Eendracht Aalst	25	(11)
2021–2024	Tempo Overijse	86	(59)
2025–2026	Braine	0	(0)
2026-	ROFC Stockel		
- * Club domestic league appearances and goals as of 16 January 2026

Ignazio Cocchiere (born 19 September 1987) is an Italian footballer who plays as a forward for ROFC Stockel. After starting his career with Internazionale, he played for clubs in Italy, Switzerland, and Belgium. He combined his football career with university studies in both Italy and Switzerland.

== Football career ==
=== Youth career ===
Born in Varese, Lombardy, Cocchiere signed his first professional contract mid-2006 for top Serie A club Internazionale at the age of 18, where he joined the reserve team. At the Inter reserves he played in a very strong youth team, featuring Mario Balotelli, Jonathan Biabiany and Leonardo Bonucci among others, resulting in winning the Primavera league.

=== Lega Pro ===
After graduation from the Reserves, Cocchiere left for Pizzighettone in late-August 2007. As the club also signed several experienced players, the young Cocchiere featured only in two matches that season. In 2008–09 Lega Pro Prima Divisione, he was signed by Pro Patria. Cocchiere had few chances to play for the first team and the fact that he combined his football career with studying at university meant he looked for opportunities elsewhere.

=== Switzerland ===
Cocchiere found the opportunity to combine both careers when he was signed by Swiss Challenge League club Nyon in 2010, and he simultaneously enrolled in Political Science at the University of Geneva. As a result of the Swiss maximum number of foreign players he was initially loaned out to Swiss 1. Liga club Baulmes. Here he had a successful run of games playing an attacking right-back and contributed to the club's form with 7 goals in 12 games. His goal scoring record contributed to the decision of Nyon to call him back to the club and add him to the squad in summer of 2010. However, after a few appearances partly due to injury, Cocchiere was released in summer of 2011 when he decided not to accept any of the received offers from Swiss Second Division clubs and to return to Italy to finish his university degree. Cocchiere then returned to Italy to finish his master's degree at Universita Cattolica del Sacro Cuore and signed for Serie D club Gallaratese. At the club he scored 5 goals in 11 games. On 4 January 2012, he was signed by Caronnese, where he stayed for one season during which he finished his degree.

=== Belgium ===
Cocchiere moved to Brussels where he signed for Royal Union Saint-Gilloise and combined his football career with a career working for the European Parliament. After some successful seasons playing for Union, Cocchiere started featuring less in the starting eleven during season 2015–2016. This eventually lead to his departure with Cocchiere moving to FCV Dender EH, signing a one-year contract with an option of one more year. He quoted the reputation and great infrastructure of the club as some of the reasons for signing. Cocchiere was voted as 'Man of the Match' by Dender fans on frequent occasions and scored 12 goals in his first 16 official games. His successful first season, seeing him netting 20 goals, led the club to offering him an improved contract in April 2017, shortly before the league's playoffs. He later moved to second division amateurs club SC Eendracht Aalst in 2019 and then played for Tempo Overisje, scoring 25 goals in 30 games in his first season at the club in 2020/2021.

== Personal life ==
=== European Parliament ===
Ignazio Cocchiere combined his professional football career with academic activities, studying at university in many of the countries he played. Having successfully combined his studies with practicing his sport full-time, he continued combining both careers also after graduation. In Brussels he found a job working at the European Parliament, where he has worked for more than four years. In his interview with Eurosport on 25 April 2017, he recommended all young football players to keep an alternative career path in mind and stressed that his job in the European Parliament was another reason he expects to be playing football in Belgium the years to come. As a result of playing for local club Royale Union Saint-Gilloise and working in the so-called 'Brussels Bubble', Cocchiere has become well known in the local scene, resulting regularly in a lot of media coverage.

=== European Commission ===
Cocchiere went on to work for the European Commission in 2018, specialising in European sports policy. After a short stint at the European Commission's communication service, he joined the cabinet of the European Commissioner for Climate, Net Zero and Clean Growth, Wopke Hoekstra.
