= Marten Wilmots =

Belgian footballer

Personal information
- Full name: Marten Gert Wilmots
- Date of birth: 29 January 1999; 27 years ago
- Place of birth: Belgium
- Positions: Midfielder; forward

Senior career*
Years	Team	Apps	(Gls)
–2018	Standard Liège	0	(0)
2018-2020	Ferencvárosi TC	0	(0)
2020	NK Triglav Kranj	12	(0)
2021–2023	URSL Visé	59	(10)
2023–2025	NK Triglav Kranj	50	(3)
- * Club domestic league appearances and goals

Marten Gert Wilmots (born 29 January 1999 in Belgium) is a Belgian former footballer who plays as a Midfielder and Forward.

== Career ==
After failing to make an appearance for Standard Liège, one of Belgium's most successful clubs, Wilmots wanted to go abroad with U.S. Avellino 1912 in the Italian lower leagues but the transfer never happened.

In 2018, he signed for Ferencvárosi TC, the most successful Hungarian team, but failed to make an appearance there before joining NK Triglav Kranj in the Slovenian top flight.

He is the son of former Belgium international Marc and elder brother of RFC Liège Reno Wilmots.
