= Aaron Dhondt =

Belgian footballer

Personal information
- Date of birth: 18 December 1995 (age 30)
- Place of birth: Belgium
- Height: 1.76 m (5 ft 9 in)
- Position: Winger

Team information
- Current team: Mandel United
- Number: 11

Youth career
- Club Brugge
- 2014–2015: Cercle Brugge

Senior career*
| Years | Team | Apps | (Gls) |
| 2015–2016 | Mandel United | | |
| 2016–2018 | Waasland-Beveren | 11 | (0) |
| 2017–2018 | → Knokke (loan) | 33 | (10) |
| 2018–2019 | Knokke | 17 | (1) |
| 2019–2022 | Mandel United | 64 | (5) |
| 2022–2024 | Gullegem | 62 | (23) |
| 2024– | Mandel United | 29 | (3) |
- * Club domestic league appearances and goals as of 13:41, 21 January 2026 (UTC)

Aaron Dhondt (born 18 December 1995) is a Belgian professional footballer who plays as a winger for RFC Mandel United.

== Professional career ==
Dhondt transferred to Waasland-Beveren from KFC Izegem in the Belgian Third Division after he scored 11 goals in the 2015/2016 season. Dhondt made his professional debut in the last minute of a 0–0 tie of Waasland-Bevern with Genk on 7 February 2017.

On 31 January 2019, Dhondt joined KFC Mandel United.
