= Michaël Lallemand =

Belgian footballer

Personal information
- Date of birth: 11 March 1993 (age 33)
- Place of birth: Eupen, Belgium
- Height: 1.81 m (5 ft 11 in)
- Position: Forward

Team information
- Current team: Stockay
- Number: 13

Senior career*
Years	Team	Apps	(Gls)
2010–2012	Standard Liège B		
2011–2012	→ Eupen (loan)	28	(1)
2012–2015	Eupen	89	(28)
2015–2018	KV Kortrijk	6	(0)
2016–2017	→ Antwerp (loan)	21	(3)
2017–2018	→ Deinze (loan)	14	(3)
2018–2019	Deinze	32	(7)
2019–2022	RFC Liège	59	(12)
2022–2025	Dender	52	(8)
2025–	Stockay	31	(7)
- * Club domestic league appearances and goals as of 28 June 2026

Michaël Lallemand (born 11 February 1993) is a Belgian footballer who plays for Stockay in the third-tier Belgian Division 1.
