= Niels De Schutter =

Belgian footballer

Personal information
- Date of birth: 8 August 1988 (age 38)
- Place of birth: Dendermonde, Belgium
- Height: 1.81 m (5 ft 11 1/2 in)
- Position: Left back

Team information
- Current team: Ninove
- Number: 20

Youth career
- 1994–1997: FC Juventus Schoonaarde
- 1997–2002: Eendracht Aalst
- 2002–2007: Lokeren

Senior career*
Years	Team	Apps	(Gls)
2007–2011	Eendracht Aalst	59	(2)
2011–2016	Oostende	93	(5)
2016–2018	Waasland-Beveren	23	(0)
2018–2021	Deinze	59	(0)
2021–	Ninove	0	(0)
- * Club domestic league appearances and goals as of 21:23, 4 May 2021 (UTC)

Niels De Schutter (born 8 August 1988) is a Belgian footballer who plays as a defender for Ninove .
