= Mathias Bossaerts =

Belgian footballer

Personal information
- Full name: Mathias Bossaerts
- Date of birth: 10 July 1996 (age 30)
- Place of birth: Brasschaat, Belgium
- Height: 1.84 m (6 ft 1/2 in)
- Position: Centre back

Youth career
- –2010: Beerschot AC
- 2010–2012: Anderlecht
- 2012–2016: Manchester City

Senior career*
Years	Team	Apps	(Gls)
2016–2018	K.V. Oostende	10	(1)
2018–2019	NEC	26	(2)

International career
2011	Belgium U15	7	(0)
2011–2012	Belgium U16	2	(1)
2012–2013	Belgium U17	11	(0)
2013–2015	Belgium U19	9	(1)
2016–2018	Belgium U21	4	(0)
- * Club domestic league appearances and goals as of 13:20, 11 January 2020 (UTC)

Mathias Bossaerts (born 10 July 1996) is a Belgian former professional footballer. He played as a center back.

== Career ==
Bossaerts was a regular player of the Belgian international youth teams. He joined K.V. Oostende in 2016 from Manchester City, and made his Belgian Pro League debut on 27 August 2016 against Waasland-Beveren.

In 2022, he decided to end his professional football career at the age of 25.
