= Dylan Ragolle =

Belgian footballer (born 1994)

Personal information
- Date of birth: 11 May 1994 (age 32)
- Place of birth: Tournai, Belgium
- Height: 1.85 m (6 ft 1 in)
- Position: Defensive midfielder

Team information
- Current team: RAEC Mons
- Number: 5

Senior career*
Years	Team	Apps	(Gls)
2011–2015	Kortrijk	16	(0)
2015–2016	Roeselare	17	(0)
2016–2018	Beerschot Wilrijk	6	(0)
2018–2019	Wallonia Walhain	15	(0)
2019–2024	Dender EH	87	(1)
2024–	RAEC Mons	26	(0)

International career
2013	Belgium U19	1	(0)
- * Club domestic league appearances and goals as of 28 June 2026

Dylan Ragolle (born 11 May 1994) is a Belgian footballer who plays for RAEC Mons.
