= Niels Coussement =

Belgian footballer (born 1991)

Personal information
- Full name: Niels Fabunni Coussement
- Date of birth: 2 February 1991 (age 35)
- Place of birth: Ostend, Belgium
- Height: 1.78 m (5 ft 10 in)
- Position: Right-back

Youth career
- 1997–2009: Oostende

Senior career*
Years	Team	Apps	(Gls)
2009–2016	Oostende	123	(2)
2015–2016	→ Roeselare (loan)	20	(0)
2016–2018	Cercle Brugge	21	(0)
2017–2018	→ Knokke (loan)	22	(0)
2018–2022	Zwevezele	55+	(1+)
Total		241+	(3+)
- * Club domestic league appearances and goals

Niels Fabunni Coussement (born 2 February 1991) is a Belgian former professional footballer who played as a wide midfielder or full-back. He spent the majority of his career with Oostende, where he rose from the youth ranks to the first team. Coussement was known for his versatility on both flanks, capable of playing in defense or midfield. He later had spells at Cercle Brugge and amateur side Zwevezele, retiring in 2022 after a 13-year senior career.

== Career ==
=== Oostende ===
Coussement joined the Oostende academy at age 6 and progressed through the youth system. He made his senior debut for Oostende on 19 August 2009 in a Belgian Second Division match against RWDM Brussels. On 21 February 2010, he scored his first senior goal, the lone goal in a 1–0 victory over Turnhout. As a regular on the left flank, Coussement became a key player for Oostende in the second tier. He helped the club win promotion to the Belgian Pro League in 2013, playing an integral role as the team became second-division champions.

After Oostende's promotion, Coussement struggled with injuries during the 2013–14 season. He signed a two-year contract extension in March 2014 with an option for a third year despite a "pechjaar" (year of bad luck) in which he spent much time sidelined. Coussement eventually made his top-flight debut on 8 March 2014, coming on as a late substitute in a match against Kortrijk. By 2014–15, Oostende had invested in many new players under chairman Marc Coucke, and Coussement's first-team opportunities became limited. In the final year of his Oostende contract, he acknowledged the increased competition but affirmed his commitment to fight for a place, noting that although he could play as a right midfielder, he primarily focused on the wing-back position.

In August 2015, Oostende decided to loan Coussement out for regular playing time. He was sent to Roeselare in the Belgian Second Division on a season-long loan. Coussement had previously played in that league with Oostende and was returning to familiar ground. He made 20 appearances for Roeselare during the 2015–16 season and, upon the loan's expiry, parted ways with Oostende when his contract ran out in June 2016.

=== Cercle Brugge ===
Ahead of the 2016–17 season, Coussement signed with Cercle Brugge, then a second-tier club (Belgian First Division B). He joined Cercle on a free transfer in June 2016, agreeing to a two-year contract with an option for an additional year. Cercle Brugge described Coussement as a polyvalent (versatile) player who could be deployed in both defense and midfield, and his signing was seen as part of the club's push for promotion. Coussement became a regular in Cercle's lineup during the 2016–17 season, making 21 league appearances. However, the club fell short of promotion that year.

In the summer of 2017, Cercle decided to loan Coussement out to give him more playing opportunities. On 4 August 2017, he moved to Knokke on a one-year loan. Knokke competed in the First Amateur Division (third tier) at the time. Coussement was a starting defender for Knokke throughout the 2017–18 campaign, helping the team in its debut season at that level. Meanwhile, his parent club Cercle Brugge went on to win the 2017–18 First Division B championship and secure promotion to the top flight, though Coussement was not involved with Cercle's first team that season due to the loan.

After his loan at Knokke, Coussement's contract with Cercle Brugge expired in mid-2018. Having spent two years with Cercle, he left the professional ranks and signed permanently with amateur club Zwevezele ahead of the 2018–19 season.

=== Later career and retirement ===
Coussement joined Zwevezele, an ambitious amateur club in West Flanders, in 2018. He became a veteran presence in the team, which competed in the Belgian Provincial Leagues. After several seasons at Zwevezele—who had at that time been promoted to the Belgian Second Amateur Division—he announced that the club would be the final stop of his playing career. In 2022, at age 31, Coussement decided to retire from football, stating, "For me, Zwevezele will be the final station," and reflecting that he could look back on "a beautiful career." His retirement coincided with his growing family responsibilities, as he prepared to become a father for the second time.

== Career statistics ==
Appearances and goals by club, season and competition
Club	Season	League			Cup		Other		Total	
Club	Season	Division	Apps	Goals	Apps	Goals	Apps	Goals	Apps	Goals
Oostende	2009–10	Belgian Second Division	29	1	0	0	—		29	1
Oostende	2010–11	Belgian Second Division	22	0	0	0	—		22	0
Oostende	2011–12	Belgian Second Division	32	1	2	0	5 (Note: Appearances in Belgian Second Division promotion play-offs)	0	39	0
Oostende	2012–13	Belgian Second Division	15	0	4	0	—		19	0
Oostende	2013–14	Belgian Pro League	8	0	0	0	—		8	0
Oostende	2014–15	Belgian Pro League	17	0	2	0	—		19	0
Oostende	Total		123	2	8	0	5	0	136	2
Roeselare (loan)	2015–16	Belgian Second Division	20	0	0	0	—		20	0
Cercle Brugge	2016–17	Belgian First Division B	21	0	2	0	—		23	0
Knokke (loan)	2017–18	First Amateur Division	22	0	1	0	—		23	0
Zwevezele	2018–19	Third Amateur Division	?	?	?	?	—		?	?
Zwevezele	2019–20	Second Amateur Division	23	1	0	0	—		23	1
Zwevezele	2020–21 (Note: Season curtailed due to COVID-19 pandemic in Belgium)	Belgian Division 2	2	0	0	0	—		2	0
Zwevezele	2021–22	Belgian Division 2	30	0	0	0	—		30	0
Zwevezele	Total		55+	1+	0	0	—		55+	1+
Career total			241+	3+	11	0	5	0	257+	3+

== Honours ==
Oostende

- Belgian Second Division: 2012–13
