= François Marquet =

Belgian footballer

Personal information
- Date of birth: 17 April 1995 (age 31)
- Place of birth: Theux, Belgium
- Height: 1.73 m (5 ft 8 in)
- Position: Central midfielder

Youth career
- 2003–2005: RAF Franchimontois
- 2005–2013: Standard Liège

Senior career*
Years	Team	Apps	(Gls)
2013–2016	Standard Liège	4	(0)
2015	→ Jong PSV (loan)	13	(1)
2015–2016	→ Mouscron-Péruwelz (loan)	26	(0)
2016–2018	Waasland-Beveren	23	(1)
2018–2021	Oostende	33	(1)
2021–2023	FC U Craiova	32	(0)

International career^{‡}
2010	Belgium U15	1	(0)
2012	Belgium U17	5	(0)
2013	Belgium U18	3	(0)
2013–2014	Belgium U19	10	(1)
- * Club domestic league appearances and goals as of 28 October 2022 ‡ National team caps and goals as of 2 June 2014

François Marquet (born 17 April 1995) is a Belgian footballer who plays as a midfielder.

== Career ==
He signed his first professional contract for Standard Liège in April 2013. On 19 May 2013, he made his debut in the Belgian Pro League against Lokeren. He started the game and played the first half. He's a youth exponent from the club. On 3 January 2015, it was announced that PSV Eindhoven had loaned Marquet, with the possibility to sign him permanently included. However, PSV decided against this option, with the result Marquet returned to Standard Liège at the end of the season.

On 18 August 2021, he signed with FC U Craiova in Romania.
