= Timo Cauwenberg =

Belgian footballer

Personal information
- Full name: Timo Kathleen Cauwenberg
- Date of birth: 2 October 1994 (age 32)
- Place of birth: Sint-Truiden, Belgium
- Height: 1.75 m (5 ft 9 in)
- Position: Left-back

Team information
- Current team: KVK Wellen
- Number: 3

Youth career
- –2013: Sint-Truiden

Senior career*
Years	Team	Apps	(Gls)
2013–2014	Sint-Truiden	1	(0)
2014–2016	ASV Geel	56	(7)
2016–2020	Lommel	96	(1)
2020–2021	Lierse	21	(0)
2021–2023	Belisia Bilzen	51	(4)
2023–2024	Sporting Hasselt	38	(1)
2025–	KVK Wellen	13	(0)
- * Club domestic league appearances and goals as of 08:45, 25 January 2026 (UTC)

Timo Kathleen Cauwenberg (born 2 October 1994) is a Belgian footballer who plays as a left back for KVK Wellen.
