= Charni Ekangamene =

Belgian footballer (born 1994)

Personal information
- Full name: Charni Ekangamene
- Date of birth: 16 February 1994 (age 32)
- Place of birth: Antwerp, Belgium
- Height: 1.80 m (5 ft 11 in)
- Positions: Midfielder; left-back

Team information
- Current team: Berchem Sport
- Number: 6

Youth career
- Royal Antwerp
- 2009–2013: Manchester United

Senior career*
| Years | Team | Apps | (Gls) |
| 2013–2014 | Manchester United | 0 | (0) |
| 2014 | → Carlisle United (loan) | 4 | (0) |
| 2014–2017 | Zulte Waregem | 16 | (0) |
| 2016 | → OH Leuven (loan) | 0 | (0) |
| 2016–2017 | → NAC Breda (loan) | 2 | (0) |
| 2017–2018 | Beerschot Wilrijk | 3 | (0) |
| 2018–2019 | Eindhoven | 11 | (0) |
| 2019 | Inter Bratislava | 7 | (0) |
| 2019–2021 | Marino | 42 | (1) |
| 2021–2022 | St Joseph's | 7 | (0) |
| 2022 | Lokeren-Temse | 9 | (0) |
| 2022–2023 | Rupel Boom | 4 | (0) |
| 2023– | Berchem Sport | 53 | (1) |

International career
| 2009 | Belgium U15 | 4 | (0) |
| 2012 | Belgium U19 | 2 | (0) |
| 2015 | Belgium U21 | 1 | (0) |
- * Club domestic league appearances and goals as of 02:39, 26 January 2026 (UTC)

Charni Ekangamene (born 16 February 1994) is a Belgian professional footballer who plays as a midfielder for Berchem Sport in the Belgian Division 2.

Born in Antwerp, he began his career with Royal Antwerp before moving to their English sister club, Manchester United, in 2010. Having failed to break into the first-team, he was loaned to Carlisle United in January 2014, before making a permanent move back to Belgium with Zulte Waregem in July 2014.

== Club career ==
Born in Antwerp, Ekangamene began his career with local club Royal Antwerp. As a result of the club's partnership with Manchester United, Ekangamene went on trial with the English club twice in late 2008 before agreeing in March 2009 to join them permanently once he turned 16 in February 2010. He made his debut for the Manchester United reserves on 26 April 2010, coming on for Michael Keane in the 76th minute of a 1–0 defeat to Wigan Athletic. The following season, he was a regular in the under-18s, making 18 appearances out of a possible 28, as well as appearing three times for the reserves, including one start in the Manchester Senior Cup – a 6–1 win over Rochdale on 3 February 2011.

Ekangamene continued in the under-18s the following season, and scored his first goal for Manchester United on 5 November 2011 in a 2–1 win over Bolton Wanderers. His only reserve team appearance of the season came in the semi-finals of the Lancashire Senior Cup against Blackpool on 1 May 2012; the match went to a penalty shoot-out after it finished goalless in normal time, and Ekangamene scored the winning penalty with a delicate chip over the diving goalkeeper to put Manchester United through to the final. In 2012–13, Ekangamene graduated to the reserves on a full-time basis, and was again a regular in the side, playing 19 times in all competitions; he also scored his first goal for the reserves on 20 March 2013, getting the opening goal in the 40th minute of a 2–1 defeat to Arsenal.

After making 13 appearances in the first half of the 2013–14 season, on 31 January 2014, Ekangamene and teammate Sam Byrne were loaned to Carlisle United. He made his professional debut the next day, starting the game against Bristol City. Although the loan was due to last until the end of the season, a lack of centre-backs meant Manchester United were forced to recall Ekangamene to play in an unfamiliar position after only a month. After his return, he was ever-present for the under-21s and even scored in their penalty shoot-out defeat by Bolton Wanderers in the quarter-finals of the Lancashire Senior Cup on 17 March 2014. His performances during the season led to a nomination for the Denzil Haroun Reserve Player of the Year award, but he was ultimately beaten in the fan vote by Saidy Janko.

On 11 July 2014, Ekangamene left Manchester United to join Belgian club Zulte Waregem on a four-year deal. He made his debut on 17 July, coming on as an 87th-minute substitute for Mamoutou N'Diaye in Zulte Waregem's 2–1 win over Polish side Zawisza Bydgoszcz in the second qualifying round of the 2014–15 UEFA Europa League. He then made his league debut on 27 July, coming on for Chuks Aneke in the 83rd minute of Zulte Waregem's 2–0 derby win over Kortrijk.

On 29 January 2019, Ekangamene joined FK Inter Bratislava in the DOXXbet liga after a trial at the club. After a two-year spell at CD Marino, he signed for St Joseph's in August 2021.
