= Jason Adesanya =

Belgian footballer (born 1993)

Personal information
- Date of birth: 26 May 1993 (age 33)
- Place of birth: Uccle, Belgium
- Height: 1.88 m (6 ft 2 in)
- Position: Forward

Team information
- Current team: Lyra-Lierse
- Number: 11

Youth career
- Lierse

Senior career*
Years	Team	Apps	(Gls)
2010–2013	Lierse	28	(3)
2013–2014	ASV Geel	32	(12)
2014–2016	Mechelen	16	(1)
2015	→ Lommel United (loan)	12	(4)
2015–2016	→ Royal Antwerp (loan)	5	(0)
2016–2017	Lommel United	12	(1)
2017–2018	Rupel Boom		
2018–2019	Heist	15	(1)
2019–	Lyra-Lierse	120	(30)

International career
2011	Belgium U18	5	(2)
2011	Belgium U19	6	(1)
2012	Belgium U20	1	(0)
2012	Belgium U21	2	(0)
- * Club domestic league appearances and goals as of 7 May 2025

Jason Adesanya (born 26 May 1993) is a Belgian footballer who currently plays for K Lyra-Lierse Berlaar.

== Career ==
On 17 May 2019 K Lyra-Lierse Berlaar announced, that Adesanya would join the club for the 2019/20 season.
