= Mehdi Khchab =

Belgian footballer

Personal information
- Full name: Mehdi Khchab
- Date of birth: 14 August 1991 (age 35)
- Place of birth: Charleroi, Belgium
- Height: 1.77 m (5 ft 9 1/2 in)
- Position: Right-back

Youth career
- –2011: Charleroi SC

Senior career*
Years	Team	Apps	(Gls)
2010–2012	Charleroi SC	1	(0)
2012–2013	RE Virton	27	(3)
2013–2014	RCC Fleurus	5	(1)
2014–2015	RAEC Mons	32	(0)
2015–2016	KRC Mechelen	22	(2)
2016–2017	Cercle Brugge KSV	21	(0)
- * Club domestic league appearances and goals as of 08:01, 17 October 2017 (UTC)

Mehdi Khchab (born 14 August 1991) is a Belgian footballer who is currently playing for RSC Andenne. He last played for Cercle Brugge KSV in the Belgian First Division B as a right-back.
