= Reno Wilmots =

Belgian soccer player

Personal information
- Full name: Reno Johan C. Wilmots
- Date of birth: 16 March 1997 (age 29)
- Place of birth: Belgium
- Height: 1.82 m (6 ft 0 in)
- Position: Midfielder

Team information
- Current team: RFC Liège
- Number: 28

Senior career*
Years	Team	Apps	(Gls)
2015–2017	Sint-Truiden	2	(0)
2017–2018	Roeselare	1	(0)
2018	Avellino	6	(0)
2018–2019	Carpi	2	(0)
2019–2020	Bisceglie	7	(0)
2020	Triglav	11	(0)
2021–2023	URSL Visé	54	(5)
2023–2024	RFC Liège	27	(3)
2024–2025	Patro Eisden	25	(1)
2025–	RFC Liège	27	(0)

International career^{‡}
2016	Belgium U19	3	(0)
- * Club domestic league appearances and goals as of 19 April 2026 ‡ National team caps and goals as of 25 March 2016

Reno Johan C. Wilmots (born 16 March 1997) is a Belgian footballer who plays for Challenger Pro League club RFC Liège. His father is Marc Wilmots, former manager of Belgium's national football team and his younger brother is Marten Wilmots, former footballer.

== Club career ==
On 29 August 2018, he joined Serie B club Carpi, signing a two-year contract with an additional one-year extension option.

On 13 August 2019, he moved to Bisceglie.

On 13 January 2020, Reno and his brother Marten Wilmots signed with Slovenian club Triglav.

On 17 June 2023, Wilmots signed a two-year contract with RFC Liège.

In 2024, Wilmots joined with Patro Eisden.

On 13 August 2025, Wilmots returned to RFC Liège, signing a two-year contract.

== Career statistics ==
As of match played 7 January 2018

Appearances and goals by club, season and competition
Club	Season	League			National Cup		Other		Total	
Club	Season	Division	Apps	Goals	Apps	Goals	Apps	Goals	Apps	Goals
Sint-Truiden	2015–16	Pro League	2	0	0	0	—		2	0
Roeselare	2017–18	First Division B	1	0	1	0	—		2	0
Career total			3	0	1	0	0	0	4	0
