= KSKV Zwevezele =

Association football club in Belgium

Zwevezele
- Full name: Koninklijke Sportkring Voorwaarts Zwevezele
- Founded: 1957
- Ground: Sportcomplex Zwevezele, Zwevezele
- Capacity: 1,500
- League: Belgian Third Provincial
Home colours

Koninklijke Sportkring Voorwaarts Zwevezele is a football club based in Zwevezele, West Flanders, Belgium. The club is affiliated to the Royal Belgian Football Association (KBVB) with matricule 6039 and has yellow and black as club colours.

== Recent history ==
The first women's team was promoted to the Belgian Women's First Division for the first time in the 2018–19 season.

In 2018, the men's team won the Belgian First Provincial and gained promotion to the national divisions. During the 2018–19 season, the club won both the first and third period titles in the Belgian Third Amateur Division A, earning a place in the promotion play-offs. Victories over Sint-Lenaarts and Lyra-Lierse secured promotion to the Belgian Second Amateur Division—the club's fifth promotion in six seasons.

Following promotion, former Belgian international Stijn De Smet joined the club, alongside several other former professional players, including Vincent Provoost, Hans Cornelis, Stijn Minne, Niels Coussement and Tim Smolders.

On 21 January 2022, Zwevezele announced its withdrawal from the Belgian national divisions after electing not to renew its license for the 2022–23 season.

In March 2023, the club confirmed that chairman and long-time benefactor Paul Degroote would step down after a decade in charge. Players were informed they were free to join other clubs, and the team announced it would restart in the Fourth Provincial Division, the lowest tier of Belgian football, for the 2023–24 season.
