= 2026–27 Flemish Cup =

Inaugural season of the Flemish Cup

Beker van Vlaanderen 2026–27

Tournament details
- Country: Belgium
- Dates: 25 July 2026 – 1 May 2027
- Teams: 80

The 2026–27 Flemish Cup (known in Dutch as the Beker van Vlaanderen 2026–27) is the first edition of the Flemish Cup, a new football cup competition organised by Voetbal Vlaanderen together with VACHA (Vlaamse Amateurclubs van de Hogere Afdelingen) for clubs from the higher amateur divisions of Flanders. As this is the inaugural edition of the competition, there are no defending champions.

The competition features 80 clubs from Voetbal Vlaanderen's First, Second and Third national divisions. Note that this season there are 81 clubs total due to the Belgian Division 3 VV B exceptionally having 17 teams following the addition of Lommel U23. However, before the competition started Young Reds Antwerp had already forfeited causing only 80 teams to officially take part, as was intended, making all groups equal in number of teams. After the draw however, before the competition started, OH Leuven U23 also forfeited, all their Group D matches defaulting to 0-5 losses, but they are included in the standings as if having taken part. The group stage runs from late July to mid-August 2026, with the knockout phase beginning with the round of 16 on 19 August 2026 and concluding with the final on 1 May 2027.

== Format ==
The 80 participating clubs are divided into four groups of 20 (Groups A, B, C and D), drawn up geographically. Each club plays two home and two away matches in the group phase, and the top four finishers in each group advance to a 16-club knockout phase. From the round of 16 onward, all ties are single matches decided by a penalty shoot-out if level after 90 minutes, with no extra time.

== Group stage ==
Matchday 1 is scheduled to be played on the weekend of 25–26 July 2026, followed by matchday 2 on 29 July, matchday 3 on 5 August and matchday 4 on 12 August 2026.

Number of teams per tier still in competition
Division 1 VV	Division 2 VV	Division 3 VV	Total
16 / 16	31 / 32	33 / 33	80 / 81

Group standings are decided, in order, by: points; wins; goal difference; goals scored; away wins; away goal difference; and away goals scored.

=== Tables ===
==== Group A ====
Pos	Team	Pld	W	D	L	GF	GA	GD	Pts	Qualification
1	Zelzate	4	4	0	0	21	6	+15	12	Advance to the round of 16
2	Diksmuide-Oostende	4	4	0	0	10	4	+6	12	Advance to the round of 16
3	Jong Cercle^{U23}	4	3	0	1	12	2	+10	9	Advance to the round of 16
4	Jong Essevee^{U23}	4	3	0	1	11	8	+3	9	Advance to the round of 16
5	Roeselare	4	3	0	1	9	8	+1	9	
6	Mandel United	4	2	2	0	8	2	+6	8	
7	Ieper	4	2	1	1	7	5	+2	7	
8	Oostkamp	4	2	0	2	12	8	+4	6	
9	Sparta Deinze	4	2	0	2	7	5	+2	6	
10	Rumbeke	4	2	0	2	10	9	+1	6	
11	Zwevegem	4	2	0	2	7	9	−2	6	
12	Drongen	4	2	0	2	5	9	−4	6	
13	Gullegem	4	1	1	2	3	4	−1	4	
14	RC Gent	4	1	0	3	6	5	+1	3	
15	Blankenberge	4	1	0	3	7	8	−1	3	
16	St-Denijs Sport	4	1	0	3	6	9	−3	3	
17	Harelbeke	4	1	0	3	2	8	−6	3 (Note: Away matches won: Harelbeke 1, Torhout 0.)	
18	Torhout	4	1	0	3	2	8	−6	3	
19	Knokke	4	1	0	3	4	21	−17	3	
20	WS Lauwe	4	0	0	4	3	14	−11	0	

Source: Voetbalexpress
Rules for classification: Tiebreakers

==== Group B ====
Pos	Team	Pld	W	D	L	GF	GA	GD	Pts	Qualification
1	Jong KV Mechelen^{U23}	4	4	0	0	12	4	+8	12	Advance to the round of 16
2	Oudenaarde	4	4	0	0	9	1	+8	12	Advance to the round of 16
3	Voorde-Appelterre	4	3	1	0	12	3	+9	10	Advance to the round of 16
4	Avanti Stekene	4	3	1	0	9	3	+6	10	Advance to the round of 16
5	Ninove	4	2	2	0	8	3	+5	8	
6	Lebbeke	4	2	1	1	4	4	0	7	
7	Olsa Brakel	4	2	0	2	6	5	+1	6	
8	Elene Grotenberge	4	2	0	2	5	5	0	6	
9	Huldenberg	4	2	0	2	5	9	−4	6	
10	Merelbeke	4	1	3	0	2	1	+1	6	
11	Elewijt	4	1	2	1	9	7	+2	5	
12	Diegem	4	1	2	1	4	4	0	5	
13	Overijse	4	1	1	2	5	5	0	4	
14	Londerzeel	4	0	4	0	4	4	0	4	
15	Kalken	4	1	0	3	6	9	−3	3	
16	Eendracht Aalst Lede	4	1	0	3	8	14	−6	3	
17	Erpe-Mere United	4	1	0	3	7	14	−7	3	
18	Wetteren	4	0	1	3	2	6	−4	1	
19	Hamme	4	0	0	4	3	11	−8	0	
20	Wambeek Ternat	4	0	0	4	6	14	−8	0	

Source: Voetbalexpress
Rules for classification: Tiebreakers

==== Group C ====
Pos	Team	Pld	W	D	L	GF	GA	GD	Pts	Qualification
1	Lyra-Lierse	4	4	0	0	16	5	+11	12	Advance to the round of 16
2	Dessel Sport	4	4	0	0	9	2	+7	12	Advance to the round of 16
3	Rupel Boom	4	3	1	0	9	4	+5	10	Advance to the round of 16
4	Racing Mechelen	4	3	0	1	10	4	+6	9	Advance to the round of 16
5	Lille United	4	3	0	1	8	3	+5	9	
6	Berchem Sport	4	2	2	0	8	5	+3	8	
7	Wezel Sport	4	2	1	1	15	4	+11	7	
8	Hoogstraten	4	2	1	1	12	7	+5	7	
9	Turnhout	4	2	1	1	11	9	+2	7	
10	Heist	4	2	0	2	10	5	+5	6	
11	Cappellen	4	2	0	2	9	14	−5	6	
12	City Pirates	4	1	1	2	8	9	−1	4	
13	Nieuwmoer	4	1	1	2	4	6	−2	4	
14	Sint-Lenaarts	4	1	1	2	6	11	−5	4	
15	Berg en Dal	4	1	1	2	2	7	−5	4	
16	Wilrijk	4	0	2	2	4	8	−4	2	
17	De Kempen	4	0	1	3	2	5	−3	1	
18	Houtvenne	4	0	1	3	3	7	−4	1	
19	Nijlen	4	0	0	4	5	17	−12	0	
20	Geel	4	0	0	4	1	20	−19	0	

Source: Voetbalexpress
Rules for classification: Tiebreakers

==== Group D ====
(Note: All matches involving OH Leuven U23^{U23} are awarded 5–0 by forfeit following the club's withdrawal from the competition before Matchday 1.)

Pos	Team	Pld	W	D	L	GF	GA	GD	Pts	Qualification
1	Tienen	4	4	0	0	14	3	+11	12	Advance to the round of 16
2	STVV Youth^{U23}	4	3	0	1	11	2	+9	9	Advance to the round of 16
3	Rotselaar	4	3	0	1	10	3	+7	9	Advance to the round of 16
4	Linden	4	3	0	1	11	5	+6	9	Advance to the round of 16
5	Thes	4	3	0	1	8	3	+5	9	
6	Zepperen-Brustem	4	2	1	1	7	2	+5	7	
7	Lommel U23^{U23}	4	2	1	1	12	8	+4	7	
8	Belisia Bilzen	4	2	1	1	8	5	+3	7	
9	Schoonbeek-Bilzen	4	2	0	2	8	9	−1	6	
10	Tongeren	4	1	2	1	8	7	+1	5	
11	Esperanza Pelt	4	1	2	1	11	11	0	5	
12	Hades	4	1	2	1	9	9	0	5	
13	Termien	4	1	2	1	7	8	−1	5	
14	ATO	4	1	1	2	8	8	0	4	
15	Bree-Beek	4	1	1	2	9	11	−2	4	
16	Achel	4	1	0	3	5	13	−8	3	
17	Wellen	4	1	0	3	3	11	−8	3	
18	Bocholt	4	0	2	2	8	13	−5	2	
19	Betekom	4	0	1	3	6	12	−6	1	
20	OH Leuven U23^{U23}	4	0	0	4	0	20	−20	0	

Updated to match(es) played on completed. Source: Voetbalexpress
Rules for classification: Tiebreakers

=== Results Summary ===
(Note: All matches involving OH Leuven U23^{U23} were awarded 5–0 by forfeit following the club's withdrawal from the competition before Matchday 1.)

==== Matchday 1 ====
Group A
Home team	Score	Away team
RC Gent	1–2	Jong Essevee^{U23}
Zwevegem	1–4	Diksmuide-Oostende
Gullegem	2–1	Ieper
Oostkamp	0–5	Jong Cercle^{U23}
Sparta Deinze	2–0	Torhout
WS Lauwe	1–3	Roeselare
Mandel United	2–0	St-Denijs Sport
Harelbeke	0–2	Drongen
Zelzate	9–2	Knokke
Blankenberge	1–4	Rumbeke

Group C
Home team	Score	Away team
Hoogstraten	0–4	Racing Mechelen
Nieuwmoer	1–2	Cappellen
Geel	0–8	Wezel Sport
Turnhout	1–1	De Kempen
Lyra-Lierse	4–2	Nijlen
Dessel Sport	3–0	Berg en Dal
Wilrijk	1–2	Rupel Boom
City Pirates	1–1	Berchem Sport
Houtvenne	0–1	Heist
Lille United	3–1	Sint-Lenaarts

Group B
Home team	Score	Away team
Eendracht Aalst Lede	5–1	Erpe-Mere United
Elewijt	2–2	Londerzeel
Hamme	1–2	Avanti Stekene
Wambeek Ternat	2–3	Jong KV Mechelen^{U23}
Diegem	2–0	Lebbeke
Elene Grotenberge	2–1	Olsa Brakel
Kalken	0–2	Oudenaarde
Wetteren	0–1	Voorde-Appelterre
Merelbeke	1–1	Ninove
Overijse	2–0	Huldenberg

Group D
Home team	Score	Away team
Esperanza Pelt	2–2	Hades
Thes	1–0	Wellen
Bocholt	2–3	Achel
Bree-Beek	4–4	Lommel U23^{U23}
Betekom	0–3	Rotselaar
Belisia Bilzen	3–0	Termien
STVV Youth^{U23}	5–1	Tongeren
OH Leuven U23^{U23}	0–5	Linden
Tienen	3–2	ATO
Zepperen-Brustem	1–0	Schoonbeek-Bilzen

==== Matchday 2 ====
Group A
Home team	Score	Away team
Ieper	2–2	Mandel United
Torhout	0–3	Zelzate
Knokke	0–8	Oostkamp
St-Denijs Sport	1–2	Harelbeke
Jong Essevee^{U23}	4–2	WS Lauwe
Roeselare	0–4	Zwevegem
Diksmuide-Oostende	2–1	Blankenberge
Rumbeke	2–1	Gullegem
Jong Cercle^{U23}	2–1	RC Gent
Drongen	0–3	Sparta Deinze

Group C
Home team	Score	Away team
Rupel Boom	3–3	Hoogstraten
Cappellen	2–6	Lyra-Lierse
Nijlen	0–4	Lille United
Racing Mechelen	2–0	City Pirates
Berchem Sport	2–2	Wilrijk
Berg en Dal	0–4	Turnhout
Wezel Sport	1–2	Dessel Sport
De Kempen	0–1	Nieuwmoer
Heist	8–0	Geel
Sint-Lenaarts	2–1	Houtvenne

Group B
Home team	Score	Away team
Huldenberg	2–0	Diegem
Londerzeel	1–1	Overijse
Jong KV Mechelen^{U23}	4–1	Elewijt
Lebbeke	0–0	Merelbeke
Erpe-Mere United	2–1	Hamme
Olsa Brakel	1–0	Kalken
Oudenaarde	1–0	Elene Grotenberge
Avanti Stekene	1–1	Wetteren
Voorde-Appelterre	6–0	Eendracht Aalst Lede
Ninove	5–1	Wambeek Ternat

Group D
Home team	Score	Away team
ATO	3–1	Thes
Lommel U23^{U23}	4–0	Bocholt
Achel	1–3	Bree-Beek
Hades	0–2	STVV Youth^{U23}
Termien	2–2	Esperanza Pelt
Schoonbeek-Bilzen	3–1	Belisia Bilzen
Linden	0–2	Tienen
Rotselaar	5–0	OH Leuven U23^{U23}
Wellen	3–1	Betekom
Tongeren	1–1	Zepperen-Brustem

==== Matchday 3 ====
Group A
Home team	Score	Away team
Zwevegem	1–5	Jong Essevee^{U23}
WS Lauwe	0–5	Jong Cercle^{U23}
RC Gent	5–0	Knokke
Oostkamp	3–1	Torhout
Zelzate	5–1	Drongen
Sparta Deinze	1–2	St-Denijs Sport
Harelbeke	0–1	Ieper
Rumbeke	2–3	Diksmuide-Oostende
Blankenberge	1–2	Roeselare
Gullegem	0–0	Mandel United

Group C
Home team	Score	Away team
City Pirates	2–5	Cappellen
Lyra-Lierse	3–1	Heist
Lille United	0–2	Rupel Boom
Hoogstraten	4–0	Nijlen
Wilrijk	1–4	Racing Mechelen
Turnhout	1–5	Wezel Sport
Dessel Sport	2–1	De Kempen
Nieuwmoer	2–2	Sint-Lenaarts
Geel	0–2	Berg en Dal
Houtvenne	1–3	Berchem Sport

Group B
Home team	Score	Away team
Diegem	1–1	Londerzeel
Overijse	1–2	Ninove
Elewijt	6–1	Huldenberg
Merelbeke	1–0	Olsa Brakel
Hamme	0–2	Jong KV Mechelen^{U23}
Kalken	6–3	Erpe-Mere United
Elene Grotenberge	1–2	Lebbeke
Wetteren	0–1	Oudenaarde
Eendracht Aalst Lede	1–3	Avanti Stekene
Wambeek Ternat	2–4	Voorde-Appelterre

Group D
Home team	Score	Away team
Bocholt	3–3	Hades
Bree-Beek	0–2	Termien
Thes	5–0	Achel
Esperanza Pelt	4–3	Lommel U23^{U23}
Tienen	4–1	Schoonbeek-Bilzen
Belisia Bilzen	1–1	Tongeren
STVV Youth^{U23}	4–0	Wellen
OH Leuven U23^{U23}	0–5	Zepperen-Brustem
Rotselaar	2–1	ATO
Betekom	3–4	Linden

==== Matchday 4 ====
Group A
Home team	Score	Away team
Roeselare	4–2	Rumbeke
Diksmuide-Oostende	1–0	Gullegem
Mandel United	4–0	Harelbeke
Ieper	3–1	Sparta Deinze
St-Denijs Sport	3–4	Zelzate
Jong Cercle^{U23}	0–1	Zwevegem
Knokke	2–0	WS Lauwe
Torhout	1–0	RC Gent
Drongen	2–1	Oostkamp
Jong Essevee^{U23}	0–4	Blankenberge

Group C
Home team	Score	Away team
Cappellen	0–5	Hoogstraten
Heist	0–2	Dessel Sport
Rupel Boom	2–0	Nieuwmoer
Nijlen	3–5	Turnhout
Racing Mechelen	0–3	Lyra-Lierse
Wezel Sport	1–1	Houtvenne
De Kempen	0–1	Lille United
Sint-Lenaarts	1–5	City Pirates
Berg en Dal	0–0	Wilrijk
Berchem Sport	2–1	Geel

Group B
Home team	Score	Away team
Londerzeel	0–0	Merelbeke
Ninove	0–0	Elewijt
Huldenberg	2–1	Wambeek Ternat
Olsa Brakel	4–2	Eendracht Aalst Lede
Jong KV Mechelen^{U23}	3–1	Wetteren
Erpe-Mere United	1–2	Elene Grotenberge
Lebbeke	2–1	Overijse
Oudenaarde	5–1	Hamme
Avanti Stekene	3–0	Kalken
Voorde-Appelterre	1–1	Diegem

Group D
Home team	Score	Away team
ATO	2–2	Betekom
Hades	4–2	Bree-Beek
Termien	3–3	Bocholt
Schoonbeek-Bilzen	4–3	Esperanza Pelt
Lommel U23^{U23}	1–0	STVV Youth^{U23}
Achel	1–3	Belisia Bilzen
Wellen	0–5	Tienen
Linden	2–0	Rotselaar
Tongeren	5–0	OH Leuven U23^{U23}
Zepperen-Brustem	0–1	Thes

== Knockout phase ==
The four highest-placed clubs from Group A face the four highest-placed clubs from Group B in the round of 16, and likewise Group C against Group D; within each cross-group pairing the club ranked first plays the club ranked fourth and the club ranked second plays the club ranked third, with the higher-ranked club hosting. From the round of 16 onward every tie is a single match, decided by a penalty shoot-out if level after 90 minutes.

Round	Draw date	Date
Round of 16	—N/a	19 August 2026
Quarter-finals	8 September 2026	10–11 November 2026
Semi-finals	12 November 2026	3 January 2027
Final	—N/a	1 May 2027

=== Round of 16 ===
Number of teams per tier still in competition
Division 1 VV	Division 2 VV	Division 3 VV	Total
5 / 16	9 / 32	2 / 33	16 / 81

Round of 16
Team 1	Score	Team 2
Zelzate	5–0	Avanti Stekene
Diksmuide-Oostende	2–2 (4–5 p)	Voorde-Appelterre
Oudenaarde	3–0	Jong Cercle^{U23}
Jong KV Mechelen^{U23}	2–3	Jong Essevee^{U23}
Lyra-Lierse	5–3	Linden
Dessel Sport	3–1	Rotselaar
Tienen	4–0	Racing Mechelen
STVV Youth^{U23}	4–3	Rupel Boom

19 August 2026	Zelzate	5–0	Avanti Stekene	Zelzate
20:00 CEST	Chirishungu 7'; Gega 27', 41'; Raaymakers 47'; Capa 85'	Report		Stadium: Armand Seghers Complex

19 August 2026	Diksmuide-Oostende	2–2 (4–5 p)	Voorde-Appelterre	Diksmuide
20:00 CEST	Santens 58'; Deblieck 64'	Report	Geenens 48'; Lufulu-Onia 81'	Stadium: SV Diksmuide
	Penalties
	Santens (penalty scored); Willemyns (penalty scored); Vandenbussche (penalty missed); Gijdé (penalty scored); D'Haese (penalty scored)		(penalty scored) Mputu; (penalty scored) Tresignie; (penalty scored) Kamneng Djoum; (penalty scored) De Troyer; (penalty scored) Razzi

19 August 2026	Oudenaarde	3–0	Jong Cercle^{U23}	Oudenaarde
20:00 CEST	D'Hondt 52'; Vromant 58'; Van Meenen 70'	Report		Stadium: Burgemeester Thienpontstadion

19 August 2026	Jong KV Mechelen^{U23}	2–3	Jong Essevee^{U23}	Mechelen
20:00 CEST	Vermeersch 57'; Bucumi 75'	Report	Akpa-Chukwu 26'; Talini 17'; Obambi 53' (pen.)	Stadium: Jeugdvelden KV Mechelen

19 August 2026	Lyra-Lierse	5–3	Linden	Lier
20:00 CEST	R. Kil 14'; Durinck 25', 34'; Kokora 44'; S. Kil 69'	Report	Horemans 6' (o.g.); Tahara 17'; Justé 55'	Stadium: Sportpark Lier

19 August 2026	Dessel Sport	3–1	Rotselaar	Dessel
20:00 CEST	Vekemans 49', 51'; Troonbeeckx 63'	Report	Vannerom 55'	Stadium: Armand Melis Stadion

19 August 2026	Tienen	4–0	Racing Mechelen	Tienen
20:00 CEST	Marchal 5', 44'; El Harrak 7'; Boulhassane 19'	Report		Stadium: Bergéstadion

19 August 2026	STVV Youth^{U23}	4–3	Rupel Boom	Sint-Truiden
20:00 CEST	Pörtner 12' (o.g.); Sombi Kelo 42'; Habib 60', 78'	Report	Verbist 53'; Dirkx 55', 85'	Stadium: Jeugdcentrum Seminarie

=== Quarter-finals ===
The draw for the quarter-finals was made a few weeks after the completion of the Round of 16.

Number of teams per tier still in competition
Division 1 VV	Division 2 VV	Division 3 VV	Total
4 / 16	4 / 32	0 / 33	8 / 81

Quarter-finals
Team 1	Score	Team 2
Dessel Sport	5–0	Oudenaarde
Jong Essevee^{U23}	2–1	Zelzate
Tienen	1–0	STVV Youth^{U23}
Lyra-Lierse	3–0	Voorde-Appelterre

10 November 2026	Dessel Sport	5–0	Oudenaarde	Dessel
20:00 CET	Van Ballaer 34'; Vandersmissen 60'; Geukens 69', 78', 80'	Report		Stadium: Armand Melis Stadion

11 November 2026	Jong Essevee^{U23}	2–1	Zelzate	Zulte
15:00 CET	Deruijck 28' (pen.); Maertens 47'	Report	De Smet 61'	Stadium: The Farm

11 November 2026	Lyra-Lierse	3–0	Voorde-Appelterre	Lier
17:00 CET	Symons 30'; Berghmans 50'; Peffer 88'	Report		Stadium: Sportpark Lier

11 November 2026	Tienen	1–0	STVV Youth^{U23}	Tienen
18:00 CET	El Harrak 60'	Report		Stadium: Bergéstadion

=== Semi-finals ===
The draw will be made after completion of the Quarter-finals.

Number of teams per tier still in competition
Division 1 VV	Division 2 VV	Division 3 VV	Total
3 / 16	1 / 32	0 / 33	4 / 81

Semi-finals
Team 1	Score	Team 2
Jong Essevee^{U23}	3 Jan	Tienen
Lyra-Lierse	3 Jan	Dessel Sport

3 January 2027	Jong Essevee^{U23}	v	Tienen	Zulte
15:00 CET				Stadium: The Farm

3 January 2027	Lyra-Lierse	v	Dessel Sport	Lier
15:00 CET				Stadium: Sportpark Lier

=== Final ===
Venue and result to be added.

== See also ==
- Flemish Cup
- 2026–27 Belgian Cup
