= 2021–22 Belgian Division 2 =

Belgian Division 2
- Season: 2021–22
- Champions: Petegem (A), Hoogstraten (B) and RAAL La Louvière (C)
- Promoted: Ninove (A), Hoogstraten (B) and RAAL La Louvière (C)
- Relegated: Zwevezele, Menen, Ronse, Houtvenne, Wijgmaal, Couvin-Mariembourg, Givry, Durbuy

The 2021–22 Belgian Division 2 is the sixth season of the division in its current format, placed at the fourth-tier of football in Belgium. As the previous season was cancelled in January 2021 due to governmental measures against COVID-19 prohibiting amateur football, the division features nearly exactly teams.

As before the division consists of three separate leagues of 16 teams each. Leagues VFV A and VFV B consist of teams with a license from the Voetbalfederatie Vlaanderen (VFV, the Flemish/Dutch speaking wing of the Belgian FA), while the ACFF league contains teams with a license from the Association des Clubs Francophones de Football (ACFF, the French-speaking wing of the RBFA). The champions from each of the three leagues will be promoted to the 2022–23 Belgian National Division 1.

== Team changes ==
=== In ===
No new clubs entered as the previous season was cancelled.

=== Out ===
- Following legal proceedings, Virton was reinstated into the Belgian First Division B.

=== Mergers ===
- AFC Tubize merged with Stade Braine (which was playing at a lower level) to become Royale Union Tubize-Braine, known as Tubize-Braine.
- Spouwen-Mopertingen de facto merged with Bilzerse Waltwilder (which was playing at a lower level) to become S.V. Belisia, known as Belisia. In strict sense it is not a merger, as Bilzerse Waltwilder continues to exist, playing only in the youth competitions under the new name Bilzen Youth.
- Heur-Tongeren merged with SK Tongeren Jeugd to reinstate the former Tongeren and continue under that name.

== Belgian Division 2 VFV A ==
Locations of the 2021–22 Belgian Division 2 VV A teams

=== League table ===
Pos	Team	Pld	W	D	L	GF	GA	GD	Pts	Qualification or relegation
1	Petegem (Note: Champions Petegem chose not to apply for a license to play in the Belgian National Division 1 and was not eligible for promotion, they also opted not to participate in the Promotion play-offs VFV (which they could despite not being eligible for promotion).) (C)	30	20	7	3	73	30	+43	67	
2	Ninove (P)	30	18	6	6	69	30	+39	60	Promotion to the 2022–23 Belgian National Division 1
3	Olsa Brakel (Note: Both Brakel, Zelzate and Merelbeke qualified for the Promotion play-offs VFV based on their finishing position (after Petegem dropped out), despite not being eligible for promotion due to not applying for a license for the Belgian National Division 1 level for the coming season)	30	17	7	6	64	38	+26	58	Qualification for the Promotion play-offs VFV
4	Lokeren-Temse	30	17	6	7	45	28	+17	57	Qualification for the Promotion play-offs VFV
5	Zwevezele (Note: Zwevezele opted to drop down to the Belgian Provincial Leagues for the coming season.) (R)	30	16	8	6	62	37	+25	56	Relegation to the Belgian Provincial Leagues
6	Zelzate	30	15	4	11	50	39	+11	49	Qualification for the Promotion play-offs VFV
7	Merelbeke	30	13	6	11	43	43	0	45	Qualification for the Promotion play-offs VFV
8	Gullegem	30	11	8	11	43	46	−3	41	
9	Oudenaarde	30	12	4	14	39	49	−10	40	
10	Harelbeke	30	11	7	12	51	42	+9	40	
11	Gent-Zeehaven	30	12	3	15	42	46	−4	39	
12	Dikkelvenne	30	10	8	12	43	50	−7	38	
13	Westhoek	30	9	4	17	47	62	−15	31	
14	Wetteren (O)	30	6	5	19	34	63	−29	23	Qualification for the Relegation play-offs
15	Menen (Note: Menen will restart at the very bottom level of the Belgian football pyramid.) (R)	30	5	4	21	32	77	−45	19	Restarting at bottom level of pyramid
16	Ronse (Note: Ronse folds as a team, with its matricule being removed from the books. Officially, the club will merge into KVV Ardennen playing in the first provincial division, with the new club name still to be announced.) (R)	30	3	3	24	22	79	−57	12	Folded as a team

Source: vbal4
Rules for classification: 1) Points; 2) Matches won; 3) Goal difference; 4) Goals scored; 5) Away matches won; 6) Goal difference in away matches; 7) Away goals scored.
(C) Champions; (O) Play-off winners; (P) Promoted; (R) Relegated

== Belgian Division 2 VFV B ==
Locations of the 2021–22 Belgian Division 2 VV B teams

=== League table ===
Pos	Team	Pld	W	D	L	GF	GA	GD	Pts	Qualification or relegation
1	Hoogstraten (C, P)	30	22	4	4	72	22	+50	70	Promotion to the 2022–23 Belgian National Division 1
2	Aalst	30	17	6	7	61	35	+26	57	Qualification for the Promotion play-offs VFV
3	Lyra-Lierse	30	17	6	7	52	29	+23	57	Qualification for the Promotion play-offs VFV
4	Cappellen (Note: Cappellen qualified for the Promotion play-offs VFV based on its finishing position, despite not being eligible for promotion due to not applying for a license for the Belgian National Division 1 level for the coming season)	30	16	5	9	53	40	+13	53	Qualification for the Promotion play-offs VFV
5	Belisia	30	15	7	8	44	32	+12	52	Qualification for the Promotion play-offs VFV
6	Bocholt	30	15	6	9	47	38	+9	51	
7	City Pirates	30	13	4	13	44	56	−12	43	
8	Londerzeel	30	10	8	12	36	37	−1	38	
9	Diegem	30	9	8	13	36	45	−9	35	
10	Hasselt	30	10	4	16	38	50	−12	34	
11	Berchem	30	8	9	13	36	45	−9	33	
12	Tongeren	30	8	8	14	37	49	−12	32	
13	Hades	30	7	11	12	34	45	−11	32	
14	Pepingen-Halle	30	7	7	16	34	51	−17	28	Qualification for the Relegation play-offs
15	Houtvenne (R)	30	6	8	16	30	52	−22	26	Relegation to the 2022–23 Belgian Division 3
16	Wijgmaal (R)	30	6	7	17	30	58	−28	25	Relegation to the 2022–23 Belgian Division 3

Updated to match(es) played on completed. Source: vbal4
Rules for classification: 1) Points; 2) Matches won; 3) Goal difference; 4) Goals scored; 5) Away matches won; 6) Goal difference in away matches; 7) Away goals scored.
(C) Champions; (P) Promoted; (R) Relegated

== Belgian Division 2 ACFF ==
Locations of the 2021–22 Belgian Division 2 ACFF teams

=== League table ===
Pos	Team	Pld	W	D	L	GF	GA	GD	Pts	Qualification or relegation
1	La Louvière (C, P)	30	26	0	4	75	18	+57	78	Promotion to the 2022–23 Belgian National Division 1
2	Meux (Note: Meux and Warnant qualified for the Promotion play-offs ACFF based on its finishing position, despite not being eligible for promotion due to not applying for a license for the Belgian National Division 1 level for the coming season)	30	19	8	3	73	32	+41	65	Qualification for the Promotion play-offs ACFF
3	Warnant	30	17	10	3	61	24	+37	61	Qualification for the Promotion play-offs ACFF
4	Tubize-Braine	30	17	4	9	63	42	+21	52 (Note: Tubize-Braine were deducted 3 points for licence application inconsistencies in their application of two seasons ago)	Qualification for the Promotion play-offs ACFF
5	Rebecq (Note: Rebecq had applied for a license to be eligible for the Belgian National Division 1 for the coming season, but this was refused after the Promotion play-offs ACFF had already started)	30	14	7	9	53	40	+13	49	Qualification for the Promotion play-offs ACFF
6	Ganshoren	30	14	7	9	46	33	+13	49	
7	Solières	30	13	9	8	74	47	+27	48	
8	Hamoir	30	13	8	9	55	53	+2	47	
9	Acren-Lessines	30	13	3	14	61	61	0	42	
10	Jette	30	10	6	14	37	48	−11	36	
11	Waremme	30	9	4	17	48	58	−10	31	
12	Stockay	30	8	6	16	35	59	−24	30	
13	Verlaine	30	8	5	17	35	53	−18	29	
14	Couvin-Mariembourg (R)	30	6	6	18	31	59	−28	24	Relegation to the 2022–23 Belgian Division 3
15	Givry (R)	30	5	7	18	31	65	−34	22	Relegation to the 2022–23 Belgian Division 3
16	Durbuy (R)	30	2	2	26	16	102	−86	8	Relegation to the 2022–23 Belgian Division 3

Source: vbal4
Rules for classification: 1) Points; 2) Matches won; 3) Goal difference; 4) Goals scored; 5) Away matches won; 6) Goal difference in away matches; 7) Away goals scored.
(C) Champions; (P) Promoted; (R) Relegated

== Promotion play-offs ==
=== Promotion play-offs VFV ===
The teams finishing in second place in the Belgian Division 2 VFV A and Belgian Division 2 VFV B take part in a promotion playoff first round together with three period winners from these both divisions. These 8 teams from the VFV play the first round of a promotion-playoff, with two teams qualifying for the Promotion play-offs Final.

In division A, champions Petegem and runners-up Ninove each won one period title, with Olsa Brakel taking the third one. As a result, in theory Lokeren-Temse and Zwevezele would be joining the playoffs together with Ninove and Olsa Brakel. Petegem however had not applied for a license and could hence not be promoted, with Ninove taking its place. Furthermore, Petegem did not enter the Promotion play-offs (although they could have, despite not being eligible for promotion). Zwevezele folded as a team and also vacated their place, meaning in the end Olsa Brakel was joined by Lokeren-Temse, Zelzate and Merelbeke. Of these four teams, only Lokeren-Temse was eligible for promotion as the others had not applied for a license.

In division B, second place finishers Eendracht Aalst were joined by Lyra-Lierse (3rd) and Cappellen (4th) who had each won a period title. The final spot was completed by the highest finisher not already qualified, 5th place Belisia. Of these four teams, Cappellen was not eligible for promotion due to not applying for a license, meaning that overall, only four of the eight teams participating in the Promotion play-offs VFV would be allowed to take a place in the Promotion play-offs Final.

==== VFV Round 1 ====
8 May 2022

Olsa Brakel	3–1	Merelbeke
Shala; Otte (pen.); Capelleman	report	Van Laere

8 May 2022

Eendracht Aalst	1–1 (a.e.t.)	Cappellen
Geenens 38'	report	Van Zantvoort 70'
Penalties
Van Den Eynde (penalty scored); Fabris (penalty scored); Deconinck (penalty scored); Wantens (penalty scored); Panneel (penalty scored)	5–4	(penalty scored) Kil; (penalty scored) Van Zantvoort; (penalty scored) Ristovic; (penalty scored) Walen De Keyser; (penalty missed) Volant

8 May 2022

Belisia	2–2 (a.e.t.)	Lokeren-Temse
Martin-Suarez 14'; Vandecaetsbeek 108'	report	Vermeiren 32'; Boulaouali 99'
Penalties
Cascio (penalty scored); Wijnen (penalty scored); Lathouwers (penalty missed); Martin-Suarez (penalty scored); Cauwenberg (penalty scored)	4–3	(penalty scored) Ramazani; (penalty scored) De Neve; (penalty missed) De Witte; (penalty scored) Symons; (penalty missed) Boulaouali

8 May 2022

Zelzate	0–3	Lyra-Lierse Berlaar
	report	Adesanya 38'; Peffer 79', 90'

Olsa Brakel, Eendracht Aalst, Belisia and Lyra-Lierse Berlaar qualified for the VFV second round promotion play-offs.

==== VFV Round 2 ====
14 May 2022
19:30

Lyra-Lierse Berlaar	1–2	Olsa Brakel
Peffer 74' (pen.)	report	Cocquyt 6'; D'Hondt 36'

15 May 2022
15:00

Eendracht Aalst	2–0	Belisia
Mbaye 8'; Dekuyper 43'	report

Olsa Brakel and Eendracht Aalst qualified for the promotion play-offs Final. Olsa Brakel however was ineligible due to not applying for a licence to play at a higher level. Therefore a third round match was held between the losers of round 2.

==== VFV Round 3 ====
18 May 2022
20:00

Lyra-Lierse Berlaar	3–3 (a.e.t.)	Belisia
Schaessens 10'; Peffer 21', 110'	report	Stassen 51'; Ernens 81'; Wijnen 100' (pen.)
Penalties
Peffer (penalty scored); Adesanya (penalty scored); Van den Buijs (penalty scored); Vets (penalty scored); Kil (penalty scored); Weuts (penalty scored); De Wilde (penalty scored); Nys (penalty scored); Van Goylen (penalty missed); Lambreghts (penalty scored); Sterkens (penalty scored)	10–9	(penalty scored) Cascio; (penalty scored) Martin-Suarez; (penalty scored) Landuyt; (penalty scored) Wagemans; (penalty scored) Wijnen; (penalty scored) Ernens; (penalty scored) La Mantia; (penalty scored) Timmermans; (penalty missed) Vandecaetsbeek; (penalty scored) Stassen; (penalty missed) T. Haenen

Lyra-Lierse Berlaar qualified for the promotion play-offs Final, together with Round 2 winner Eendracht Aalst.

=== Promotion play-offs ACFF ===
Meux, as team finishing in second place in the Belgian Division 2 ACFF qualified for the Promotion play-offs ACFF, as well as Tubize-Braine (4th overall) for winning the third period. The two other periods were won by champions RAAL La Louvière and hence 3rd and 5th placed teams Warnant and Rebecq were invited as well. Prior to the start of these play-offs however, both Meux and Warnant were already ineligible for promotion as they had not applied for a license for the level above, while Rebecq had been refused a license but had appealed this decision. In case the appeal was not successful, Tubize-Braine would automatically qualify for the Promotion play-offs Final from ACFF side, however the appeal decision was only announced on 20 May while the ACFF Round 1 matches were already scheduled for 8 May.

==== ACFF Round 1 ====
8 May 2022

Warnant	3–2	Meux
Fransolet; Biscotti; Mavuba	report	Smal; Bajraktari

8 May 2022

Rebecq	1–1 (a.e.t.)	Tubize-Braine
Bova	report	Migliore
Penalties
	4–3

Warnant and Rebecq qualified for ACFF Round 2.

==== ACFF Round 2 ====
15 May 2022

Rebecq	2–5 (a.e.t.)	Warnant
Timmermans 15' (o.g.); Depotbecker 57'	report	Fransolet 50' (pen.); Scevenels 61'; Biatour 106', 115'; Grymonpré 120' (o.g.)

With Warnant ineligible for promotion, the Round 2 match was effectively useless and Rebecq would choose a lineup of youngsters, knowing they had already won the right to take part in the Promotion play-offs Final. On 20 May 2022 however, the final verdict of the license appeal was that Rebecq would not be awarded a license for the Belgian National Division 1, making them also ineligible for promotion. With Tubize-Braine now the only team from ACFF with a license, despite losing in an earlier round, they took over the place of Rebecq.

=== Promotion play-offs Final ===
The two winners of the Promotion play-offs on the VFV side (Eendracht Aalst and Lyra-Lierse Berlaar) and Tubize-Braine, the only team with a valid license taking part in the ACFF Promotion play-offs played a final tournament together with the team that finished in 14th place in the 2021–22 Belgian National Division 1 (Mandel United). The winner of this play-off promotes to (or remains in) the 2022–23 Belgian National Division 1. As Mandel United is a team from the VFV side, there will be an extra VFV team relegating from the 2022–23 Belgian Division 2 in case the team from the ACFF side (Tubize-Braine) gets promoted. The losing team of the Relegation play-offs, Pepingen-Halle, hence had to hope Tubize-Braine would not win the Promotion play-offs Final.

==== Final Round 1 ====
22 May 2022
15:00

Mandel United	2–1	Eendracht Aalst
Kumbi 26'; Jalloh 88'		Mbaye 31'

26 May 2022
19:30

Eendracht Aalst	0–0	Mandel United
	report

Mandel United won 2–1 on aggregate and moves on to Final Round 2, Eendracht Aalst remains in the Belgian Division 2.

22 May 2022
15:00

Tubize-Braine	1–1	Lyra-Lierse Berlaar
El Omari 21' (pen.)		Peffer 75'

26 May 2022
20:00

Lyra-Lierse Berlaar	0–1 (a.e.t.)	Tubize-Braine
	report	Garlito 92'

Tubize-Braine won 2–1 on aggregate and moves on to Final Round 2, Lyra-Lierse Berlaar remains in the Belgian Division 2.

==== Final Round 2 ====
29 May 2022
15:00

Mandel United	6–2	Tubize-Braine
Tsagué 8', 52'; Ferber 11', 74'; Verhaest 45'; Kimpala 50'	report	Michel 22'; Mukendi 83'

2 June 2022
19:30

Tubize-Braine	1–2	Mandel United
Debolé 19'	report	Ferber 25'; Jalloh 52'

Referee: Ibrahim Afifi

Mandel United won 8–2 on aggregate and thereby secures its stay in the 2022–23 Belgian National Division 1, while Tubize-Braine is denied promotion and remains in the Belgian Division 2.

== Relegation play-offs ==
The number of teams relegating from the Belgian Division 2 in each wing (VFV and ACFF) depends on the number of teams of each wing relegating from the Belgian National Division 1.

In case Mandel United, taking part in the Promotion play-offs Final and also from VFV side is relegated and replaced by a team from ACFF side, then an extra VFV team will be relegated from the 2021–22 Belgian Division 2. On ACFF side on the other hand, no extra relegations would be necessary and only the three bottom teams the ACFF division would be relegated.

=== Relegation play-offs VFV ===
The teams finishing 14th in divisions A and B played each other in a single match to avoid relegation, with the winning team spared of relegation while the losing team relegating in case a team from the ACFF wing would win the Promotion play-offs Final, to be completed later that month.

8 May 2022
15:00

Wetteren	4–1	Pepingen-Halle
Willemyns 20', 48'; De Caigny 27'; Dib 90'	Report	Ngadrira 68' (pen.)

Wetteren was spared of relegation, Pepingen-Halle had to await the result of the Promotion play-offs Final.

=== Relegation play-offs ACFF ===
As there is only one division no playoff was organised, furthermore no extra relegations were necessary hence only the bottom three teams from the ACFF division were relegated.

== Number of teams by provinces ==
Number of teams	Province or region	Team(s) in VFV A	Team(s) in VFV B	Team(s) in ACFF
12	East Flanders	Brakel, Dikkelvenne, RC Gent, Lokeren-Temse, Merelbeke, Ninove, Oudenaarde, Petegem, Ronse, Wetteren and Zelzate	Aalst	–
6	Antwerp	none	Berchem, Cappellen, City Pirates, Hoogstraten, Houtvenne and Lyra-Lierse	–
6	Liège	–	–	Hamoir, Solières, Stockay, Verlaine, Waremme and Warnant
5	Limburg	none	Belisia, Bocholt, Hades, Hasselt, Tongeren	–
5	West Flanders	Gullegem, Harelbeke, Menen, Westhoek and Zwevezele	none	–
4	Flemish Brabant	none	Diegem, Londerzeel, Pepingen-Halle and Wijgmaal	–
2	Brussels	none	none	Ganshoren and Jette
2	Hainaut	–	–	Acren Lessines and RAAL La Louvière
2	Luxembourg	–	–	Durbuy and Givry
2	Namur	–	–	Couvin-Mariembourg and Meux
2	Walloon Brabant	–	–	Rebecq and Tubize-Braine
