= List of Belgian football transfers summer 2023 =

This is a list of Belgian football transfers for the 2023 summer transfer window. Only transfers involving a team from the professional divisions are listed, including the 16 teams in the Belgian First Division A and the 16 teams playing in the Belgian First Division B.

The summer transfer window opens on 1 July 2023 and ends 6th of September 2023.

Note that several transfers were announced prior to the opening date. Furthermore, players without a club may join one at any time, either during or in between transfer windows. After the transfer window closes a few completed transfers might still be announced a few days later.

== Transfers ==
Date	Name	Moving from	Moving to	Fee
1 July 2023	(Sweden) Jacob Ondrejka	(Sweden) IF Elfsborg	Royal Antwerp F.C.	Transfer
1 July 2023	Maël Debondt	RSC Anderlecht	KAA Gent	Free
1 July 2023	Julian Baiocchi	KRC Genk	Club Brugge KV	Free
1 July 2023	Gilles Van Steenland	KAA Gent	Club Brugge KV	Free
1 July 2023	(Palestine) Oday Dabbagh	(Portugal) F.C. Arouca	RSC Charleroi	Free
1 July 2023	(Poland) Michał Skóraś	(Poland) Lech Poznań	Club Brugge KV	Transfer
1 July 2023	Remko De Backer	FCV Dender EH	SC Dikkelvenne	Free
1 July 2023	Cisse Verstrynge	KMSK Deinze	SC Dikkelvenne	Free
1 July 2023	Cel Teunen	Lierse Kempenzonen	K. Lyra-Lierse Berlaar	Free
1 July 2023	(Ecuador) Willian Pacho	R Antwerp FC	(Germany) Eintracht Frankfurt	Transfer
1 July 2023	Mike Smet	FCV Dender EH	K.S.K. Heist	Free
1 July 2023	(Netherlands) Sven Braken	(Netherlands) VVV-Venlo	KMSK Deinze	Free
1 July 2023	(Netherlands) Thomas van Bommel	(Netherlands) MVV Maastricht	K. Patro Eisden Maasmechelen	Free
1 July 2023	Wout Meese	RSC Anderlecht	Royal Knokke F.C.	Free
1 July 2023	(Ghana) Eric Ocansey	KV Kortrijk	Lierse Kempenzonen	Free
1 July 2023	(Jordan) Musa Al-Taamari	OH Leuven	(France) Montpellier HSC	Free
1 July 2023	(Australia) Jordan Bos	(Australia) Melbourne City FC	KVC Westerlo	Transfer
1 July 2023	Simion Michez	RSC Anderlecht	K Beerschot VA	Free
1 July 2023	David Davtyan	KMSK Deinze	KVV Zelzate	Free
1 July 2023	Glenn Claes	RWDM47	Lierse Kempenzonen	Free
1 July 2023	Joris Kayembe	RSC Charleroi	KRC Genk	Transfer
1 July 2023	(Slovenia) Žan Rogelj	(Austria) WSG Tirol	RSC Charleroi	Transfer
1 July 2023	Bas Wouters	KVC Westerlo	Lierse Kempenzonen	Free
1 July 2023	Obbi Oulare	(England) Barnsley F.C.	Lierse Kempenzonen	Transfer
1 July 2023	(Germany) Robert Bauer	Sint-Truidense V.V.	(Saudi Arabia) Al-Tai FC	Free
1 July 2023	(France) Jérémy Perbet	RFC Liège	Sint-Eloois-Winkel Sport	Free
1 July 2023	Arne Cassaert	Cercle Brugge	K.S.C. Lokeren-Temse	Free
1 July 2023	Alessio Cascio	URSL Visé	RFC Liège	Free
1 July 2023	Loïc Besson	RFC Liège	Union Namur	Free
1 July 2023	(Australia) Keegan Jelacic	(Australia) Perth Glory FC	KAA Gent	Transfer
1 July 2023	Arthur Piedfort	(Netherlands) PSV Eindhoven	KVC Westerlo	Free
1 July 2023	(Cape Verde) Alessio da Cruz	KV Mechelen	(Italy) Feralpisalò	Transfer
1 July 2023	Laurent Lemoine	Lommel S.K.	KMSK Deinze	Free
1 July 2023	Rayan Buifrahi	KV Oostende	(Netherlands) MVV Maastricht	Transfer
1 July 2023	(Japan) Ryotaro Ito	(Japan) Albirex Niigata	Sint-Truidense V.V.	Transfer
1 July 2023	Mohamed El Boukammiri	Royale Union Saint-Gilloise	Club Brugge KV	Free
1 July 2023	(Portugal) Jorge Teixeira	Sint-Truidense V.V.	(Portugal) U.D. Vilafranquense	Free
1 July 2023	Nils De Wilde	RSC Anderlecht	Cercle Brugge	Free
1 July 2023	(Angola) Igor Vetokele	K.V.C. Westerlo	Lommel S.K.	Free
1 July 2023	Mathis Servais	Club Brugge KV	S.K. Beveren	Free
1 July 2023	Senne Lammens	Club Brugge KV	Royal Antwerp F.C.	Free
1 July 2023	Elton Kabangu	(Netherlands) Willem II	Royale Union Saint-Gilloise	Free
1 July 2023	(Japan) Tsuyoshi Watanabe	KV Kortrijk	KAA Gent	Transfer
1 July 2023	(Northern Ireland) Isaac Price	(England) Everton	Standard Liège	Free
1 July 2023	Bruno Godeau	KAA Gent	Sint-Truidense V.V.	Free
1 July 2023	(Togo) Frederic Ananou	(Germany) FC Hansa Rostock	Sint-Truidense V.V.	Free
1 July 2023	(Brazil) Igor Thiago	(Bulgaria) PFC Ludogorets Razgrad	Club Brugge KV	Transfer
1 July 2023	(Australia) Aiden O'Neill	(Australia) Melbourne City FC	Standard Liège	Free
1 July 2023	Pieter Gerkens	Royal Antwerp F.C.	KAA Gent	Free
1 July 2023	Fedde Leysen	(Netherlands) PSV Eindhoven	Royale Union Saint-Gilloise	Free
1 July 2023	(Spain) Víctor Barberà	(Spain) FC Barcelona	Club Brugge KV	Free
1 July 2023	Maxime Delanghe	Lierse Kempenzonen	Cercle Brugge	Free
1 July 2023	(Togo) Karim Dermane	(Netherlands) Feyenoord	Lommel S.K.	Transfer
1 July 2023	Kino Delorge	RE Virton	(Luxembourg) F91 Dudelange	Free
1 July 2023	Lucas Walbrecq	Lierse Kempenzonen	R. Olympic Charleroi	Free
1 July 2023	Kéres Masangu	RE Virton	FCV Dender EH	Free
1 July 2023	Reno Wilmots	URSL Visé	RFC Liège	Free
1 July 2023	(Bosnia and Herzegovina) Elvis Mehanović	K. Patro Eisden	K.V.V. Thes Sport	Free
1 July 2023	(Germany) Lion Lauberbach	(Germany) Eintracht Braunschweig	KV Mechelen	Free
1 July 2023	(Senegal) Franck Kanouté	Cercle Brugge	(Serbia) FK Partizan	Free
1 July 2023	(Japan) Daichi Hayashi	Sint-Truidense V.V.	(Germany) 1. FC Nürnberg	Loan
1 July 2023	(Netherlands) Ezechiel Banzuzi	(Netherlands) NAC Breda	OH Leuven	Transfer
1 July 2023	Antoine Bernier	R.F.C. Seraing (1922)	R. Charleroi S.C.	Free
1 July 2023	(Cyprus) Fanos Katelaris	KV Oostende	(Cyprus) AEK Larnaca FC	Transfer
1 July 2023	Iebe Swers	KV Mechelen	K. Patro Eisden	Loan
1 July 2023	Louka Vanderbruggen	Club Brugge KV	(Netherlands) De Graafschap	Free
1 July 2023	(Germany) Henok Teklab	(Germany) SC Preußen Münster	Royale Union Saint-Gilloise	Free
1 July 2023	Kristof D'Haene	KV Kortrijk	Roeselare-Daisel	Free
1 July 2023	Irsan Muric	Club Brugge KV	KVC Westerlo	Free
1 July 2023	(Portugal) João Gamboa	OH Leuven	(Poland) Pogoń Szczecin	Transfer
1 July 2023	Ferre Slegers	Sint-Truidense V.V.	(Netherlands) MVV Maastricht	Free
1 July 2023	Charles Vanhoutte	Cercle Brugge	Royale Union Saint-Gilloise	Transfer
1 July 2023	(Japan) Koji Miyoshi	Royal Antwerp F.C.	(England) Birmingham City F.C.	Free
1 July 2023	(France) Kévin Vandendriessche	KV Kortrijk	Francs Borains	Free
1 July 2023	(Germany) Gabriel Kyeremateng	(Switzerland) FC Thun	S.K. Beveren	Free
1 July 2023	Dario Cutillas-Carpe	KRC Genk	OH Leuven	Free
1 July 2023	(Japan) Ryoya Ogawa	(Japan) FC Tokyo	Sint-Truidense V.V.	Loan
1 July 2023	Bruny Nsimba	S.K. Beveren	FCV Dender EH	Free
1 July 2023	(Austria) Daniel Maderner	S.K. Beveren	(Austria) Grazer AK	Free
1 July 2023	(The Gambia) Alieu Fadera	SV Zulte Waregem	KRC Genk	Transfer
1 July 2023	(Germany) Kevin Möhwald	(Germany) 1. FC Union Berlin	KAS Eupen	Transfer
1 July 2023	Dries Wouters	(Germany) FC Schalke 04	Lommel S.K.	Transfer
1 July 2023	(England) Romaine Mundle	(England) Tottenham Hotspur	Standard Liège	Free
1 July 2023	(Norway) Mathias Rasmussen	(Norway) SK Brann	Royale Union Saint-Gilloise	Transfer
1 July 2023	Pierre Dwomoh	Royal Antwerp F.C.	RWDM47	Loan
1 July 2023	(France) Leroy Abanda	R.F.C. Seraing (1922)	(Greece) OFI	Transfer
1 July 2023	Noë Dussenne	Standard Liège	(Switzerland) FC Lausanne-Sport	Free
1 July 2023	Guillaume Hubert	KV Oostende	RWDM47	Free
1 July 2023	Thomas Mukendi	Standard Liège	OH Leuven	Free
1 July 2023	(France) Jordan Semedo	(France) AS Monaco FC	Cercle Brugge	Loan
1 July 2023	Joseph Amuzu	KV Mechelen	(Netherlands) Helmond Sport	Loan
1 July 2023	Noé Rottiers	KV Mechelen	(Netherlands) Helmond Sport	Loan
1 July 2023	(Algeria) Rafik Belghali	Lommel S.K.	KV Mechelen	Transfer
1 July 2023	Alexandro Calut	Standard Liège	OH Leuven	Loan
1 July 2023	Welat Cargo	Free Agent	K Beerschot VA	Free
1 July 2023	(Japan) Rihito Yamamoto	(Japan) Gamba Osaka	Sint-Truidense V.V.	Loan
1 July 2023	(Ghana) Joselpho Barnes	(Latvia) Riga FC	Sint-Truidense V.V.	Transfer
1 July 2023	(France) George Ilenikhena	(France) Amiens SC	Royal Antwerp F.C.	Transfer
1 July 2023	Adrien Giunta	Royal FC Mandel United	Standard Liège	Free
1 July 2023	(Rwanda) Hakim Sahabo	(France) Lille OSC	Standard Liège	Free
1 July 2023	(Mali) Mamadou Traoré	Free Agent	Royale Union Saint-Gilloise	Free
1 July 2023	(Germany) Nick Bätzner	KV Oostende	(Germany) SV Wehen Wiesbaden	Transfer
1 July 2023	Brent Laes	Lierse Kempenzonen	KV Oostende	Free
1 July 2023	Mike Vanhamel	K Beerschot VA	RAAL La Louvière	Free
1 July 2023	Jorn Vancamp	OH Leuven	RAAL La Louvière	Free
1 July 2023	Mathias Francotte	RAAL La Louvière	Francs Borains	Free
1 July 2023	Thomas Renier	R.F.C. Seraing (1922)	RCS Verlaine	Free
1 July 2023	Ilias Sebaoui	K Beerschot VA	(Netherlands) Feyenoord	Transfer
1 July 2023	Anis Bouchrafat	K.M.S.K. Deinze	(Netherlands) Willem II	Free
1 July 2023	Maties-Tuntuna Germonprez	K. Patro Eisden	(Netherlands) RKSV Groene Ster	Free
1 July 2023	Lucas Schoofs	(Netherlands) Heracles Almelo	Lommel S.K.	Free
2 July 2023	(United States) Agustin Anello	Lommel S.K.	(Netherlands) Sparta Rotterdam	Transfer
3 July 2023	(Brazil) Abner Felipe	(Portugal) S.C. Farense	RWDM47	Free
3 July 2023	(Netherlands) Bart Verbruggen	RSC Anderlecht	(England) Brighton & Hove Albion	Transfer
3 July 2023	(Israel) Raz Shlomo	(Israel) Maccabi Netanya F.C.	OH Leuven	Transfer
3 July 2023	(Norway) Hugo Vetlesen	(Norway) FK Bodø/Glimt	Club Brugge KV	Transfer
3 July 2023	Milan Robberechts	KV Mechelen	(Netherlands) Fortuna Sittard	Transfer
3 July 2023	(France) Thierno Barry	S.K. Beveren	(Switzerland) FC Basel	Transfer
4 July 2023	(Iceland) Stefán Ingi Sigurðarson	(Iceland) Breiðablik	K. Patro Eisden	Transfer
4 July 2023	(Senegal) Issa Soumaré	K Beerschot VA	(France) Le Havre AC	Transfer
4 July 2023	Cederick Van Daele	KAA Gent	KV Oostende	Free
4 July 2023	Maxim Deman	KV Kortrijk	S.K. Beveren	Free
4 July 2023	(France) Nolan Gillot	(France) US Orléans	Royal Antwerp F.C.	Free
4 July 2023	Tuur Rommens	KRC Genk	KVC Westerlo	Transfer
4 July 2023	Matisse Didden	KRC Genk	(Netherlands) Roda JC Kerkrade	Transfer
4 July 2023	(Kazakhstan) Yan Vorogovsky	RWDM47	(Kazakhstan) FC Astana	Transfer
4 July 2023	(Guinea) Ibrahima Sory Sankhon	RWDM47	FCV Dender EH	Free
4 July 2023	Joedrick Pupe	Lierse Kempenzonen	FCV Dender EH	Free
4 July 2023	Jan Van den Bergh	K Beerschot VA	(Netherlands) NAC Breda	Transfer
5 July 2023	Enzo Keutgen	Royal Antwerp F.C.	(Italy) Juventus FC	Transfer
5 July 2023	(Cameroon) Jerome Ngom Mbekeli	S.K. Beveren	(Moldavia) FC Sheriff Tiraspol	Transfer
6 July 2023	Glodi Mbuyi-Mbayo	K.V.V. Thes Sport	Royal Antwerp F.C.	Free
6 July 2023	Thibo Baeten	K Beerschot VA	(Netherlands) Go Ahead Eagles	Transfer
6 July 2023	(Portugal) Fábio Baptista	Sint-Truidense V.V.	(Portugal) Leixões S.C.	Transfer
6 July 2023	(Ghana) Christopher Bonsu Baah	(Norway) Sarpsborg 08 FF	KRC Genk	Transfer
6 July 2023	Brent Gabriël	S.K. Beveren	KV Oostende	Transfer
6 July 2023	(Brazil) Lucas Ribeiro Costa	S.K. Beveren	(South Africa) Mamelodi Sundowns	Transfer
6 July 2023	Ilias Takidine	RSC Anderlecht	(Netherlands) RKC Waalwijk	Transfer
6 July 2023	(Angola) Clinton Mata	Club Brugge KV	(France) Olympique Lyon	Transfer
6 July 2023	(France) Simon Elisor	R.F.C. Seraing (1922)	(France) FC Metz	Transfer
6 July 2023	Danny Fofana	FCV Dender EH	Union Namur	Loan
7 July 2023	Noah Adedeji-Sternberg	(Germany) Borussia Mönchengladbach	KRC Genk	Transfer
7 July 2023	Daam Foulon	(Italy) Benevento Calcio	KV Mechelen	Transfer
7 July 2023	(Turkey) Tiago Çukur	(Turkey) Fenerbahçe S.K.	S.K. Beveren	Loan
7 July 2023	Tom Reyners	S.K. Beveren	K Beerschot VA	Transfer
7 July 2023	(Malta) Teddy Teuma	Royale Union Saint-Gilloise	(France) Stade de Reims	Transfer
7 July 2023	(Japan) Hayao Kawabe	(England) Wolverhampton	Standard Liège	Transfer
7 July 2023	(Guinea) Fodé Guirassy	(France) Stade Briochin	Francs Borains	Transfer
8 July 2023	Dylan Dassy	KV Mechelen	S.K. Beveren	Transfer
8 July 2023	Zinho Vanheusden	(Italy) Inter Milan	Standard Liège	Loan
8 July 2023	(Burkina Faso) Abdoul Tapsoba	Standard Liège	(France) Amiens SC	Loan
8 July 2023	(Italy) Francesco Di Bartolo	(Italy) Udinese	Lommel SK	Transfer
8 July 2023	(Netherlands) Noa Lang	Club Brugge KV	(Netherlands) PSV Eindhoven	Transfer
8 July 2023	Maarten Swerts	KRC Genk	(Netherlands) FC Eindhoven	Free
8 July 2023	(Denmark) Kasper Dolberg	(France) OGC Nice	RSC Anderlecht	Transfer
8 July 2023	Louis Patris	OH Leuven	RSC Anderlecht	Transfer
8 July 2023	(Scotland) Tsoanelo Letsosa	(Scotland) Celtic F.C.	Lommel SK	Free
9 July 2023	(Germany) Toni Leistner	Sint-Truidense V.V.	(Germany) Hertha BSC	Free
9 July 2023	(Netherlands) Luc Marijnissen	(Netherlands) NAC Breda	Lierse Kempenzonen	Free
10 July 2023	(France) Thomas Robinet	KV Oostende	(Netherlands) Almere City FC	Transfer
10 July 2023	(Iran) Ali Gholizadeh	RSC Charleroi	(Poland) Lech Poznań	Transfer
10 July 2023	(Japan) Tatsuhiro Sakamoto	KV Oostende	(England) Coventry City	Transfer
11 July 2023	Jorn Brondeel	SK Beveren	(Netherlands) FC Eindhoven	Free
12 July 2023	Lukas Mondele	Club Brugge KV	(Italy) Modena FC	Free
12 July 2023	Luca Foubert	KV Kortrijk	Lierse Kempenzonen	Transfer
12 July 2023	Lynnt Audoor	Club Brugge KV	KV Kortrijk	Loan
12 July 2023	(Poland) Bartosz Białek	(Germany) VfL Wolfsburg	KAS Eupen	Loan
12 July 2023	(Morocco) Ismaël Kandouss	Royale Union Saint-Gilloise	KAA Gent	Transfer
12 July 2023	Vadis Odjidja-Ofoe	KAA Gent	(Croatia) Hajduk Split	Free
12 July 2023	(Argentina) Kevin Mac Allister	(Argentina) Argentinos Juniors	Royale Union Saint-Gilloise	Transfer
12 July 2023	(Ecuador) Alan Minda	(Ecuador) Independiente del Valle	Cercle Brugge	Transfer
12 July 2023	(Bosnia and Herzegovina) Dino Hotić	Cercle Brugge	(Poland) Lech Poznań	Free
12 July 2023	(Bosnia and Herzegovina) Gojko Cimirot	Standard Liège	(Saudi Arabia) Al-Fayha FC	Free
12 July 2023	(Netherlands) Ennio van der Gouw	(Netherlands) VVV-Venlo	SV Zulte Waregem	Transfer
12 July 2023	(France) Lilian Raillot	(France) FC Metz	RFC Seraing	Loan
12 July 2023	(France) Oussmane Kebe	(France) FC Metz	RFC Seraing	Loan
12 July 2023	(France) Édouard Soumah-Abbad	(France) FC Metz	RFC Seraing	Loan
12 July 2023	(Spain) Alvaro Santos	(Spain) Celta de Vigo	Lommel SK	Free
13 July 2023	(Guinea) Bafodé Dansoko	KMSK Deinze	K. Patro Eisden Maasmechelen	Free
13 July 2023	(France) Félix Nzouango	(Italy) Juventus FC	K Beerschot VA	Free
13 July 2023	(Guinea) Mory Konaté	Sint-Truidense V.V.	KV Mechelen	Free
13 July 2023	Jarno Lion	KV Mechelen	(Netherlands) HSV Hoek	Free
14 July 2023	Clément Deschryver	Francs Borains	R.A.E.C. Mons	Free
15 July 2023	(Ivory Coast) Abakar Sylla	Club Brugge KV	(France) RC Strasbourg	Transfer
16 July 2023	(France) Goduine Koyalipou	(Switzerland) FC Lausanne-Sport	S.K. Beveren	Transfer
16 July 2023	(Republic of Ireland) Matthew Healy	(Republic of Ireland) Cork City F.C.	Francs Borains	Transfer
17 July 2023	(Mexico) Hugo Weckmann	Free Agent	Lommel S.K.	Free
17 July 2023	Jonathan De Bie	RWDM47	K.S.C. Lokeren-Temse	Loan
18 July 2023	Hendrik van Crombrugge	RSC Anderlecht	KRC Genk	Transfer
18 July 2023	Jay-Dee Geusens	KRC Genk	S.K. Beveren	Transfer
18 July 2023	(France) Maxime Dupé	(France) Toulouse FC	RSC Anderlecht	Free
18 July 2023	Siebe Van der Heyden	Royale Union Saint-Gilloise	(Spain) RCD Mallorca	Transfer
18 July 2023	(Spain) David Álvarez	KAS Eupen	(Spain) Deportivo de La Coruña	Loan
18 July 2023	Sammy Bossut	SV Zulte Waregem	K.R.C. Harelbeke	Free
18 July 2023	(Bosnia and Herzegovina) Smail Prevljak	KAS Eupen	(Germany) Hertha BSC	Free
19 July 2023	(Japan) Kento Misao	(Portugal) C.D. Santa Clara	OH Leuven	Transfer
19 July 2023	Milan Troonbeeckx	Lommel S.K.	FC Wezel Sport	Loan
19 July 2023	(France) Gaëtan Arib	Francs Borains	RE Virton	Free
19 July 2023	(Japan) Shuto Abe	(Japan) FC Tokyo	RWDM47	Transfer
19 July 2023	Othman El Ouamari	RWDM47	Tubize-Braine	Free
20 July 2023	(Morocco) Oussama El Azzouzi	Royale Union Saint-Gilloise	(Italy) Bologna FC	Transfer
20 July 2023	(Morocco) Amine Et-Taïbi	KRC Genk	Club Brugge KV	Transfer
21 July 2023	(Ivory Coast) Konan N'Dri	KAS Eupen	OH Leuven	Transfer
21 July 2023	Jonas Vinck	RE Virton	KV Oostende	Transfer
21 July 2023	Casper de Norre	OH Leuven	(England) Millwall F.C.	Transfer
21 July 2023	(Iceland) Nökkvi Þeyr Þórisson	K Beerschot VA	(United States) St. Louis City SC	Transfer
21 July 2023	(Morocco) Ahmed Khatir	(Morocco) Mohammed VI Football Academy	S.K. Beveren	Transfer
21 July 2023	(Poland) Patryk Walicki	KAA Gent	Francs Borains	Loan
22 July 2023	(Kenya) Joseph Okumu	KAA Gent	(France) Stade de Reims	Transfer
22 July 2023	(Nigeria) Victor Boniface	Royale Union Saint-Gilloise	(Germany) Bayer Leverkusen	Transfer
22 July 2023	(Croatia) Matija Frigan	(Croatia) HNK Rijeka	KVC Westerlo	Transfer
23 July 2023	Samuel Asoma	Royale Union Saint-Gilloise	(Sweden) Dalkurd FF	Transfer
23 July 2023	Brent Stevens	KRC Genk	(Netherlands) MVV Maastricht	Free
24 July 2023	(Ukraine) Bohdan Mykhaylichenko	RSC Anderlecht	(Croatia) Dinamo Zagreb	Transfer
24 July 2023	Livio Milts	K. Patro Eisden	Dessel Sport	Free
24 July 2023	Sam Valcke	K. Patro Eisden	S.V. Belisia Bilzen	Loan
24 July 2023	(Comoros) Faïz Selemani	KV Kortrijk	(Saudi Arabia) Al-Hazem F.C.	Transfer
24 July 2023	Martijn Beernaert	SV Zulte Waregem	KSC Dikkelvenne	Free
25 July 2023	(France) Xavier Mercier	(Hungary) Ferencvárosi TC	RWDM47	Transfer
25 July 2023	(France) Florian Miguel	(Spain) SD Huesca	OH Leuven	Free
25 July 2023	(Netherlands) Justin Lonwijk	(Ukraine) FC Dynamo Kyiv	RSC Anderlecht	Loan
25 July 2023	(Mauritania) Souleymane Anne	RE Virton	KMSK Deinze	Free
26 July 2023	(Cameroon) Samuel Gouet	KV Mechelen	(Switzerland) Yverdon Sport FC	Transfer
26 July 2023	(Scotland) Adedire Mebude	(England) Manchester City	KVC Westerlo	Transfer
26 July 2023	(Argentina) Luis Vázquez	(Argentina) Boca Juniors	RSC Anderlecht	Transfer
26 July 2023	(France) Julien Maggiotti	RSC Charleroi	(France) SC Bastia	Transfer
26 July 2023	(Scotland) Jack Hendry	Club Brugge KV	(Saudi Arabia) Al-Ettifaq FC	Transfer
26 July 2023	(Bosnia and Herzegovina) Igor Savić	(Russia) FC Torpedo Moscow	SV Zulte Waregem	Free
26 July 2023	Aristote Nkaka	RSC Anderlecht	Lierse Kempenzonen	Free
26 July 2023	(Iran) Amirhossein Hosseinzadeh	RSC Charleroi	(Iran) Tractor FC	Transfer
26 July 2023	Lorenzo De Geyndt	FCV Dender EH	KVV Zelzate	Free
27 July 2023	(Japan) Joel Chima Fujita	(Japan) Yokohama F. Marinos	Sint-Truidense V.V.	Transfer
27 July 2023	(Haiti) Tristan Demetrius	(Costa Rica) Deportivo Saprissa	KAA Gent	Transfer
27 July 2023	(Serbia) Luka Lijeskić	(Serbia) FK Brodarac	KAA Gent	Transfer
27 July 2023	(Burkina Faso) Abdoul Ayinde	(Burkina Faso) Rahimo FC	KAA Gent	Transfer
27 July 2023	(Estonia) Ramol Sillamaa	(Estonia) JK Tallinna Kalev	KAA Gent	Transfer
27 July 2023	(England) Tudor Mendel-Idowu	(England) Chelsea F.C.	RSC Anderlecht	Free
27 July 2023	(Luxembourg) Alessio Curci	(Germany) 1. FSV Mainz 05	Francs Borains	Free
27 July 2023	Jordy Gillekens	Lierse Kempenzonen	Francs Borains	Free
27 July 2023	Noah Sadiki	RSC Anderlecht	Royale Union Saint-Gilloise	Transfer
28 July 2023	(Iceland) Victor Pálsson	(United States) D.C. United	KAS Eupen	Free
28 July 2023	(Republic of Ireland) Liam Bossin	(Netherlands) FC Dordrecht	KV Oostende	Transfer
28 July 2023	Derrick Tshimanga	S.K. Beveren	K Beerschot VA	Free
28 July 2023	(Mali) Sibiry Keita	KAS Eupen	(Bulgaria) Slavia Sofia	Transfer
28 July 2023	(Colombia) Jhon Banguera	(Colombia) Envigado F.C.	Lommel S.K.	Transfer
28 July 2023	(Bulgaria) Filip Krastev	Lommel S.K.	(United States) Los Angeles FC	Loan
28 July 2023	(Republic of the Congo) Ravy Tsouka	SV Zulte Waregem	(Cyprus) AEL Limassol	Free
28 July 2023	Lucas Stassin	RSC Anderlecht	KVC Westerlo	Transfer
28 July 2023	Pieter Caubergh	KVC Westerlo	K.S.K. Tongeren	Free
29 July 2023	(Albania) Lindon Ajeti	Standard Liège	(Italy) SSD Casarano Calcio	Free
30 July 2023	(Nigeria) Chidera Ejuke	(Russia) CSKA Moscow	Royal Antwerp F.C.	Loan
30 July 2023	(France) Florent Da Silva	(France) Olympique Lyonnais	RWDM47	Loan
30 July 2023	(Senegal) Makhtar Gueye	KV Oostende	RWDM47	Transfer
30 July 2023	Alex Alvarez Fernandez	KAA Gent	K.R.C. Gent	Free
31 July 2023	(Romania) Raul Opruț	(Romania) FC Hermannstadt	KV Kortrijk	Transfer
31 July 2023	(Ivory Coast) Abdoulaye Traoré	(Bulgaria) Botev Plovdiv	SV Zulte Waregem	Transfer
31 July 2023	(France) Bryan Goncalves	(France) Stade Lavallois	S.K. Beveren	Free
31 July 2023	(France) Ouparine Djoco	(France) Clermont Foot	Francs Borains	Loan
1 August 2023	Nordin Jackers	OH Leuven	Club Brugge KV	Loan
1 August 2023	(Ivory Coast) Charly Keita	(France) Clermont Foot	K Beerschot VA	Transfer
1 August 2023	Tuur Dierckx	KVC Westerlo	(Greece) Atromitos F.C.	Free
1 August 2023	(Denmark) Philip Zinckernagel	(Greece) Olympiacos F.C.	Club Brugge KV	Transfer
2 August 2023	(Georgia (country)) Giorgi Chakvetadze	KAA Gent	(England) Watford FC	Loan
2 August 2023	(Wales) Isaak Davies	(England) Cardiff City	KV Kortrijk	Loan
2 August 2023	(Ecuador) Luis Segovia	(Brazil) Botafogo FR	RWDM47	Loan
2 August 2023	(Japan) Kosei Tani	(Japan) Gamba Osaka	FCV Dender EH	Loan
3 August 2023	(Japan) Ayase Ueda	Cercle Brugge	(Netherlands) Feyenoord	Transfer
4 August 2023	(Denmark) Rasmus Carstensen	KRC Genk	(Germany) 1. FC Köln	Loan
4 August 2023	(United States) Kahveh Zahiroleslam	(United States) Yale Bulldogs	Sint-Truidense V.V.	Free
4 August 2023	(Gabon) Sidney Obissa	(France) AC Ajaccio	Francs Borains	Free
4 August 2023	Fabio Ferraro	RWDM47	FCV Dender EH	Transfer
4 August 2023	(Brazil) Caio Roque	Lommel S.K.	(Brazil) Esporte Clube Bahia	Transfer
4 August 2023	(Costa Rica) Alonso Martínez	Lommel S.K.	(United States) New York City FC	Transfer
5 August 2023	(Nigeria) Ishaq Abdulrazak	RSC Anderlecht	(Sweden) BK Häcken	Loan
5 August 2023	Rubin Seigers	KVC Westerlo	SV Zulte Waregem	Loan
5 August 2023	(Canada) Liam Fraser	KMSK Deinze	(United States) FC Dallas	Transfer
6 August 2023	(Japan) Zion Suzuki	(Japan) Urawa Red Diamonds	Sint-Truidense V.V.	Loan
7 August 2023	(Argentina) Nicolás Castro	KRC Genk	(Spain) Elche CF	Loan
7 August 2023	(Ivory Coast) Wilfried Kanga	(Germany) Hertha BSC	Standard Liège	Loan
7 August 2023	(France) Lucas Margueron	(France) Clermont Foot	R.F.C. Seraing	Free
7 August 2023	(England) Henry Lawrence	(England) Chelsea	Standard Liège	Free
8 August 2023	Senne Lynen	Royale Union Saint-Gilloise	(Germany) Werder Bremen	Transfer
8 August 2023	Noah Fadiga	(France) Stade Brestois 29	KAA Gent	Free
8 August 2023	(Spain) Alejandro Granados	(United States) Orlando City SC	Club Brugge KV	Transfer
8 August 2023	(Cameroon) Didier Lamkel Zé	KV Kortrijk	(Turkey) Hatayspor	Transfer
8 August 2023	Guillaume De Schryver	Lierse Kempenzonen	KMSK Deinze	Transfer
8 August 2023	Benjamin Pauwels	KAA Gent	K Beerschot VA	Free
8 August 2023	(Turkey) Ali Akman	(Germany) Eintracht Frankfurt	FCV Dender EH	Free
9 August 2023	(Brazil) Vinícius Souza	Lommel S.K.	(England) Sheffield United F.C.	Transfer
9 August 2023	(Germany) Jesaja Herrmann	KV Kortrijk	(Germany) SV Waldhof Mannheim	Transfer
10 August 2023	Josue Banewa Grelaud	OH Leuven	(Italy) Juventus FC	Transfer
10 August 2023	(United States) Gabriel Slonina	(England) Chelsea FC	KAS Eupen	Loan
10 August 2023	(Mexico) Jorge Ruvalcaba	(Mexico) UNAM	Standard Liège	Loan
10 August 2023	Alexandre De Bruyn	KV Kortrijk	Lierse Kempenzonen	Transfer
10 August 2023	(Netherlands) Bart Nieuwkoop	Royale Union Saint-Gilloise	(Netherlands) Feyenoord	Transfer
10 August 2023	(France) Théo Pierrot	Lommel S.K.	K. Patro Eisden Maasmechelen	Loan
11 August 2023	(France) Soumaïla Coulibaly	(Germany) Borussia Dortmund	R Antwerp FC	Loan
11 August 2023	(Kenya) Johanna Omolo	URSL Visé	KV Oostende	Free
11 August 2023	(England) Archie Brown	(Switzerland) FC Lausanne-Sport	KAA Gent	Transfer
11 August 2023	(Republic of Ireland) Joel Bagan	(England) Cardiff City	SV Zulte Waregem	Loan
12 August 2023	(France) Alexis Flips	(France) Stade de Reims	RSC Anderlecht	Transfer
13 August 2023	(France) Maxence Prévot	(France) FC Sochaux-Montbéliard	OH Leuven	Free
14 August 2023	(Kosovo) Laurit Krasniqi	R Antwerp FC	(Netherlands) Roda JC	Loan
14 August 2023	Gianni Bruno	KAA Gent	(Turkey) Eyüpspor	Transfer
14 August 2023	(France) Abdoulaye Sissako	SV Zulte Waregem	KV Kortrijk	Transfer
14 August 2023	(Algeria) Billel Messaoudi	KV Kortrijk	(Turkey) Göztepe S.K.	Loan
14 August 2023	(Costa Rica) Josimar Alcócer	(Costa Rica) Alajuelense	KVC Westerlo	Transfer
14 August 2023	(Norway) Jonatan Braut Brunes	(Norway) Strømsgodset	OH Leuven	Transfer
14 August 2023	(Australia) Keegan Jelacic	KAA Gent	(Norway) Stabæk Fotball	Loan
14 August 2023	(Haiti) Rousseau De Poorter	KMSK Deinze	Royal Knokke F.C.	Loan
15 August 2023	(Guadeloupe) Thierry Ambrose	KV Oostende	KV Kortrijk	Transfer
15 August 2023	Mats Rits	Club Brugge KV	RSC Anderlecht	Transfer
15 August 2023	Alec Van Hoorenbeeck	KV Mechelen	(Netherlands) FC Twente	Loan
16 August 2023	(Nigeria) Sheyi Ojo	(England) Cardiff City	KV Kortrijk	Loan
16 August 2023	(Mali) Boubou Diallo	Standard Liège	(Finland) FC Inter Turku	Loan
16 August 2023	(Sweden) Ludwig Augustinsson	(Spain) Sevilla FC	RSC Anderlecht	Loan
17 August 2023	(Spain) Víctor Álvarez	Free Agent	KMSK Deinze	Free
17 August 2023	(Croatia) Ivan Durdov	KV Oostende	(Spain) CD Mirandés	Loan
18 August 2023	(Iceland) Alfreð Finnbogason	(Denmark) Lyngby Boldklub	KAS Eupen	Transfer
18 August 2023	(Bulgaria) Kristiyan Malinov	OH Leuven	KV Kortrijk	Free
18 August 2023	(Israel) Omri Gandelman	(Israel) Maccabi Netanya	KAA Gent	Transfer
18 August 2023	(Algeria) Mohamed El Amine Amoura	(Switzerland) FC Lugano	Royale Union Saint-Gilloise	Transfer
18 August 2023	Amine Belhadj	S.K. Beveren	URSL Visé	Loan
19 August 2023	Tobe Leysen	KRC Genk	OH Leuven	Transfer
21 August 2023	(Denmark) Jacob Barrett Laursen	Standard Liège	(Sweden) BK Häcken	Transfer
21 August 2023	(Germany) Patrick Pflücke	(Switzerland) Servette FC	KV Mechelen	Transfer
21 August 2023	Cisse Sandra	Club Brugge KV	(Netherlands) Excelsior Rotterdam	Loan
22 August 2023	(Guinea) Mohamed Soumah	(Guinea) AS Kaloum Star	KAA Gent	Transfer
22 August 2023	Hannes Delcroix	RSC Anderlecht	(England) Burnley FC	Transfer
22 August 2023	(Argentina) Gastón Ávila	Royal Antwerp FC	(Netherlands) AFC Ajax	Transfer
22 August 2023	(Denmark) Thomas Delaney	(Spain) Sevilla FC	RSC Anderlecht	Loan
22 August 2023	(France) Adrien Trebel	RSC Anderlecht	RSC Charleroi	Free
22 August 2023	(Republic of the Congo) Morgan Poaty	R.F.C. Seraing	(Switzerland) FC Lausanne-Sport	Transfer
22 August 2023	(Sweden) Jesper Tolinsson	Lommel S.K.	(Sweden) IFK Norrköping	Loan
23 August 2023	(Senegal) Djibi Seck	(Senegal) Espoirs de Guédiawaye	KV Kortrijk	Transfer
23 August 2023	Fabrice Sambu	R.F.C. Seraing (1922)	RWDM47	Transfer
23 August 2023	(Norway) Benjamin Thoresen Faraas	(Norway) Hamarkameratene	Club Brugge	Transfer
24 August 2023	(Netherlands) Lucas Bijker	KV Mechelen	(Cyprus) Ethnikos Achna FC	Free
24 August 2023	(Niger) Amadou Sabo	(Sweden) Hammarby Fotboll	Royal Antwerp FC	Loan
24 August 2023	(Croatia) Leon Lalić	(Austria) FC Red Bull Salzburg	Lommel S.K.	Transfer
24 August 2023	Mohamed Guindo	(Italy) FC Pro Vercelli 1892	SV Zulte Waregem	Free
24 August 2023	(Scotland) Ewan Henderson	(Scotland) Hibernian F.C.	KV Oostende	Loan
24 August 2023	Lars Montegnies	KV Kortrijk	RSC Anderlecht	Free
25 August 2023	Lucas Pirard	Royale Union Saint-Gilloise	KV Kortrijk	Transfer
26 August 2023	(Colombia) Juanda Fuentes	(Spain) FC Barcelona	KV Oostende	Free
27 August 2023	(Rwanda) Maxime Wenssens	Free Agent	Royale Union Saint-Gilloise	Free
28 August 2023	(Mali) Youssouf Koné	(France) Olympique Lyonnais	RWDM47	Free
28 August 2023	(Serbia) Miloš Pantović	(Germany) 1. FC Union Berlin	KAS Eupen	Transfer
28 August 2023	(France) Andrew Jung	KV Oostende	(France) Valenciennes FC	Loan
28 August 2023	(Senegal) Djibril Diarra	(Senegal) Génération Foot	R.F.C. Seraing (1922)	Transfer
28 August 2023	(Senegal) Cheikhou Ndiaye	(Senegal) Génération Foot	R.F.C. Seraing (1922)	Transfer
28 August 2023	(Senegal) Pape Sy	(Senegal) Génération Foot	R.F.C. Seraing (1922)	Transfer
28 August 2023	(Senegal) Pape Moussa Fall	(Senegal) Génération Foot	R.F.C. Seraing (1922)	Transfer
28 August 2023	(Senegal) Mohamed Camara	(Senegal) Génération Foot	R.F.C. Seraing (1922)	Transfer
28 August 2023	(Burkina Faso) Abdoul Kader Ouattara	(Burkina Faso) Rahimo FC	Cercle Brugge	Free
29 August 2023	(France) Youssef Maziz	(France) FC Metz	OH Leuven	Transfer
29 August 2023	Kazeem Olaigbe	(England) Southampton	Cercle Brugge	Transfer
29 August 2023	(Senegal) Pape Habib Guèye	KV Kortrijk	(Scotland) Aberdeen F.C.	Transfer
29 August 2023	(Ivory Coast) Parfait Guiagon	(Israel) Maccabi Tel Aviv F.C.	RSC Charleroi	Transfer
29 August 2023	(France) Théo Ndicka	KV Oostende	(Switzerland) Grasshopper Club Zürich	Transfer
29 August 2023	(France) Maxime Mejjati-Alami	(France) FC Nantes	Standard Liège	Loan
29 August 2023	Dragan Lausberg	Royal Antwerp FC	OH Leuven	Free
29 August 2023	(Denmark) Yousef Salech	(Denmark) Brøndby IF	S.K. Beveren	Loan
29 August 2023	(Morocco) Soufiane Benjdida	(Morocco) Raja CA	Standard Liège	Transfer
30 August 2023	Youssuf Sylla	SV Zulte Waregem	RSC Charleroi	Transfer
30 August 2023	(Panama) Michael Amir Murillo	RSC Anderlecht	(France) Olympique de Marseille	Transfer
30 August 2023	(Israel) Osher Davida	Standard Liège	(Israel) Maccabi Tel Aviv F.C.	Transfer
30 August 2023	Jordy Soladio	(Vietnam) Song Lam Nghe An FC	FCV Dender EH	Free
30 August 2023	Baud Terwingen	K. Patro Eisden Maasmechelen	(Netherlands) MVV Maastricht	Loan
30 August 2023	(Brazil) Cauê	Lommel S.K.	(Portugal) S.L. Benfica	Loan
31 August 2023	(Mali) Mamadou Traoré	Royale Union Saint-Gilloise	(Spain) CD Castellón	Loan
31 August 2023	Jackson Tchatchoua	RSC Charleroi	(Italy) Hellas Verona FC	Loan
31 August 2023	Olivier Deman	Cercle Brugge	(Germany) SV Werder Bremen	Transfer
31 August 2023	Samuel Kondi Nibombe	RSC Charleroi	(France) AS Monaco FC	Free
31 August 2023	(Norway) Vetle Dragsnes	(Norway) Lillestrøm SK	RSC Charleroi	Transfer
31 August 2023	Arne Cuypers	K. Patro Eisden Maasmechelen	Sporting Hasselt	Loan
31 August 2023	Niels Verburgh	K. Patro Eisden Maasmechelen	Sporting Hasselt	Loan
31 August 2023	Keano Vanrafelghem	K. Patro Eisden Maasmechelen	Sporting Hasselt	Loan
31 August 2023	Simon Paulet	KVC Westerlo	R. Olympic Charleroi	Loan
1 September 2023	Ethan Butera	RSC Anderlecht	(Netherlands) AFC Ajax	Transfer
1 September 2023	Marco Kana	RSC Anderlecht	KV Kortrijk	Loan
1 September 2023	(Germany) Christopher Scott	Royal Antwerp F.C.	(Germany) Hannover 96	Loan
1 September 2023	(Australia) Rhys Youlley	(Australia) Macarthur FC	KVC Westerlo	Transfer
1 September 2023	(Ukraine) Roman Yaremchuk	Club Brugge	(Spain) Valencia CF	Loan
1 September 2023	Norman Bassette	(France) Stade Malherbe Caen	KV Mechelen	Loan
1 September 2023	(Ghana) Emmanuel Toku	OH Leuven	(Denmark) Aalborg Boldspilklub	Loan
1 September 2023	(Sierra Leone) Mustapha Bundu	RSC Anderlecht	(England) Plymouth Argyle F.C.	Transfer
1 September 2023	(Cameroon) Frank Boya	Royal Antwerp FC	(France) Amiens SC	Transfer
1 September 2023	(Denmark) Jonathan Foss	Club Brugge	(Germany) Borussia Mönchengladbach	Loan
1 September 2023	(Tanzania) Novatus Miroshi	SV Zulte Waregem	(Ukraine) FC Shakhtar Donetsk	Loan
1 September 2023	Leandre Kuavita	Standard Liège	(Italy) Genoa CFC	Loan
1 September 2023	Sacha Banse	Standard Liège	(France) Valenciennes FC	Loan
1 September 2023	Mike Trésor	KRC Genk	(England) Burnley FC	Loan
1 September 2023	Dimitri Lavalée	KV Mechelen	(Austria) SK Sturm Graz	Loan
1 September 2023	(Venezuela) Daniel Pérez	Club Brugge	KV Oostende	Loan
1 September 2023	Stef Peeters	KAS Eupen	K. Patro Eisden Maasmechelen	Free
1 September 2023	(Brazil) Matheus Machado	(Bulgaria) PFC Cherno More Varna	SV Zulte Waregem	Transfer
1 September 2023	(Germany) Luis Hartwig	(Germany) VfL Bochum	KV Oostende	Transfer
1 September 2023	(France) Félix Lemaréchal	(France) AS Monaco FC	Cercle Brugge	Loan
1 September 2023	(Ecuador) Kevin Rodríguez	(Ecuador) Independiente del Valle	Royale Union Saint-Gilloise	Transfer
1 September 2023	(Turkey) Bertan Caliskan	KAA Gent	KAS Eupen	Free
1 September 2023	Lucas Beerten	KRC Genk	(Netherlands) Roda JC Kerkrade	Free
1 September 2023	(Netherlands) Jerrel Hak	(Netherlands) Quick Boys	K Beerschot VA	Transfer
1 September 2023	(Norway) Aron Dønnum	Standard Liège	(France) Toulouse FC	Transfer
1 September 2023	(Curaçao) Joshua Zimmerman	OH Leuven	(Netherlands) TOP Oss	Transfer
2 September 2023	Alessio Castro-Montes	KAA Gent	Royale Union Saint-Gilloise	Transfer
2 September 2023	(France) Faitout Maouassa	Club Brugge	(France) RC Lens	Loan
4 September 2023	(Ecuador) Ángelo Preciado	KRC Genk	(Czech Republic) AC Sparta Prague	Transfer
4 September 2023	(Romania) Valentin Cojocaru	OH Leuven	(Poland) Pogoń Szczecin	Loan
4 September 2023	(Netherlands) Simon van Duivenbooden	(Netherlands) SBV Vitesse	K. Patro Eisden Maasmechelen	Loan
5 September 2023	(Netherlands) Owen Wijndal	(Netherlands) AFC Ajax	Royal Antwerp FC	Loan
5 September 2023	(Switzerland) Andi Zeqiri	(England) Brighton & Hove Albion	KRC Genk	Transfer
5 September 2023	(Morocco) Zakaria El Ouahdi	RWDM47	KRC Genk	Transfer
5 September 2023	(England) Alex Mighten	(England) Nottingham Forest F.C.	KV Kortrijk	Loan
5 September 2023	(England) Isaac Hayden	(England) Newcastle United	Standard Liège	Loan
5 September 2023	(Ukraine) Serhiy Sydorchuk	(Ukraine) FC Dynamo Kyiv	KVC Westerlo	Transfer
5 September 2023	(Mali) Moussa Djenepo	(England) Southampton FC	Standard Liège	Transfer
5 September 2023	(Northern Ireland) Craig Cathcart	(England) Watford F.C.	KV Kortrijk	Free
5 September 2023	Noam Mayoka-Tika	KVC Westerlo	(France) Olympique de Marseille	Free
5 September 2023	Elias Cobbaut	(Italy) Parma Calcio 1913	KV Mechelen	Loan
5 September 2023	Viktor Boone	Royale Union Saint-Gilloise	Lierse Kempenzonen	Loan
5 September 2023	Stan Van Dessel	Sint-Truidense V.V.	Lierse Kempenzonen	Transfer
5 September 2023	(Denmark) Kasper Schmeichel	(France) OGC Nice	RSC Anderlecht	Free
6 September 2023	(Ghana) Kamal Sowah	Club Brugge	Standard Liège	Loan
6 September 2023	(Scotland) Robbie Ure	(Scotland) Rangers F.C.	RSC Anderlecht	Free
6 September 2023	(Senegal) Pathé Mboup	(France) Olympique Lyonnais	RWDM47	Transfer
6 September 2023	(France) Jeff Reine-Adélaïde	(France) Olympique Lyonnais	RWDM47	Transfer
6 September 2023	(Madagascar) Romain Métanire	Free Agent	R.F.C. Seraing (1922)	Free
6 September 2023	(Turkey) Emin Bayram	(Turkey) Galatasaray S.K.	KVC Westerlo	Loan
6 September 2023	(Turkey) Doğucan Haspolat	(Turkey) Trabzonspor	KVC Westerlo	Transfer
6 September 2023	(Republic of Ireland) Danny McGrath	(Republic of Ireland) Bohemian F.C.	Lommel S.K.	Transfer
6 September 2023	(France) Romaric Etonde	(France) AS Monaco FC	Cercle Brugge	Loan
6 September 2023	(Mali) Mahamadou Doumbia	(Mali) JMG Academy Bamako	Royal Antwerp F.C.	Transfer
6 September 2023	(Brazil) Kayque	(Brazil) Botafogo	RWDM47	Loan
6 September 2023	(Portugal) Flávio Nazinho	(Portugal) Sporting CP	Cercle Brugge	Loan
6 September 2023	(Mali) Moussa Sissako	(Russia) PFC Sochi	RWDM47	Loan
6 September 2023	(Ukraine) Mark Mampassi	(Russia) FC Lokomotiv Moscow	KV Kortrijk	Loan
6 September 2023	Anthony Limbombe	(Netherlands) Almere City FC	S.K. Beveren	Transfer
6 September 2023	(England) Ryan Alebiosu	(England) Arsenal	KV Kortrijk	Transfer
6 September 2023	Thorgan Hazard	(Germany) Borussia Dortmund	RSC Anderlecht	Transfer
6 September 2023	(England) Jamal Baptiste	(England) Manchester City	Lommel S.K.	Loan
6 September 2023	(Cameroon) Patrick Handzongo	(Cameroon) APEJES Academy	SV Zulte Waregem	Free
6 September 2023	(France) Mounaïm El Idrissy	(France) AC Ajaccio	KV Kortrijk	Transfer
6 September 2023	(Ivory Coast) Bi Abdoul Kader	(Ivory Coast) ASEC Mimosas	Club Brugge	Transfer
6 September 2023	(Benin) Désiré Segbé Azankpo	(Germany) FC Bayern Munich	R.F.C. Seraing	Transfer
6 September 2023	(Germany) Emilio Kehrer	Cercle Brugge	KMSK Deinze	Loan
6 September 2023	(Nigeria) Jordan Attah Kadiri	Lommel S.K.	Francs Borains	Loan
6 September 2023	Lucca Lucker	Cercle Brugge	RFC Liège	Free
6 September 2023	Robbe Decostere	Cercle Brugge	SV Zulte Waregem	Transfer
6 September 2023	Massimo Decoene	KV Kortrijk	KV Oostende	Loan
6 September 2023	Ilay Camara	RSC Anderlecht	RWDM47	Transfer
6 September 2023	Arnaud Dony	Royale Union Saint-Gilloise	FCV Dender EH	Loan
6 September 2023	Stan Braem	SV Zulte Waregem	K.S.C. Lokeren-Temse	Loan
6 September 2023	Lennert Hallaert	SV Zulte Waregem	Royal Knokke F.C.	Loan
6 September 2023	(Ivory Coast) Fernand Gouré	KVC Westerlo	(Slovakia) FC DAC 1904	Loan
6 September 2023	(Ukraine) Valeriy Dubko	FCV Dender EH	(Ukraine) FC Obolon Kyiv	Transfer
6 September 2023	Daan Dierckx	(Italy) Parma Calcio 1913	Standard Liège	Transfer
6 September 2023	(Georgia (country)) Giorgi Moistsrapishvili	(Georgia (country)) FC Dinamo Tbilisi	S.K. Beveren	Loan
6 September 2023	(France) Yanis Massolin	(France) Clermont Foot	Francs Borains	Transfer
6 September 2023	(Ivory Coast) Eric Konaté	(Ivory Coast) FC Treichville	Francs Borains	Transfer
6 September 2023	(Republic of the Congo) Déo Bassinga	(Republic of the Congo) CSMD Diables Noirs	KAA Gent	Transfer
6 September 2023	(Republic of the Congo) Ceti Tchibinda	(Republic of the Congo) CSMD Diables Noirs	KAA Gent	Transfer
6 September 2023	(Thailand) Suphanat Mueanta	(Thailand) Buriram United F.C.	OH Leuven	Loan
6 September 2023	Isaac Asante	OH Leuven	KV Mechelen	Free
6 September 2023	Zakaria Atteri	FCV Dender EH	RFC Liège	Free
6 September 2023	(France) Nicolas Mercier	(France) AJ Auxerre	KMSK Deinze	Loan
