= 2022–23 Belgian National Division 1 =

Belgian National Division 1
- Season: 2022–23
- Dates: 18 August 2022 – 21 May 2023
- Champions: Patro Eisden
- Promoted: Patro Eisden; RFC Liège; Francs Borains
- Relegated: Ninove; Rupel Boom; Mandel United
- Matches: 380
- Goals: 1,125 (2.96 per match)
- Top goalscorer: Teddy Chevalier (31 goals)

The 2022–23 Belgian National Division 1 is the seventh season of the third-tier football league in Belgium and the first one in which U23 teams are admitted into the league, due to the last minute bankruptcy of Roeselare. It is the third season under its new name after being renamed from First Amateur Division. The league began on 18 August 2022 and is scheduled to end on 21 May 2023.

== Team changes ==
=== Out ===
Two teams moved to another level:

- Dender EH was promoted as champions of the previous season.
- La Louvière Centre was relegated after finishing last. They were the only team relegated as the previous season was played with one team less due to the bankruptcy of Roeselare, and Mandel United remained in the league after winning the Belgian Division 2 Promotion play-offs.

=== In ===
Three teams were promoted from the 2021–22 Belgian Division 2:

- Ninove, runner-up of the Belgian Division 2 VV A as champions Sparta Petegem did not apply for a licence.
- Hoogstraten, winners of the Belgian Division 2 VV B.
- RAAL La Louvière, winners of the Belgian Division 2 ACFF.

Four U23 teams were added to the league as it was expanded. The teams joining were determined based on their finishing position in the 2021–22 Belgian U23 league:

- Jong KAA Gent
- OH Leuven U-23
- Young Reds Antwerp
- Zébra Élites Charleroi

== Format changes ==
Four U23 teams were added to the league as part of a two-season trial, expanding the league from 16 to 20 teams. These twenty teams will play each other twice in a regular competition. At the end of season, the top three teams will be automatically promoted to the 2023–24 Challenger Pro League. Due to reduce the size back from 20 to 18 teams. The three bottom teams will be automatically relegated to 2023–24 Belgian Division 2. U23 teams can be promoted to Challenger Pro League. The 17th place will face relegation play-off.

== Team information ==
Locations of the 2022–23 Belgian National Division 1 teams

== Regular season ==
=== League table ===
Pos	Team	Pld	W	D	L	GF	GA	GD	Pts	Qualification or relegation
1	Patro Eisden (C, P)	38	26	8	4	84	23	+61	86	Promoted to the Challenger Pro League
2	RFC Liège (P)	38	25	11	2	99	29	+70	86	Promoted to the Challenger Pro League
3	Francs Borains (P)	38	23	8	7	79	46	+33	77	Promoted to the Challenger Pro League
4	RAAL La Louvière	38	22	7	9	72	39	+33	73	
5	Jong KAA Gent	38	19	10	9	59	43	+16	67	
6	Heist	38	16	13	9	69	59	+10	61	
7	Olympic Charleroi CF	38	18	6	14	71	52	+19	60	
8	Knokke	38	18	6	14	65	58	+7	60	
9	Visé	38	15	11	12	66	52	+14	56	
10	Thes	38	13	14	11	58	52	+6	53	
11	OH Leuven U-23	38	15	6	17	61	68	−7	50 (Note: OH Leuven U23 was deducted 1 point for not fielding a sufficient number of home-grown players in their home match against Olympic Charleroi.)	
12	Tienen	38	12	10	16	50	60	−10	46	
13	Zébra Élites Charleroi	38	12	8	18	41	58	−17	44	
14	Dessel	38	11	10	17	45	65	−20	43	
15	Sint-Eloois-Winkel	38	11	9	18	44	58	−14	42	
16	Hoogstraten	38	11	8	19	46	60	−14	41	
17	Young Reds Antwerp (O)	38	11	6	21	33	58	−25	39	Qualification for the Division 2 Promotion play-offs Final
18	Ninove (Note: On 1 March 2023, the club released a statement that it was not applying for a football license and purposely decided to be relegated to the 2023–24 Belgian Division 2. Irrespective of its finishing position, Ninove will now always take up one of the direct relegation spots.) (R)	38	10	5	23	39	75	−36	35	Relegation to Division 2
19	Rupel Boom (R)	38	6	6	26	29	83	−54	24	Relegation to Division 2
20	Mandel United (R)	38	4	2	32	16	88	−72	14	Relegation to Division 2

Source: RFBA
Rules for classification: 1) Points; 2) Matches won; 3) Goal difference; 4) Goals scored; 5) Away goals scored; 6) Away matches won.
(C) Champions; (O) Play-off winners; (P) Promoted; (R) Relegated

=== Results ===
Home \ Away	PEM	RFC	LAL	OLC	HEI	GNT	TES	KNO	TIE	OHL	FRB	SEW	VIS	YRA	NIN	ZEB	RUP	DES	MAN	HOO
Patro Eisden Maasmechelen	—	1–1	2–1	2–1	1–1	2–0	0–0	2–0	2–1	3–0	4–0	2–1	0–0	4–0	5–0	4–0	0–0	3–0	2–0	1–1
RFC Liège	2–1	—	2–0	2–1	0–0	4–1	3–1	6–2	1–1	3–1	3–1	5–3	2–0	3–1	6–0	2–1	5–0	6–0	9–0	2–1
RAAL La Louvière	2–1	0–3	—	1–1	6–2	1–1	1–1	2–0	3–1	2–0	0–1	4–2	2–1	2–1	3–0	1–0	4–1	0–0	3–0	4–0
Olympic Charleroi CF	2–1	0–0	2–1	—	1–3	0–2	2–0	0–2	2–1	1–3	0–1	2–1	3–1	6–0	3–0	2–0	3–0	1–2	2–0	2–1
Heist	1–1	1–1	3–1	1–3	—	3–4	1–1	2–0	2–0	1–1	2–1	2–0	6–2	2–2	3–2	1–3	3–1	2–2	4–1	0–2
Jong KAA Gent	0–2	2–2	0–1	4–2	0–2	—	1–0	0–1	1–0	4–0	0–3	0–0	2–2	2–1	3–1	2–0	3–2	3–1	2–0	3–1
Thes	1–1	1–1	1–1	3–3	3–1	2–1	—	2–1	3–3	3–1	1–0	1–1	2–1	1–2	0–0	2–2	3–0	1–1	6–0	2–3
Knokke	1–2	0–3	0–3	3–2	4–1	1–3	2–0	—	2–2	4–0	1–1	2–0	2–2	1–2	4–1	2–1	1–0	4–1	1–0	5–4
Tienen	0–4	0–0	1–0	1–1	2–2	0–4	2–0	2–0	—	4–1	1–3	0–3	1–1	0–1	1–1	1–4	1–0	1–6	2–0	1–1
OH Leuven U-23	1–2	1–4	0–3	2–2	2–2	5–1	0–0	1–2	2–1	—	2–2	4–0	0–4	1–1	3–1	4–0	1–2	3–1	2–1	1–0
Francs Borains	0–5	3–2	5–0 (Note: Match stopped with 88 minutes played as RAAL La Louvière supporters invaded the pitch. Francs Borains was leading 3-1 and was credited with a forfeit win 5-0.)	3–1	4–2	0–0	2–1	2–2	2–1	2–1	—	2–0	1–2	2–0	1–0	1–1	5–0	2–1	3–1	3–0
Sint-Eloois-Winkel	1–1	1–1	2–4	3–0	2–1	2–2	2–3	1–0	1–2	2–4	2–1	—	1–3	3–1	0–0	0–0	0–3	1–1	1–0	0–1
Visé	2–5	0–1	1–0	1–0	1–1	1–1	3–0	2–1	0–1	1–3	3–3	2–0	—	2–3	0–0	2–2	4–0	3–3	1–0	1–0
Young Reds Antwerp	0–2	1–0	1–3	1–3	1–1	0–0	0–1	0–1	3–0	2–0	0–4	0–0	2–1	—	2–3	0–1	1–0	0–1	0–1	0–0
Ninove	0–2	0–3	1–3	3–1	0–1	0–1	2–1	1–2	1–1	1–2	1–2	2–1	0–3	3–1	—	2–0	1–0	1–2	1–2	1–4
Zébra Élites Charleroi	1–3	1–2	0–0	0–1	0–1	0–2	1–4	3–2	2–2	1–3	0–3	1–2	3–2	1–0	3–1	—	2–0	0–0	1–0	1–0
Rupel Boom	0–2	0–4	0–3	1–3	3–3	0–1	1–3	1–1	0–5 (Note: Match stopped with 7 seconds played after one of the floodlights stopped working due to a fire in the fusebox and the home team was not able to repair the issue within 30 minutes. Rupel Boom hence lost the match with a 0–5 forfeit score.)	0–2	4–4	0–0	0–3	1–0	1–2	1–0	—	2–1	1–2	1–1
Dessel	0–4	1–4	0–0	0–2	1–3	0–0	2–2	0–4	0–1	1–0	1–4	1–0	1–1	0–1	1–3	2–0	4–1	—	3–0	1–2
Mandel United	0–3	0–0	1–2	0–8	0–1	0–2	0–2	0–1	0–3	1–2	1–1	0–3	0–3	2–1	1–2	1–2	1–2	0–2	—	0–3
Hoogstraten	1–2	1–1	2–6	1–3	0–1	1–1	4–0	3–3	1–0	3–2	0–1	0–1	0–4	0–2	1–1	1–2	1–0	0–1	1–0	—

Source: Nationaal : 1st klasse (in Dutch)
Legend: Blue = home team win; Yellow = draw; Red = away team win.

== Season statistics ==
=== Top scorers ===
As of 21 May 2023.

Rank	Player	Club	Goals
1	(France) Teddy Chevalier	Francs Borains	31
1	(France) Jérémy Perbet	RFC Liège	31
2	(Belgium) Adriano Bertaccini	Thes	26
3	(Albania) Din Sula	Knokke	22
4	(Belgium) Mohamed Soumaré	RAAL La Louvière	17
5	(Belgium) Olivier Romero Gómez	Ninove	16
5	(France) Corenthyn Lavie	Francs Borains	16
6	(Curaçao) Joshua Zimmerman	OH Leuven U23	15
7	(Belgium) Adrien Bongiovanni	Zébra Élites Charleroi	14
8	(Belgium) Roman Ferber	Patro Eisden Maasmechelen	13
