= Hugo Weckmann =

Mexican footballer (born 2004)

Personal information
- Full name: Hugo Isaac Weckmann Ortega
- Date of birth: 10 April 2004 (age 22)
- Place of birth: Chihuahua, Mexico
- Height: 1.91 m (6 ft 3 in)
- Position: Forward

Team information
- Current team: Pachuca
- Number: 229

Youth career
- 2017–2022: Club Tijuana

Senior career*
Years	Team	Apps	(Gls)
2022	Club Tijuana	1	(0)
2023–2025	Lommel	0	(0)
2025–	Pachuca	0	(0)

International career
2018	Mexico U15		
- * Club domestic league appearances and goals as of 31 May 2026

Hugo Isaac Weckmann Ortega (born 10 April 2004) is a Mexican professional footballer who plays as a forward for Liga MX club Pachuca.

== Club career ==
Born in the Mexican state of Chihuahua, Weckmann was raised in Tijuana, and began his career in the academy of Club Tijuana at the age of twelve in 2017. On 17 February 2022, having trained with the club's under-18 side and travelled to the United States to relax, he returned to Mexico after receiving a call from coaches informing him that he may make his debut the following day. He made his debut in the 1–1 draw with Club Necaxa on 18 February, coming on as a late substitute for Facundo Ferreyra.

Having not featured for the club in the following season, he terminated his contract before the start of the Clausura 2023, travelling to Europe to trial with Portuguese club Porto. Having also trialled with City Football Group (CFG) side Troyes, he would instead join fellow-CFG club Lommel in July 2023.

== International career ==
In 2018 Weckmann was called up to the Mexico under-15 side.

== Career statistics ==
=== Club ===
As of match played 31 May 2026

Appearances and goals by club, season and competition
Club	Season	League			Cup		Continental		Other		Total	
Club	Season	Division	Apps	Goals	Apps	Goals	Apps	Goals	Apps	Goals	Apps	Goals
Club Tijuana	2021–22	Liga MX	1	0	–		–		–		1	0
Club Tijuana	2022–23	Liga MX	0	0	–		—		—		0	0
Club Tijuana	Total		1	0	0	0	0	0	0	0	1	0
Lommel	2022–23	Challenger Pro League	0	0	–		–		–		0	0
Lommel	2023–24	Challenger Pro League	0	0	–		–		–		0	0
Lommel	2024–25	Challenger Pro League	0	0	0	0	–		–		0	0
Lommel	Total		0	0	0	0	0	0	0	0	0	0
Career total			1	0	0	0	0	0	0	0	1	0
