= Aron van Lare =

Dutch footballer (born 2003)

Personal information
- Date of birth: 5 January 2003 (age 23)
- Place of birth: Terneuzen, Netherlands
- Height: 1.90 m (6 ft 3 in)
- Position: Goalkeeper

Team information
- Current team: Hoogstraten
- Number: 1

Youth career
- VV Terneuzen
- –2016: JVOZ
- 2016–2017: NAC Breda
- 2017–2021: VV Terneuzen

Senior career*
Years	Team	Apps	(Gls)
2021–2022	Jong PSV	2	(0)
2022–2025	NAC Breda	0	(0)
2025	Kloetinge	3	(0)
2026–	Hoogstraten	3	(0)

International career
2017–2018	Netherlands U15	4	(0)
2018–2019	Netherlands U16	2	(0)
2019	Netherlands U17	1	(0)
2022	Netherlands U19	1	(0)
- * Club domestic league appearances and goals as of 3 May 2026

Aron van Lare (born 5 January 2003) is a Dutch footballer who plays as a goalkeeper for Hoogstraten.
