= Flemish Cup =

Belgian men's football cup competition

- Organiser(s): Voetbal Vlaanderen and VACHA
- Founded: 2025; 1 year ago
- Region: Flanders, Belgium
- Teams: 80
- Related competitions: Belgian Cup; Provincial Cups
- 2026–27 Flemish Cup

The Flemish Cup (Dutch: Beker van Vlaanderen) is a men's association football knockout cup competition for clubs from the higher amateur divisions of Flanders, the Dutch-speaking region of Belgium. It is organised jointly by the regional federation Voetbal Vlaanderen and VACHA (Vlaamse Amateurclubs van de Hogere Afdelingen, the association of Flemish amateur clubs from the higher divisions).

The competition was announced in December 2025 and runs alongside the existing Belgian Cup and the provincial cups, on which the format is based. As only clubs from the Belgian Provincial Leagues (tiers 6–9) can take part in the provincial cups, the Flemish Cup was designed to allow non-professional clubs at higher levels to also participate in a separate cup tournament, in a similar fashion to the FA Trophy. Therefore, only clubs playing in tiers 3–5 and from the Flemish region are eligible for the Flemish Cup, thus covering (the Flemish clubs in) the Belgian Division 1, Belgian Division 2, and Belgian Division 3.

The inaugural edition, the 2026–27 Flemish Cup, begins in July 2026 and finishes with a final scheduled for 1 May 2027. The winner of the Flemish Cup qualifies for the Round of 32 of the 2027–28 Belgian Cup, with the exception that U23-teams are ineligible, the runner-up (or next highest ranked) qualifying instead in that case.

== History ==
Voetbal Vlaanderen and VACHA announced the launch of the new competition on 11 December 2025. The federation described the cup as an ambitious step in the further development, visibility and professionalisation of Flemish amateur football, at a time when fixture schedules in the professional game are contracting. VACHA chairman Steven Van Geeteruyen said the new competition met a long-standing request from clubs for an extra tournament built around ambition and footballing passion in Flanders.

The competition is designed to fit into clubs' pre-season preparations, and is intended to replace most pre-season friendlies and add an element of competitiveness, with the group phase played in the middle of summer before the knockout phase carries on through the season.

== Format ==
The Flemish Cup is open to the 80 clubs playing in Voetbal Vlaanderen's three highest national amateur divisions: the First Division VV (one series of 16 clubs), the Second Division VV (two series, A and B, of 16 clubs each) and the Third Division VV (two series, A and B, of 16 clubs each).

The format is modelled on the revamped league-phase structure of the UEFA Champions League, and is identical to the format used for the Cup of Antwerp. In the group stage, the 80 entrants are divided into four groups of 20 clubs (Groups A, B, C and D), with the draw conducted geographically so as to keep travel to a minimum. Each club plays four group matches, two at home and two away, across four matchdays held between late July and mid-August. The top four clubs in each group advance to the knockout phase.

Group standings are decided, in order, by: points; number of wins; goal difference; goals scored; away wins; away goal difference; and away goals scored.

In the knockout phase, the best-placed 16 clubs compete in a single-elimination format starting with the round of 16. The four highest-placed clubs in Group A are drawn against the four highest-placed clubs in Group B, and likewise Group C against Group D; within each cross-group pairing, the club ranked first plays the club ranked fourth and the club ranked second plays the club ranked third, with the higher-ranked club hosting the match. From the round of 16 onward, every round is a single match with no replay: if the scores are level after 90 minutes, the tie is decided directly by a penalty shoot-out, without extra time.

== See also ==
- 2026–27 Flemish Cup
- Belgian Cup
- Voetbal Vlaanderen
