= Lennert Hallaert =

Belgian footballer

Personal information
- Full name: Lennert Willy Hallaert
- Date of birth: 17 April 2003 (age 23)
- Place of birth: Belgium
- Height: 1.87 m (6 ft 2 in)
- Position: Forward

Team information
- Current team: Zelzate
- Number: 35

Youth career
- Club Brugge
- 2021–2022: Zulte Waregem

Senior career*
Years	Team	Apps	(Gls)
2020–2021	Club NXT	3	(0)
2022–2023	Zulte Waregem	5	(0)
2022–2025	Jong Essevee	56	(24)
2023–2024	→ Knokke (loan)	19	(0)
2025–	Zelzate	30	(12)

International career
2018	Belgium U15	2	(2)
2018–2019	Belgium U16	6	(0)
- * Club domestic league appearances and goals as of 3 May 2026

Lennert Willy Hallaert (born 17 April 2003) is a Belgian professional footballer who plays as a forward for Zelzate.

== Club career ==
On 31 January 2021, Sabbe made his debut for Brugge's reserve side, Club NXT in the Belgian First Division B against Seraing.

In the summer of 2021, Hallaert signed with Zulte Waregem, where he was originally assigned to the Under-21 squad. Next summer, he signed his first professional contract with the club. On 5 August 2022, he made his Belgian First Division A debut for Zulte Waregem against Club Brugge.

On 3 September 2023, Hallaert was loaned by Knokke.

== Career statistics ==
=== Club ===
As of match played 4 February 2021

Appearances and goals by club, season and competition
Club	Season	League			Cup		Continental		Total	
Club	Season	Division	Apps	Goals	Apps	Goals	Apps	Goals	Apps	Goals
Club NXT	2020–21	Belgian First Division B	1	0	—	—	—	—	1	0
Career total			1	0	0	0	0	0	1	0
