= Jilke Deconinck =

Belgian footballer

Personal information
- Date of birth: 9 January 1995 (age 31)
- Place of birth: Gent, Belgium
- Height: 1.76 m (5 ft 9 in)
- Position: Midfielder

Team information
- Current team: Zelzate
- Number: 44

Youth career
- –2013: Cercle Brugge

Senior career*
Years	Team	Apps	(Gls)
2013–2016	Cercle Brugge	7	(0)
2016	→ Torhout (loan)	14	(0)
2016–2024	Eendracht Aalst	160	(19)
2024–	Zelzate	58	(15)
- * Club domestic league appearances and goals as of 3 May 2026

Jilke Deconinck (born 9 January 1995) is a Belgian professional footballer who plays as a midfielder for Zelzate.

== Club career ==
Deconick made his debut on 29 September 2013 at the 9th matchday of the season in the Jupiler Pro League. Cercle lost the home match with 0–5 against leader Standard. Deconick substituted Gaël Etock after 81 minutes. One week later again he came in the field after a substitution in the won away game against KV Mechelen.
