= Jhon Banguera =

Colombian footballer (born 2004)

Personal information
- Full name: Jhon Anderson Banguera Riascos
- Date of birth: 3 April 2004 (age 22)
- Place of birth: Buenaventura, Valle del Cauca, Colombia
- Height: 1.92 m (6 ft 4 in)
- Position: Central defender

Team information
- Current team: Lommel
- Number: 13

Youth career
- 2015-2018: Atlético Bocana,Envigado Palmira
- 2019–2022: Envigado

Senior career*
Years	Team	Apps	(Gls)
2022–2023	Envigado	20	(1)
2023–	Lommel	33	(2)
- * Club domestic league appearances and goals as of 20 April 2026

Jhon Anderson Banguera Riascos (born 3 April 2004) is a Colombian footballer who plays as a central-defender for Belgian club Lommel.

== Club career ==
Born in Buenaventura in the Valle del Cauca Department of Colombia, Banguera began his career with Envigado's affiliate side in Palmira, before a move to the club's main team in Envigado in 2019. On 18 May 2023, having broken into the first-team the previous season, Banguera scored an own goal in an eventual 2–1 away loss to Deportivo Pasto. Due to the nature of the own goal, many fans on social media suggested that Banguera had intentionally scored against his own side, as they believed he had enough time to successfully clear the ball. Some fans resorted to sending death threats to not only Banguera, but his family as well.

Speaking to Bluradio, Envigado head coach Alberto Suárez came to Benguera's defence, pleading with fans to stop their abusive messages. He also explained that, as Banguera was left-footed, and the ball had fallen to his right foot before he had scored the own-goal, it was simply a mistake.

In 2023, he was signed by the City Group and sent to Lommel in Belgium.

== Career statistics ==
=== Club ===
As of 2 June 2023.

Appearances and goals by club, season and competition
Club	Season	League			Cup		Continental		Other		Total	
Club	Season	Division	Apps	Goals	Apps	Goals	Apps	Goals	Apps	Goals	Apps	Goals
Envigado	2022	Categoría Primera A	4	0	2 (Note: Appearances in the Copa Colombia)	0	–		0	0	6	0
Envigado	2023	Categoría Primera A	16	1	3	0	–		0	0	19	1
Career total			20	1	5	0	0	0	0	0	25	1
