= Ayoub El Harrak =

Belgian footballer

Personal information
- Date of birth: January 28, 1999 (age 27)
- Place of birth: Magnée, Belgium
- Height: 1.74 m (5 ft 9 in)
- Position: Midfielder

Team information
- Current team: Tienen
- Number: 22

Senior career*
Years	Team	Apps	(Gls)
2018–2020	Eupen	1	(0)
2020–2023	URSL Visé	40	(2)
2023–	Tienen	80	(10)
- * Club domestic league appearances and goals as of 3 May 2026

Ayoub El Harrak (born 28 January 1999) is a Belgian professional footballer who plays as a midfielder for the Belgian club Tienen.

== Professional career ==
El Harrak made his professional debut with K.A.S. Eupen in a Belgian First Division A 3–1 loss to Beerschot on 19 May 2018. On 13 June 2019, El Harrak signed his first professional contract with Eupen.

In August 2020, it was announced that El Harrak signed a three-year contract with URSL Visé.
