= Youssef Boulaouali =

Moroccan footballer

Personal information
- Date of birth: 26 December 1992 (age 33)
- Place of birth: Nador, Morocco
- Height: 1.76 m (5 ft 9 in)
- Position: Midfielder

Team information
- Current team: ASV Geel
- Number: 11

Senior career*
Years	Team	Apps	(Gls)
2012–2015	Cappellen	94	(21)
2015–2016	Heist	31	(12)
2016–2018	Beerschot Wilrijk	27	(4)
2018–2020	Lierse	38	(8)
2020–2021	Dessel Sport		
2021–2023	Lokeren	52	(11)
2023–2025	Lyra-Lierse	16	(3)
2025–	ASV Geel	0	(0)
- * Club domestic league appearances and goals as of 16 January 2026

Youssef Boulaouali (born 26 December 1992) is a Moroccan footballer who plays as a midfielder for ASV Geel.

== Club career ==
Youssef Boulaouali started his career with R. Cappellen F.C.
