= KVK Tienen =

Belgian football club

- Full name: Koninklijke Voetbal Klub Tienen
- Founded: 1921; 105 years ago (as R.C. Tirlemont)
- Ground: Bergéstadion, Tienen
- Capacity: 7,100
- Manager: Johan Froment
- Coach: Wouter Hias
- League: National Division 1
- 2022–23: National Division 1, 12th of 20
Home colours	Away colours

Koninklijke Voetbal Klub Tienen is a Belgian association football club from the city of Tienen, Flemish Brabant. It is currently playing in the Belgian National Division 1, the third tier of Belgian football.

== History ==
The club was founded in 1921 as R.C. Tirlemont (Tirlemont is the French for Tienen) and it became a member of the Belgian Football Association in 1922 with matricule number 132. It reached the second division in 1931 and it won its league in 1937 to access to the first division. However it remained only one season at the top level as the club finished 14th and last of the division.

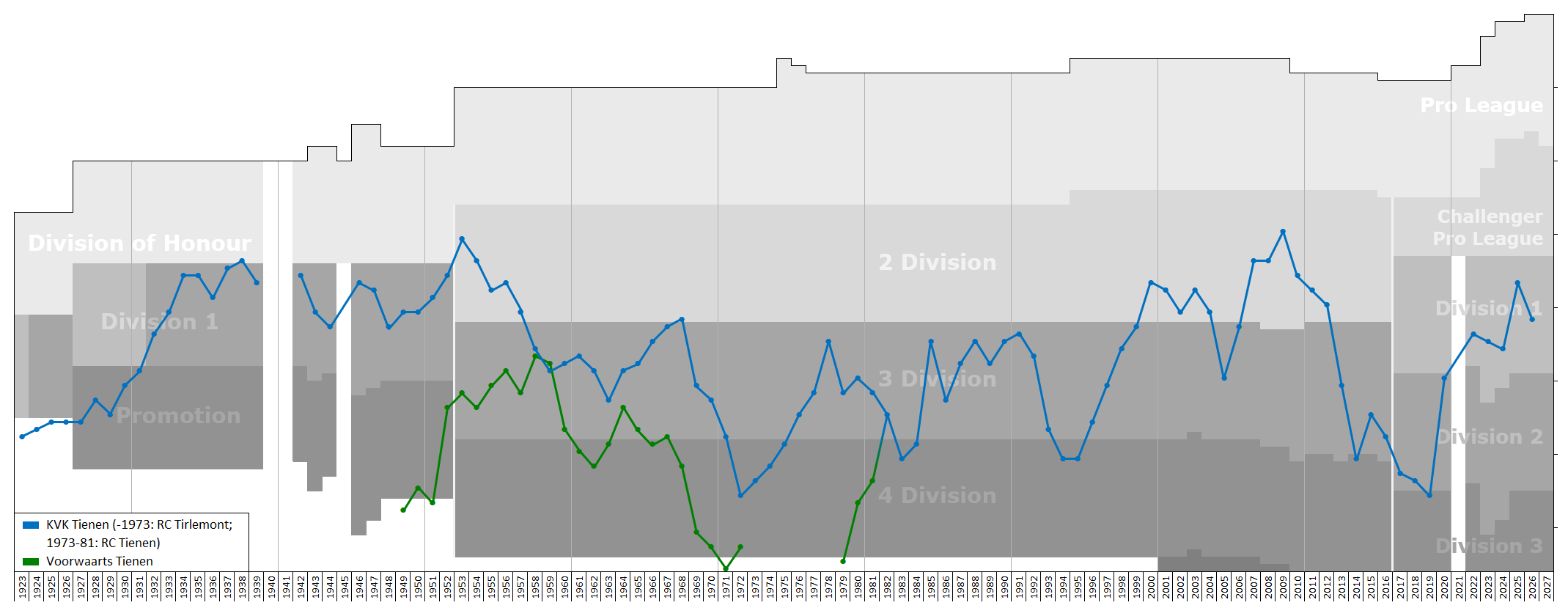
Historical chart of KVK Tienen league performance

In 1951 the club was renamed as R.R.C. Tirlemont. Between 1957 and 1967 Tirlemont spent 10 seasons at lower levels and played one more season in the second division in 1967–68 finishing last. In 1973 there was a new name change to R.R.C. Tienen.

Eight years later Matricule 132 merged with the Voorwaarts Tienen to become K.V.K. Tienen. The KVK accessed to the second division in 1999. In spite of a 17th place (on 18) in 2002 the club remained in the second division for two more seasons as K.R.C. Zuid-West-Vlaanderen was refused its license. In 2004 the 17th place at which Tienen finished the championship caused it to be relegated to the third division.

In 2006, KVK Tienen promoted back to the Belgian second division but was relegated six years later. Nicky Hayen is currently coach for team. In 2013 the club declared bankruptcy and had to be refounded. In doing so they changed their name to KVK Tienen-Hageland, nevertheless they were demoted by the Belgian FA to the fourth division where it won its group to earn promotion back to the third tier after a season away.

== Current squad ==
As of 6 April, 2026

Note: Flags indicate national team as defined under FIFA eligibility rules; some limited exceptions apply. Players may hold more than one non-FIFA nationality.

No.	Pos.	Nation	Player
1	GK	BEL	Ilias Moutha-Sebtaoui
2	DF	BEL	Noé Rottiers
3	DF	BEL	Matisse Bergiers
4	DF	BEL	Ferre Maho
5	DF	BEL	Seth Vandevelde
6	MF	BEL	Senne Ceulemans
7	FW	FRA	Diafa Soumah
8	MF	BEL	Adrien Marchal
9	FW	BEL	Tom Panepinto
10	FW	GER	Ephraim Eshele
13	DF	ENG	Amardeep Singh
15	FW	BEL	Aeron Mbenzu

No.	Pos.	Nation	Player
16	DF	BEL	Jason Kaluanga
17	MF	BEL	Ryan Lenoir
18	MF	BEL	Robby Wakaka
19	FW	NIG	Abdoul Boulhassane
22	MF	BEL	Ayoub El Harrak
23	MF	BEL	Pieter-Jan Smets
24	DF	BEL	Kobe Vande Cauter
27	DF	BEL	Mehdi El Ghraichi
29	MF	BEL	Luca Napoleone
47	FW	BEL	Elaïjah Stalmans
96	GK	BEL	Nicholas Rutgeerts
