= Jordy Peffer =

Belgian footballer (born 1996)

Personal information
- Date of birth: 4 November 1996 (age 30)
- Place of birth: Duffel, Belgium
- Height: 1.83 m (6 ft 0 in)
- Position: Forward

Team information
- Current team: Lyra-Lierse
- Number: 77

Youth career
- KSK Wavria
- –2012: Anderlecht
- 2012–2015: KV Mechelen

Senior career*
Years	Team	Apps	(Gls)
2015–2019	KV Mechelen	1	(0)
2017–2018	→ KVC Westerlo (loan)	18	(0)
2018–2019	→ Dessel Sport (loan)	13	(0)
2019	→ Lyra-Lierse (loan)	10	(8)
2019–	Lyra-Lierse	172	(123)
- * Club domestic league appearances and goals as of 15:47, 27 May 2026 (UTC)

Jordy Peffer (born 4 November 1996) is a Belgian footballer who plays as a forward for Belgian Division 1 club Lyra-Lierse.

== Career ==
=== Mechelen ===
Peffer started his senior career with KV Mechelen in the Belgian First Division A. He made his competitive debut for the club on 4 March 2017 in a 3–2 home victory over Anderlecht, coming on as a 76th-minute substitute for Christian Osaguona. He scored his first competitive goal for the club on 16 May 2017 in a home 1–0 victory in the Belgian Europa League playoffs against Royale Union Saint-Gilloise. His goal, scored in the 37th minute, was the only goal of the game. In a 4–2 friendly against Luxembourg, he came on as a substitute and scored a goal. In June 2017, he signed a two-year contract extension with the club.

=== Westerlo (loan) ===
In June 2017, Peffer was loaned out to Belgian First Division B club K.V.C. Westerlo. He made his competitive debut for the club on 11 November 2017 in a 1–0 home defeat to Royale Union Saint-Gilloise, coming on as an 82nd-minute substitute for Daan Heymans.

=== Dessel Sport (loan) ===
In August 2018, Peffer was loaned out to Belgian First Amateur Division club Dessel. He made his competitive debut for the club on 24 August 2018 in a 3–1 home victory over Oud-Heverlee Leuven in the Belgian Cup, coming on as a substitute for Kevin Janssens in the 86th minute.

=== Lyra-Lierse ===
On 1 February 2019, Peffer was loaned out to Lyra-Lierse for the rest of the season. The club then announced on 10 May 2019, that they had signed the player permanently and signed a two-year contract with him from the upcoming season.

On 1 March 2024, Peffer signed a three-year contract extension with Lyra, committing his future to the club until 2027. By that time, he had amassed 112 goals in 145 appearances for the club.
