= Hoogstraten VV =

Belgian football club

- Full name: Hoogstraten Voetbalvereniging
- Nickname: De Rooikens (The Reds)
- Founded: 1936; 90 years ago
- Ground: Sportcomplex Seminarie, Hoogstraten
- Capacity: 5,000
- Chairman: Jan Michoel
- Manager: Frank Belmans
- League: Belgian National Division 1
- 2023–24: Belgian National Division 1, 8th of 18
- Website: http://www.hoogstratenvv.be/
Home colours	Away colours

Hoogstraten VV (Dutch: Hoogstraten Voetbalvereniging) is a Belgian football club from Hoogstraten, Antwerp. It was founded in 1936 and has red and white team colors. The club currently play in Belgian National Division 1, the third tier of Belgian football.

In 1964 Hoogstraten was promoted from the provincial leagues for the first time into the Belgian Promotion, followed by another promotion into the Belgian Third Division in 1986. The team stayed at the third level until 2002 when they dropped again to the fourth level. After promotions in 2008 and 2013, the team played at the highest level in its existence, the Belgian Second Division, from the 2013–14 season.

== Current squad ==
As of 6 April, 2026

Note: Flags indicate national team as defined under FIFA eligibility rules; some limited exceptions apply. Players may hold more than one non-FIFA nationality.

No.	Pos.	Nation	Player
1	GK	NED	Aron van Lare
2	DF	NED	Stef de Wijs
3	DF	BEL	Arne Cassaert
4	DF	BEL	Senne Van Dooren
6	DF	BEL	Jouk Vermeeren
7	FW	BEL	Endrit Voca
8	MF	BEL	Niels Van De Vel
10	MF	NED	Mehdi Naqqadi
11	FW	BEL	Jonathan Mfumu
13	MF	NED	Damian de Troije

No.	Pos.	Nation	Player
14	FW	NED	Timo Regouin
15	DF	BEL	Stan Bellens
16	MF	BEL	Nick Havermans
17	MF	BEL	Vic D'Haeyer
19	FW	BEL	Lex Predhomme
20	GK	BEL	Milan De Schutter
21	DF	BEL	Ruben Verheyen
22	MF	ESP	Axel Asumu
23	DF	BEL	Lenn Van Gestel
24	DF	BEL	Jeroen Meeuwis
39	MF	BEL	Yannis Augustijnen
