= Lommel SK =

Belgian football club

Lommel
- Full name: Lommel Sportkring
- Founded: 1932; 94 years ago
- Ground: Soevereinstadion, Lommel
- Capacity: 8,000
- Owner(s): City Football Group (99%); Others (1%)
- Chairman: Harm van Veldhoven
- Head coach: Lee Johnson
- League: Belgian Pro League
- 2025–26: Challenger Pro League, 5th of 17 (promoted via play-offs)
- Website: www.lommelsk.be
Home colours	Away colours

Lommel SK is a Belgian association football club based in the city of Lommel, Limburg. They currently play in the Belgian Pro League, following promotion from the Challenger Pro League in the 2025–26 season.

== History ==
=== Formation ===
The roots of the club date back to the 1920s when the club Vlug & Vrij Overpelt-Usines (Fast & Free Overpelt-Factories) was founded, registering as an official club with the Royal Belgian Football Association in 1927 to receive matricule 1064. The club dissolved in 1933 only to be re-established in 1937 as Vlug & Vrij Overpelt (Fast & Free Overpelt) with matricule 2554 and played at stadium De Leukens in Overpelt. It was commonly known as Overpelt Fabriek (Overpelt Factory), named after the Overpelt district in which the zinc factory was situated and was a club for the local factory workers.

=== Late 20th Century ===
In 1954, the club reached the national football levels, that time at the fourth level of the Belgian football pyramid, and continued to the Belgian Third Division in 1957. Near the end of the 1950s, the name was changed again, now to Vlug en Vrij Overpelt-Fabriek (Fast and Free Overpelt-Factory).

In 1982, the club was promoted to the Belgian Second Division where it remained for three seasons before being relegated again and starting an up and down movement between the second and fourth divisions. In 1987 the club obtained the royal designation, thus changing the name in 1988 to Koninklijke Vlug en Vrij Overpelt-Fabriek (Royal Fast and Free Overpelt-Factory). Midway the 1990s the club played three more seasons in the second division but promotion to the highest level would never be obtained.

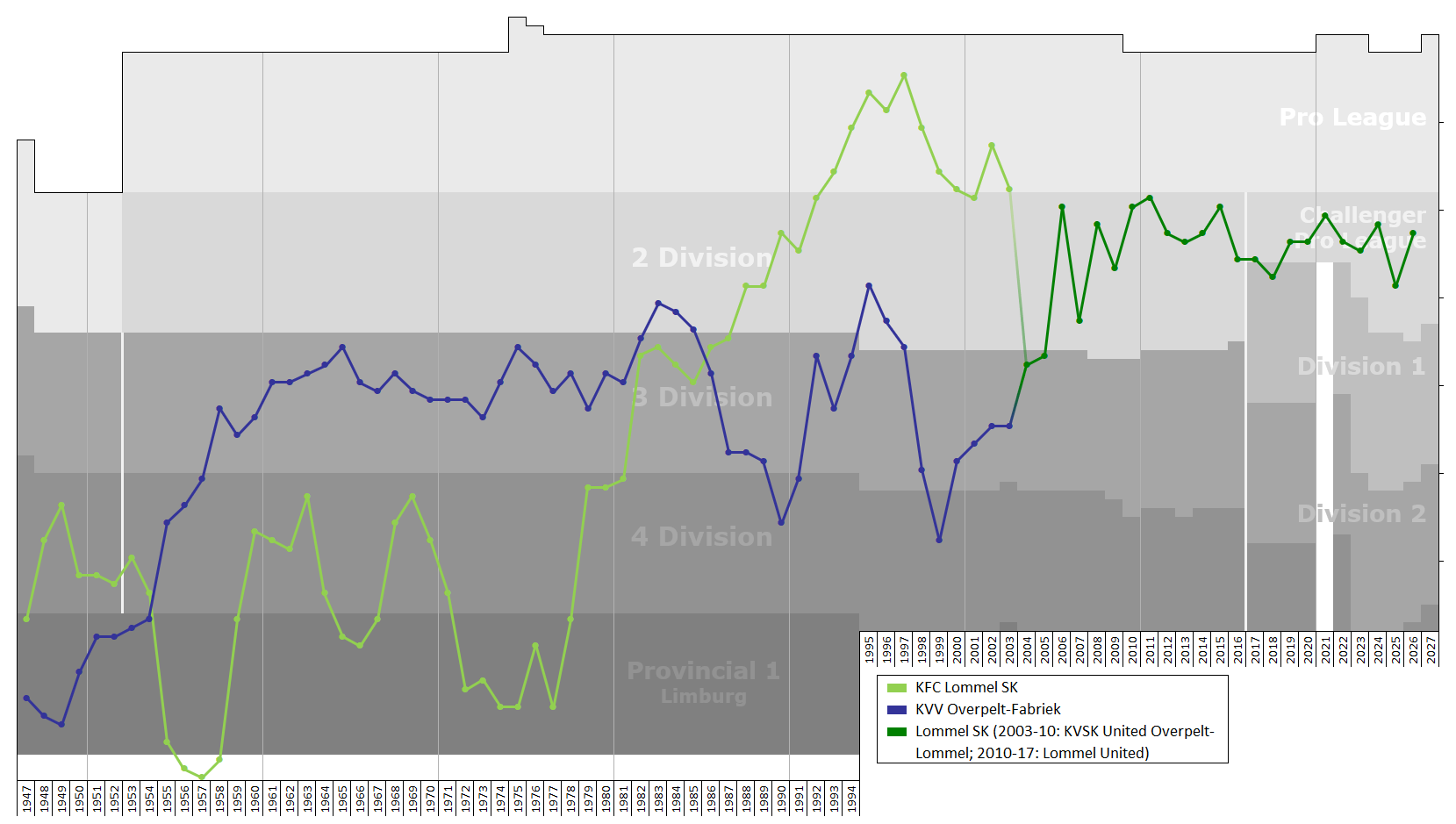
Historical league performance chart of Lommel SK and its predecessors

=== Early 21st Century ===
In 2003, neighbours KFC Lommel SK dissolved following bankruptcy. Lommel had been founded in 1932 and its biggest achievements included playing the 2001 Belgian Cup Final and playing in both the 1997 and 1998 UEFA Intertoto Cup. Overpelt-Fabriek and Lommel merged into KVSK United Overpelt-Lommel, often referred to as KVSK United, with KVSK an abbreviation standing for Koninklijke Voetbalvereniging en Sportkring (Royal Footballassociation and Sportscircle). It continued with the matricule 2554 of Overpelt-Fabriek but moved from De Leukens to the Soevereinstadion in Lommel. The club colours became a combination of those of Lommel (green & white) and Overpelt-Fabriek (red & blue). The new club started the 2003–04 season in the third division and only narrowly missed out on promotion. The following season the team became champions undefeated throughout the whole season (30 matches) and was promoted to the second division. During the 2005–06 season the team came close to promotion to the highest level as it led the table before the last match but lost away to Oud-Heverlee Leuven and saw the title and promotion move to Mons. The following promotion playoffs were lost to Lierse.

In 2010, the club merged with third division team KFC Racing Mol-Wezel and changed its name to Lommel United and started two very successful seasons, ending second in both 2009–10 and 2010–11. This however was a turning point, as almost all starting players decided to leave the club after those two seasons, forcing Lommel United to rebuild the team with many youngsters. A highlight was the 2014–15 season in which Lommel United again finished second. After that, the team only narrowly managed to obtain a place in the new second-level league called Belgian First Division B, but during the 2016–17 season the team started with only 3 wins out of 28 matches and despite a strong finish, the team was relegated to the Belgian First Amateur Division, thereby losing its professional status. Following that season, the team changed its name to Lommel SK.

In May 2020, it was announced that City Football Group, a subsidiary of Abu Dhabi United Group, had purchased Lommel SK, making it the ninth club to join their stable.

Lommel returned to the top flight after 23-years absence, they gained promotion to the 2026–27 Belgian Pro League, following winning the play-off final against Dender EH.

== Current squad ==
As of 6 September 2026

Note: Flags indicate national team as defined under FIFA eligibility rules; some limited exceptions apply. Players may hold more than one non-FIFA nationality.

No.	Pos.	Nation	Player
1	GK	MNE	Nikola Ivezić
2	FW	NED	Jason van Duiven
3	DF	ENG	Timothy Eyoma
4	DF	BEL	Shawn Adewoye
5	DF	BEL	Dries Wouters
6	MF	IDN	Joey Pelupessy
7	FW	FIN	Juho Talvitie
8	MF	BEL	Nicolas Rommens
9	FW	NED	Don-Angelo Konadu (on loan from Ajax)
10	FW	BEL	Tom Reyners
11	FW	FRA	Stredair Appuah (on loan from Palermo)
12	FW	NGR	Elijah Odede (on loan from Troyes)
13	DF	COL	Jhon Banguera
14	DF	SWE	Jesper Tolinsson
15	MF	BEL	Lucas Schoofs (captain)

No.	Pos.	Nation	Player
17	DF	BEL	Emile Vandecraen
22	MF	SRB	Đorđe Gordić
23	GK	BEL	Matthias Pieklak
25	DF	BEL	Josias Lama
30	FW	NED	Ralf Seuntjens
33	GK	BEL	Rik Vercauteren
34	DF	GHA	Henry Oware
41	MF	NOR	Sverre Nypan (on loan from Manchester City)
44	MF	ENG	Isaiah Dada-Mascoll (on loan from Manchester City)
46	FW	BEL	Niek Corthouts
47	DF	NED	Tristan Gooijer
60	FW	BEL	Lars Beirinckx
73	FW	BEL	Alexander Reumers
79	DF	NED	Sam de Grand (on loan from AZ Alkmaar)

=== Out on loan ===
Note: Flags indicate national team as defined under FIFA eligibility rules; some limited exceptions apply. Players may hold more than one non-FIFA nationality.

No.	Pos.	Nation	Player
—	MF	BUL	Filip Krastev (at PEC Zwolle until 30 June 2027)
—	MF	BEL	Théo Mununga (at Royal Knokke FC until 30 June 2027)

No.	Pos.	Nation	Player
—	FW	COL	John Montaño (at Independiente Medellín until 31 December 2026)
—	FW	NOR	Faniel Tewelde (at Odd until 31 December 2026)

== Coaching staff ==
Position	Name
President	(Netherlands) Harm Van Veldhoven
CEO	(England) Mike Green
Sporting Director	(England) James McCarron
Head coach	(England) Lee Johnson
Assistant coach	(England) Mat Sadler
Goalkeeper coach	(Belgium) Kristof Van Hout
Head of Science and Medicine	(Netherlands) Sjoerd Den Dekker
Head of Team & Player Development	(Belgium) David Gibas
Sports Scientist	(Belgium) Stefan Winters
Team Manager	(Belgium) Carla Mota-Sanchez

Clubs owned by CFG Listed in order of acquisition/foundation. Bold indicates the club was founded by CFG. * indicates the club was acquired by CFG. § indicates the club is co-owned. † indicates the club is no longer owned by CFG.
2008	(England) Manchester City*
2009–2012
2013	(United States) **New York City FC**^{§}
2014	(Australia) Melbourne City*
2014	(Japan) Yokohama F. Marinos*^{†}
2015–2016
2017	(Uruguay) Montevideo City*
2017	(Spain) Girona*^{§}
2018
2019	(China) Shenzhen Peng City*^{§}
2019	(India) Mumbai City^{†}
2020	(Belgium) Lommel*
2020	(France) Troyes*
2021
2022	(Italy) Palermo*^{§}
2023	(Brazil) Bahia*^{§}
