= KVV Zelzate =

Association football club in Merelbeke, Belgium

- Full name: Koninklijke Voetbalvereniging Zelzate
- Short name: Zelzate
- Founded: 1922; 104 years ago 2008; 18 years ago (merger)
- Ground: Armand Seghers Complex, Zelzate
- Chairman: Stefaan Luca
- Head coach: Ian De Maesschalck (caretaker)
- League: Belgian National Division 1
- 2024–25: Division 2 VV A, 3rd of 16 (promoted)
- Website: https://www.kvv-zelzate.be/
Home colours	Away colours

KVV Zelzate is a Belgian football club based in the commune of Zelzate, registered with the Belgian FA under matricule 4165. The full name of the club is Koninklijke Voetbalvereniging Zelzate (Royal Football Association Zelzate), and it has green and white as club colours. As of the 2025–26 season, the club plays in Belgian Division 1.

== History ==
KVV Zelzate was created in 2008, when KSLV Zelzate and KFC Zelzate merged. Legally, it is the successor of KSLV Zelzate as the new club continued with its matricule number 4165, while the matricule number of KFC Zelzate (4386) was deleted.

KSLV Zelzate (full name: Koninklijke Sint-Laurens Voetbalclub Zelzate. English: Royal Sint-Laurens Football Club Zelzate) was founded on 26 December 1922, but only started playing matches in September 1923 as part of the Diocesan Sports Association, using the Catholic colours of yellow and white. From 1926, it joined the Catholic Sports Association as KVV Zelzate (full name: Katholieke Vlaamse Voetbalvereniging Zelzate. English: Catholic Flemish Football Association Zelzate), before changing its name again in 1937 to Sint-Laurens Voetbalclub Zelzate, the name referring to friar Eucherius of the Sint-Laurensinstitute. At that point, the club colours were changed to green and white, which are the colours of the commune of Zelzate. Only in 1945 did the club join the Belgian FA and was assigned matricule 4165. Their most famous player would turn out to be goalkeeper Armand Seghers, as he was sold to La Gantoise in 1949 and would later become a Belgian international. SLV Zelzate played several seasons at the highest provincial level (1948–1950, 1952–1957, and 1964–1966), but was never able to make it into the national levels, their highest finish being the runner-up position in the 1952–53 season. In the 1970s, the club first dropped to the third provincial level and in 1979 even sank to the fourth (and lowest) level in Belgium. In the 1980s, the club was able to climb up a bit, and the club took its final name, KSLV Zelzate, in 1995 upon becoming Royal after 50 years of registration with the Belgian FA. The club went up and down and played in the second, third, and fourth provincial levels in the years after that.

KFC Zelzate was founded in 1933 as VC Blue-Boys, joining the Belgian FA in 1946 under matricule 4386. The club remained at the third provincial level until 1968–69, when it dropped to the newly created fourth level. They immediately promoted back and even reached the second provincial level in 1977, where they would play two seasons. In 1998, the club dropped again to the fourth level, after which it would climb up one level again to remain at the third provincial level until the merger in 2008.

The new club started in the second provincial level in 2008. In 2011, they became champions and were promoted to the first provincial level, where they lost the promotion playoffs to the national level on three occasions, in 2014, 2016, and 2017, before finally succeeding through winning the title in 2018 and moving up to the Belgian Division 3 (then named Third Amateur Division). In 2020, the club was promoted to the Belgian Division 2. In 2022 and 2025, the club lost the promotion playoffs, but due to a league reform in 2025, an extra spot opened up, and KVV Zelzate was promoted to the Belgian Division 1, the third level of Belgian football.

== Current squad ==
As of 5 February 2026

Note: Flags indicate national team as defined under FIFA eligibility rules; some limited exceptions apply. Players may hold more than one non-FIFA nationality.

No.	Pos.	Nation	Player
1	GK	BEL	Jasper Baeyens
2	FW	BEL	Kelvin Debra
3	DF	BEL	Ilias El Hamdaoui
4	DF	BEL	Bastien Yondjouen
6	DF	BEL	Søren Coens
7	FW	BEL	Zenz Raaymakers
8	DF	BEL	Brendan Schoonbaert
10	MF	BEL	Visar Shala
11	FW	BEL	Abdoul Camara
11	GK	BEL	Bakary Pede
13	MF	EGY	Naïm Abou Bakr
14	MF	BEL	Maxime De Smet
21	MF	BEL	Ilias Mjahed
23	FW	BEL	Quinten Boudry

No.	Pos.	Nation	Player
31	DF	BEL	Remco Horbach
33	DF	BEL	Stéphane Chirishungu
34	MF	BEL	Benjamin Melkebeke
35	DF	BEL	Lennert Hallaert
44	FW	BEL	Jilke De Coninck
47	MF	BEL	Jef De Block
55	FW	BEL	Wolf Ackx
67	MF	BEL	Aydin Capa
70	GK	BEL	Maarten Willems
73	FW	BEL	Milan Beck
77	FW	BEL	Dario Beresole
81	GK	BEL	Darko Van Rie
—	GK	BEL	Gilles Smits
—	FW	BEL	Ilias Toumi

== Honours ==
- Belgian Division 2
  - Third place (1): 2024–25
- Belgian Division 3
  - Winner (1): 2019–20
- First Provincial League East Flanders
  - Winner (1): 2017–18
