= 2018–19 in Belgian football =

Football in Belgium
- Season: 2018–19

Men's football
- First Division A: Genk
- First Division B: Mechelen
- First Amateur Division: Virton
- Second Amateur Division: Sint-Eloois-Winkel (A), Patro Eisden Maasmechelen (B) and La Louvière Centre (C)
- Third Amateur Division: Merelbeke (A), Tienen (B), Namur Fosses (C) and Stockay (D)
- Cup: Mechelen
- Super Cup: Club Brugge

The following article is a summary of the 2018–19 football season in Belgium, which is the 116th season of competitive football in the country and runs from July 2018 until June 2019.

== National teams ==
=== Belgium national football team ===
Following the success at the 2018 FIFA World Cup, Belgium was expected to perform well in the inaugural UEFA Nations League competition but collapsed in their final match against Switzerland, losing 5–2 despite a 0–2 lead, to miss out on the Nations League Finals. The UEFA Euro 2020 qualifying Group I campaign was however started with four straight wins.

==== 2018–19 UEFA Nations League A ====
===== Group 3 =====
Pos	Team	Pld	W	D	L	GF	GA	GD	Pts	Qualification (Note: Due to revamp of the format for the 2020–21 UEFA Nations League, no teams were eventually relegated.)	(Switzerland)	(Belgium)	(Iceland)
1	Switzerland	4	3	0	1	14	5	+9	9 (Note: Head-to-head goal difference: Switzerland +2, Belgium −2.)	Qualification for Nations League Finals	—	5–2	6–0
2	Belgium	4	3	0	1	9	6	+3	9		2–1	—	2–0
3	Iceland	4	0	0	4	1	13	−12	0		1–2	0–3	—

Source: UEFA
Rules for classification: Tiebreakers
Notes:

11 September 2018	Iceland	0–3	Belgium	Laugardalsvöllur, Reykjavík
20:45 (18:45 UTC+0)		Report	E. Hazard 29' (pen.); Lukaku 31', 81'	Attendance: 9,710; Referee: Sergei Karasev (Russia)

12 October 2018	Belgium	2–1	Switzerland	King Baudouin Stadium, Brussels
20:45	Lukaku 58', 84'	Report	Gavranović 76'	Attendance: 39,049; Referee: Antonio Mateu Lahoz (Spain)

15 November 2018	Belgium	2–0	Iceland	King Baudouin Stadium, Brussels
20:45	Batshuayi 65', 81'	Report		Attendance: 28,891; Referee: Orel Grinfeld (Israel)

18 November 2018	Switzerland	5–2	Belgium	Swissporarena, Lucerne
20:45	Rodríguez 26' (pen.); Seferovic 31', 44', 84'; Elvedi 62'	Report	T. Hazard 2', 17'	Attendance: 15,000; Referee: Daniele Orsato (Italy)

==== UEFA Euro 2020 qualifying ====
Pos	Team	Pld	W	D	L	GF	GA	GD	Pts	Qualification	(Belgium)	(Russia)	(Scotland)	(Cyprus)	(Kazakhstan)	(San Marino)
1	Belgium	10	10	0	0	40	3	+37	30	Qualify for final tournament	—	3–1	3–0	6–1	3–0	9–0
2	Russia	10	8	0	2	33	8	+25	24	Qualify for final tournament	1–4	—	4–0	1–0	1–0	9–0
3	Scotland	10	5	0	5	16	19	−3	15	Advance to play-offs via Nations League	0–4	1–2	—	2–1	3–1	6–0
4	Cyprus	10	3	1	6	15	20	−5	10 (Note: Head-to-head points: Cyprus 4, Kazakhstan 1.)		0–2	0–5	1–2	—	1–1	5–0
5	Kazakhstan	10	3	1	6	13	17	−4	10		0–2	0–4	3–0	1–2	—	4–0
6	San Marino	10	0	0	10	1	51	−50	0		0–4	0–5	0–2	0–4	1–3	—

Source: UEFA
Rules for classification: Qualification tiebreakers
Notes:

21 March 2019	Belgium	3–1	Russia	King Baudouin Stadium, Brussels
20:45	Tielemans 14'; E. Hazard 45' (pen.), 88'	Report	Cheryshev 16'	Attendance: 34,245; Referee: Ovidiu Hațegan (Romania)

24 March 2019	Cyprus	0–2	Belgium	GSP Stadium, Nicosia
20:45 (21:45 UTC+2)		Report	E. Hazard 10'; Batshuayi 18'	Attendance: 8,728; Referee: François Letexier (France)

8 June 2019	Belgium	3–0	Kazakhstan	King Baudouin Stadium, Brussels
20:45	Mertens 11'; Castagne 14'; Lukaku 50'	Report		Referee: Irfan Peljto (Bosnia and Herzegovina)

11 June 2019	Belgium	3–0	Scotland	King Baudouin Stadium, Brussels
20:45	Lukaku 45+1', 57'; De Bruyne 90+2'	Report		Referee: Petr Ardeleanu (Czech Republic)

==== Friendlies ====
7 September 2018 Friendly	Scotland	0–4	Belgium	Glasgow, Scotland
20:45 (19:45 UTC+1)		Report	R. Lukaku 28'; E. Hazard 46'; Batshuayi 52', 60'	Stadium: Hampden Park; Attendance: 20,196; Referee: Luca Banti (Italy)

16 October 2018 Friendly	Belgium	1–1	Netherlands	Brussels, Belgium
20:45 (20:45 UTC+2)	Mertens 5'	Report	Groeneveld 27'	Stadium: King Baudouin Stadium; Referee: Artur Soares Dias (Portugal)

== Men's football ==
=== League season ===
==== Promotion and relegation ====
The following teams had achieved promotion or suffered relegation going into the 2018–19 season.

League	Promoted to league	Relegated from league
First Division A	Cercle Brugge	KV Mechelen
First Division B	Lommel SK	none (due to bankruptcy of Lierse)
First Division Amateur Division	RFC Liège; Rupel Boom; RWDM47; Tessenderlo	Berchem Sport; Hamme; Patro Eisden Maasmechelen
Second Division Amateur Division	Couvin-Mariembourg; Diegem; Dikkelvenne; Eppegem; Francs Borains; Heur-Tongeren; La Louvière; Menen; Tilleur; Visé	Bornem; La Calamine; Pepingen-Halle; Sint-Lenaarts; Sprimont Comblain; Tienen; Torhout; WS Brussels; Zwarte Leeuw
Third Division Amateur Division	Betekom; Condruzien; CS Braine; Fosses; Jette; Lyra-Lierse Berlaar; Helson Helchteren; Meix-Dt-Virton; Oostkamp; Oppagne-Wéris; Ostiches-Ath; Racing Mechelen; Stockel; Symphorinois; Warnant; Zelzate; Zwevezele	Bertrix; Cointe-Liège; Diest; Grimbergen; Habay; Herentals; Hoeilaart; Mariekerke; Ninove; Solre; Spy; Sterrebeek; Vlamertinge; Waterloo

==== Belgian First Division A ====
===== Regular season =====
Pos	Team	Pld	W	D	L	GF	GA	GD	Pts	Qualification or relegation
1	Genk	30	18	9	3	63	31	+32	63	Qualification for the championship play-offs
2	Club Brugge	30	16	8	6	64	32	+32	56	Qualification for the championship play-offs
3	Standard Liège	30	15	8	7	49	35	+14	53	Qualification for the championship play-offs
4	Anderlecht	30	15	6	9	49	34	+15	51	Qualification for the championship play-offs
5	Gent	30	15	5	10	53	45	+8	50	Qualification for the championship play-offs
6	Antwerp	30	14	7	9	39	34	+5	49	Qualification for the championship play-offs
7	Sint-Truiden	30	12	11	7	47	36	+11	47	Qualification for the Europa League play-offs
8	Kortrijk	30	12	7	11	44	42	+2	43	Qualification for the Europa League play-offs
9	Charleroi	30	12	6	12	43	43	0	42	Qualification for the Europa League play-offs
10	Excel Mouscron	30	11	7	12	33	33	0	40	Qualification for the Europa League play-offs
11	Zulte Waregem	30	8	9	13	49	60	−11	33	Qualification for the Europa League play-offs
12	Eupen	30	10	2	18	34	57	−23	32	Qualification for the Europa League play-offs
13	Cercle Brugge	30	7	7	16	35	59	−24	28	Qualification for the Europa League play-offs
14	Oostende	30	6	9	15	29	52	−23	27	Qualification for the Europa League play-offs
15	Waasland-Beveren	30	5	12	13	37	50	−13	27	Qualification for the Europa League play-offs
16	Lokeren (R)	30	5	5	20	28	53	−25	20	Relegation to First Division B

Source: Belgian First Division A (in Dutch), Soccerway
Rules for classification: 1) Points; 2) Matches won; 3) Goal difference; 4) Goals scored; 5) Away goals scored; 6) Away matches won; 7) Play-off.
(R) Relegated

===== Championship play-offs =====
Pos	Team	Pld	W	D	L	GF	GA	GD	Pts	Qualification	GNK	CLU	STA	ANT	GNT	AND
1	Genk (C)	10	6	2	2	19	8	+11	52	Qualification for the Champions League group stage	—	3–1	0–0	4–0	2–1	3–0
2	Club Brugge	10	7	1	2	19	11	+8	50	Qualification for the Champions League third qualifying round	3–2	—	4–0	3–2	3–0	1–0
3	Standard Liège	10	4	1	5	17	16	+1	40	Qualification for the Europa League group stage	1–3	2–0	—	3–1	2–3	5–0 FF (Note: Match was abandoned near the end of the first half as Anderlecht supporters had been throwing flares and smoke bombs on the pitch. At that time Standard was leading 2–0. A few weeks later Anderlecht was fined 5.000 Euro and forced to play one match behind closed doors, with the match result set to a 5–0 win for Standard.)
4	Antwerp (O)	10	4	2	4	12	16	−4	39	Qualification for the Europa League play-off Final	1–0	0–0	2–1	—	1–2	1–1
5	Gent	10	3	1	6	10	15	−5	35	Qualification for the Europa League second qualifying round	0–1	0–1	1–2	1–2	—	2–1
6	Anderlecht	10	1	3	6	8	19	−11	32		1–1	2–3	2–1	1–2	0–0	—

Source: Sport.be
Rules for classification: 1) Points; 2) Points without (possible) half points added due to rounding; 3) Position obtained during the Regular season
(C) Champions; (O) Play-off winners

==== Belgian First Division B ====
Pos	Team	Pld	W	D	L	GF	GA	GD	Pts	Qualification
1	Mechelen	28	17	8	3	55	25	+30	59	Qualification to Promotion play-offs (Note: The team that promotes to the 2019–20 Belgian First Division A, either by winning the promotion playoff or by winning both the opening and the closing tournament, will not take part in the Europa League play-offs. The next team in the league will take its spot instead.)
2	Beerschot Wilrijk	28	15	9	4	48	33	+15	54	Qualification to Promotion play-offs
3	Union SG	28	13	6	9	41	29	+12	45	Qualification to Europa League play-offs
4	Westerlo	28	9	7	12	28	37	−9	34	Qualification to Europa League play-offs
5	Roeselare	28	8	9	11	33	41	−8	33	Qualification to Relegation play-offs (Note: In case the team that wins the promotion playoff finishes in the bottom four, the 4th placed team will play the relegation playoff instead.)
6	Lommel	28	8	7	13	34	46	−12	31	Qualification to Relegation play-offs
7	OH Leuven	28	8	5	15	40	48	−8	29	Qualification to Relegation play-offs
8	Tubize	28	6	5	17	28	48	−20	23	Qualification to Relegation play-offs

Source: Belgian First Division B (in French and Dutch)
Rules for classification: 1) Points; 2) Matches won; 3) Goal difference; 4) Goals scored; 5) Away goals scored; 6) Away matches won; 7) Play-off.

==== Belgian First Amateur Division ====
Pos	Team	Pld	W	D	L	GF	GA	GD	Pts	Qualification or relegation
1	Tessenderlo	30	19	5	6	62	28	+34	62	Qualification for the promotion play-offs
2	Deinze	30	17	8	5	53	30	+23	59	Qualification for the promotion play-offs
3	Virton	30	15	9	6	42	20	+22	54	Qualification for the promotion play-offs
4	Lierse Kempenzonen	30	13	9	8	42	36	+6	48	Qualification for the promotion play-offs
5	Rupel Boom	30	13	6	11	44	40	+4	45	
6	RFC Liège	30	11	8	11	41	35	+6	41	
7	Seraing	30	10	11	9	46	40	+6	41	
8	RWDM47	30	11	7	12	39	45	−6	40	
9	Dender EH	30	10	10	10	42	40	+2	40	
10	Heist	30	10	8	12	29	44	−15	38	
11	Châtelet (Note: After the season, Châtelet merged with Olympic Charleroi to become Olympic Charleroi Châtelet Farciennes, officially a continuation of Olympic Charleroi which will take the place of Châtelet in the 2019–20 Belgian First Amateur Division, while the team of Châtelet ceased to exist.)	30	9	9	12	30	37	−7	36	
12	Dessel	30	9	8	13	30	39	−9	35	
13	Oudenaarde (R)	30	10	4	16	37	59	−22	34	Qualification for the Second Amateur Division Promotion play-offs Final
14	ASV Geel (R)	30	9	4	17	42	62	−20	31	Relegation to the Second Amateur Division
15	Aalst (R)	30	7	10	13	35	49	−14	31	Relegation to the Second Amateur Division
16	Knokke (R)	30	6	6	18	35	45	−10	24	Relegation to the Second Amateur Division

Updated to match(es) played on completed. Source: Soccerway
Rules for classification: 1) Points; 2) Matches won; 3) Goal difference; 4) Goals scored; 5) Away goals scored; 6) Away matches won.
(R) Relegated

==== Belgian Second Amateur Division ====
===== Division A =====
Pos	Team	Pld	W	D	L	GF	GA	GD	Pts	Qualification or relegation
1	Sint-Eloois-Winkel (C, P)	30	22	3	5	60	24	+36	69	Promotion to the 2019–20 Belgian First Amateur Division
2	Mandel United	30	19	3	8	58	30	+28	60	Qualification for the Promotion play-offs VFV (Note: Only clubs which had received a licence to play in the 2019–20 Belgian First Amateur Division were allowed to take part in the promotion playoffs. As a result, Petegem was replaced by the highest finisher not already qualified: Ronse.)
3	Petegem	30	13	10	7	55	44	+11	49	
4	Gent-Zeehaven	30	14	6	10	56	39	+17	48	Qualification for the Promotion play-offs VFV
5	Wijgmaal	30	13	8	9	52	46	+6	47	Qualification for the Promotion play-offs VFV
6	Ronse	30	12	7	11	41	35	+6	43	Qualification for the Promotion play-offs VFV
7	Menen	30	12	6	12	51	56	−5	42	
8	Londerzeel	30	11	7	12	37	35	+2	40	
9	Diegem	30	11	6	13	37	51	−14	39	
10	Westhoek	30	12	1	17	48	56	−8	37	
11	Dikkelvenne	30	10	6	14	36	66	−30	36	
12	Harelbeke	30	9	8	13	37	38	−1	35	
13	Gullegem	30	9	8	13	40	52	−12	35	
14	Eppegem (R)	30	10	4	16	36	66	−30	34	Qualification for the relegation play-offs
15	Overijse (R)	30	8	5	17	36	50	−14	29	Relegation to the 2019–20 Belgian Third Amateur Division
16	Brakel (R)	30	6	10	14	39	47	−8	28	Relegation to the 2019–20 Belgian Third Amateur Division

Source: vbal4
Rules for classification: 1) Points; 2) Goal difference; 3) Goals scored.
(C) Champions; (P) Promoted; (R) Relegated

===== Division B =====
Pos	Team	Pld	W	D	L	GF	GA	GD	Pts	Qualification or relegation
1	Patro Eisden Maasmechelen (C, P)	30	19	9	2	59	26	+33	66	Promotion to the 2019–20 Belgian First Amateur Division
2	Hasselt	30	18	6	6	53	29	+24	60	Qualification for the Promotion play-offs VFV
3	Temse	30	15	6	9	60	48	+12	51	
4	Bocholt	30	15	4	11	54	38	+16	49	Qualification for the Promotion play-offs VFV
5	Berchem	30	12	7	11	54	49	+5	43	
6	Hades	30	10	13	7	50	40	+10	43	
7	Cappellen	30	11	8	11	41	41	0	41	
8	Duffel	30	10	11	9	47	40	+7	41	
9	Sint-Niklaas	30	10	10	10	48	47	+1	40	
10	Vosselaar	30	10	8	12	45	59	−14	38	
11	Hoogstraten	30	9	10	11	30	33	−3	37	
12	Hamme	30	10	6	14	44	48	−4	36	
13	Spouwen-Mopertingen	30	9	8	13	48	56	−8	35	
14	City Pirates (R)	30	9	7	14	35	42	−7	34	Qualification for the relegation play-offs
15	Turnhout (R)	30	7	8	15	38	58	−20	29	Relegation to the 2019–20 Belgian Third Amateur Division
16	Heur-Tongeren (R)	30	3	5	22	30	82	−52	14	Relegation to the 2019–20 Belgian Third Amateur Division

Source: vbal4
Rules for classification: 1) Points; 2) Goal difference; 3) Goals scored.
(C) Champions; (P) Promoted; (R) Relegated

===== Division C =====
Pos	Team	Pld	W	D	L	GF	GA	GD	Pts	Qualification or relegation
1	La Louvière Centre (C, P)	30	24	5	1	83	19	+64	77	Promotion to the 2019–20 Belgian First Amateur Division
2	Visé (P)	30	19	4	7	68	36	+32	61	Qualification for the Promotion play-offs ACFF (Note: Only clubs which had received a licence to play in the 2019–20 Belgian First Amateur Division were allowed to take part in the promotion playoffs. As a result, Hamoir and Rebecq were replaced by the two highest finishers not already qualified: Tilleur and La Louvière.)
3	Hamoir	30	17	8	5	56	34	+22	59	
4	Francs Borains	30	15	7	8	59	42	+17	52	Qualification for the Promotion play-offs ACFF
5	Rebecq	30	15	6	9	60	44	+16	51	
6	Tilleur	30	14	5	11	54	45	+9	47	Qualification for the Promotion play-offs ACFF
7	La Louvière	30	12	10	8	42	30	+12	46	Qualification for the Promotion play-offs ACFF
8	Durbuy	30	12	3	15	37	50	−13	39	
9	Meux	30	9	12	9	51	51	0	39	
10	Couvin-Mariembourg	30	10	8	12	50	51	−1	38	
11	Waremme	30	10	5	15	46	53	−7	35	
12	Solières	30	8	7	15	38	56	−18	31	
13	Acren-Lessines	30	6	11	13	42	53	−11	29	
14	Walhain (R)	30	7	7	16	33	52	−19	28	Relegation to the 2019–20 Belgian Third Amateur Division
15	Olympic Charleroi (Note: Olympic Charleroi was relegated based on its finishing position, but merged after the season with Châtelet to become Olympic Charleroi Châtelet Farciennes. Châtelet was playing in the Belgian First Amateur Division and ceased to exist, while the new club took its position in the league. As a result there was de facto one team less relegating to the 2019–20 Belgian Second Amateur Division and therefore an extra team was promoted from the Belgian Provincial Leagues to fill the gap.) (R)	30	5	9	16	32	61	−29	24	Relegation to the 2019–20 Belgian Third Amateur Division
16	Ciney (R)	30	2	3	25	22	96	−74	9	Relegation to the 2019–20 Belgian Third Amateur Division

Source: vbal4
Rules for classification: 1) Points; 2) Goal difference; 3) Goals scored.
(C) Champions; (P) Promoted; (R) Relegated

==== Belgian Third Amateur Division ====
===== Division A =====
Pos	Team	Pld	W	D	L	GF	GA	GD	Pts	Qualification or relegation
1	Merelbeke (C, P)	30	17	8	5	49	25	+24	59	Promotion to the 2019–20 Belgian Second Amateur Division
2	Wetteren	30	17	6	7	60	36	+24	57	Qualification to Promotion play-offs VFV
3	Zwevezele (P)	30	16	7	7	63	35	+28	55	Qualification to Promotion play-offs VFV
4	Pepingen-Halle (P)	30	14	9	7	49	30	+19	51	Qualification to Promotion play-offs VFV
5	Wingene	30	13	10	7	42	32	+10	49	Qualification to Promotion play-offs VFV
6	Stekene	30	14	5	11	38	37	+1	47	
7	Zelzate	30	13	8	9	49	37	+12	47	
8	Lebbeke	30	12	8	10	41	40	+1	44	
9	Melsele	30	11	8	11	32	36	−4	41	
10	Lede	30	9	11	10	36	38	−2	38	
11	Wolvertem Merchtem	30	10	5	15	35	45	−10	35	
12	Torhout	30	9	7	14	50	56	−6	34	
13	Oostkamp (R)	30	9	4	17	55	62	−7	31	Qualification to Relegation play-offs VFV
14	Wervik (R)	30	8	6	16	30	56	−26	30	Relegation to the 2019–20 Belgian Provincial Leagues
15	Kampenhout (R)	30	6	7	17	30	48	−18	25	Relegation to the 2019–20 Belgian Provincial Leagues
16	Woluwe-Zaventem (R)	30	7	1	22	41	87	−46	22	Relegation to the 2019–20 Belgian Provincial Leagues

Updated to match(es) played on 14 March 2019. Source: https://www.vbal4.be/p010241.htm
(C) Champions; (P) Promoted; (R) Relegated

===== Division B =====
Pos	Team	Pld	W	D	L	GF	GA	GD	Pts	Qualification or relegation
1	Tienen (C, P)	30	20	5	5	57	27	+30	65	Promotion to the 2019–20 Belgian Second Amateur Division
2	Houtvenne	30	15	8	7	54	37	+17	53	Qualification to Promotion play-offs VFV
3	Lyra-Lierse Berlaar	30	14	10	6	48	32	+16	52	Qualification to Promotion play-offs VFV
4	Sint-Lenaarts	30	13	7	10	58	46	+12	46	Qualification to Promotion play-offs VFV
5	Betekom	30	13	6	11	52	50	+2	45	Qualification to Promotion play-offs VFV
6	Zwarte Leeuw	30	11	10	9	50	48	+2	43	
7	Termien	30	11	10	9	45	45	0	43	
8	Wellen	30	11	9	10	45	42	+3	42	
9	Helson Helchteren	30	11	7	12	47	54	−7	40	
10	Esperanza Pelt	30	11	4	15	37	52	−15	37	
11	Bornem	30	9	10	11	40	36	+4	37	
12	Bilzen	30	8	11	11	53	58	−5	35	
13	Ternesse (R)	30	9	6	15	38	52	−14	33	Qualification to Relegation play-offs VFV
14	Nijlen (R)	30	8	7	15	36	50	−14	31	Relegation to the 2019–20 Belgian Provincial Leagues
15	Leopoldsburg (R)	30	8	6	16	35	56	−21	30	Relegation to the 2019–20 Belgian Provincial Leagues
16	KRC Mechelen (R)	30	7	6	17	36	46	−10	27	Relegation to the 2019–20 Belgian Provincial Leagues

Updated to match(es) played on 11 March 2019. Source: https://www.vbal4.be/p010242.htm
(C) Champions; (P) Promoted; (R) Relegated

===== Division C =====
Pos	Team	Pld	W	D	L	GF	GA	GD	Pts	Qualification or relegation
1	Namur Fosses (C, P)	30	18	6	6	68	29	+39	60	Promotion to the 2019–20 Belgian Second Amateur Division
2	CS Braine	30	17	9	4	58	47	+11	60	Qualification to Promotion play-offs ACFF
3	Aische	30	16	6	8	59	47	+12	54	Qualification to Promotion play-offs ACFF
4	Tournai	30	14	10	6	46	25	+21	52	Qualification to Promotion play-offs ACFF
5	Léopold Uccle	30	14	6	10	53	36	+17	48	Qualification to Promotion play-offs ACFF
6	Ostiches-Ath	30	14	5	11	55	47	+8	47	
7	Manageoise	30	13	8	9	50	38	+12	47	
8	Quévy-Mons	30	13	5	12	45	45	0	44	
9	Symphorinois	30	11	10	9	50	50	0	43	
10	Stade Brainois	30	11	6	13	37	36	+1	39	
11	Jette	30	9	7	14	48	56	−8	34	
12	Wavre Sports	30	9	5	16	42	63	−21	32	
13	Ganshoren	30	7	10	13	44	61	−17	31	Qualification to Relegation play-offs ACFF
14	Tamines (R)	30	7	8	15	45	65	−20	29	Relegation to the 2019–20 Belgian Provincial Leagues
15	Stockel (R)	30	6	5	19	38	69	−31	23	Relegation to the 2019–20 Belgian Provincial Leagues
16	Binche (R)	30	4	8	18	33	73	−40	20	Relegation to the 2019–20 Belgian Provincial Leagues

Source: https://www.vbal4.be/p020241.htm
(C) Champions; (P) Promoted; (R) Relegated

===== Division D =====
Pos	Team	Pld	W	D	L	GF	GA	GD	Pts	Qualification or relegation
1	Stockay (C, P)	30	21	5	4	75	36	+39	68	Promotion to the 2019–20 Belgian Second Amateur Division
2	Givry (P)	30	20	5	5	59	31	+28	65	Qualification to Promotion play-offs ACFF
3	Richelle	30	18	9	3	61	23	+38	63	Qualification to Promotion play-offs ACFF
4	Verlaine (P)	30	16	7	7	52	35	+17	55	Qualification to Promotion play-offs ACFF
5	Onhaye (P)	30	13	10	7	64	47	+17	49	Qualification to Promotion play-offs ACFF
6	Warnant	30	14	6	10	54	40	+14	48	
7	Aywaille	30	12	9	9	48	41	+7	45	
8	Meix-devant-Virton	30	12	7	11	46	43	+3	43	
9	Sprimont	30	12	6	12	53	51	+2	42	
10	Herstal	30	12	6	12	56	61	−5	42	
11	Mormont	30	9	10	11	48	56	−8	37	
12	Huy	30	8	9	13	46	59	−13	33	
13	Oppagne-Wéris	30	8	7	15	46	63	−17	31	Qualification to Relegation play-offs ACFF
14	Longlier (R)	30	5	2	23	40	79	−39	17	Relegation to the 2019–20 Belgian Provincial Leagues
15	Union La Calamine (R)	30	3	6	21	30	61	−31	15	Relegation to the 2019–20 Belgian Provincial Leagues
16	Condruzien (R)	30	3	4	23	26	78	−52	13	Relegation to the 2019–20 Belgian Provincial Leagues

Source: https://www.vbal4.be/p020242z9.htm
(C) Champions; (P) Promoted; (R) Relegated

=== Cup competitions ===
Competition	Winner	Score	Runner-up
2018–19 Belgian Cup	Mechelen	2–1	Gent
2018 Belgian Super Cup	Club Brugge	2–1	Standard Liège

== UEFA competitions ==
Champions Club Brugge qualified directly for the group stage of the Champions League, while runners-up Standard Liège started in the qualifying rounds. As Standard Liège also had won the Belgian Cup, third placed Anderlecht qualified directly for the group stage of the Europa League, while Gent and Genk started in the qualifying rounds.

Date	Team	Competition	Round	Leg	Opponent	Location	Score	Belgian Team Goalscorers
26 July 2018	Genk	Europa League	Qual. Round 2	Leg 1, Home	(Luxembourg) Fola Esch	Luminus Arena, Genk	5–0	Malinovskyi, Pozuelo, Trossard (2), Dewaest
1 August 2018	Genk	Europa League	Qual. Round 2	Leg 2, Away	(Luxembourg) Fola Esch	Stade Émile Mayrisch, Esch-sur-Alzette	1–4	Zhegrova (2), Heynen, Gano
7 August 2018	Standard Liège	Champions League	Qual. Round 3	Leg 1, Home	(Netherlands) Ajax	Stade Maurice Dufrasne, Liège	2–2	Carcela, Emond
9 August 2018	Genk	Europa League	Qual. Round 3	Leg 1, Home	(Poland) Lech Poznań	Luminus Arena, Genk	2–0	Malinovskyi, Samatta
9 August 2018	Gent	Europa League	Qual. Round 3	Leg 1, Away	(Poland) Jagiellonia Białystok	Białystok City Stadium, Białystok	0–1	David
14 August 2018	Standard Liège	Champions League	Qual. Round 3	Leg 2, Away	(Netherlands) Ajax	Johan Cruijff Arena, Amsterdam	3–0	
16 August 2018	Genk	Europa League	Qual. Round 3	Leg 2, Away	(Poland) Lech Poznań	Stadion Miejski, Poznań	1–2	Samatta, Trossard
16 August 2018	Gent	Europa League	Qual. Round 3	Leg 2, Home	(Poland) Jagiellonia Białystok	Ghelamco Arena, Ghent	3–1	Awoniyi, Yaremchuk, David
23 August 2018	Genk	Europa League	Play-off round	Leg 1, Home	(Denmark) Brøndby	Luminus Arena, Genk	5–2	Samatta (3), Trossard (2)
23 August 2018	Gent	Europa League	Play-off round	Leg 1, Home	(France) Bordeaux	Ghelamco Arena, Ghent	0–0	
30 August 2018	Genk	Europa League	Play-off round	Leg 2, Away	(Denmark) Brøndby	Brøndby Stadium, Brøndbyvester	2–4	Malinovskyi, Ndongala, Dewaest, Samatta
30 August 2018	Gent	Europa League	Play-off round	Leg 2, Away	(France) Bordeaux	Nouveau Stade de Bordeaux, Bordeaux	2–0	
18 September 2018	Club Brugge	Champions League	Group Stage	Matchday 1, Home	(Germany) Borussia Dortmund	Jan Breydel Stadium, Bruges	0–1	
20 September 2018	Anderlecht	Europa League	Group Stage	Matchday 1, Away	(Slovakia) Spartak Trnava	Štadión Antona Malatinského, Trnava	1–0	
20 September 2018	Genk	Europa League	Group Stage	Matchday 1, Home	(Sweden) Malmö	Luminus Arena, Genk	2–0	Trossard, Samatta
20 September 2018	Standard Liège	Europa League	Group Stage	Matchday 1, Away	(Spain) Sevilla	Ramón Sánchez Pizjuán Stadium, Seville	5–1	Djenepo
3 October 2018	Club Brugge	Champions League	Group Stage	Matchday 2, Away	(Spain) Atlético Madrid	Wanda Metropolitano, Madrid	3–1	Groeneveld
4 October 2018	Anderlecht	Europa League	Group Stage	Matchday 2, Home	(Croatia) Dinamo Zagreb	Constant Vanden Stock Stadium, Anderlecht	0–2	
4 October 2018	Genk	Europa League	Group Stage	Matchday 2, Away	(Norway) Sarpsborg 08	Sarpsborg Stadion, Sarpsborg	3–1	Trossard
4 October 2018	Standard Liège	Europa League	Group Stage	Matchday 2, Home	(Turkey) Akhisarspor	Stade Maurice Dufrasne, Liège	2–1	Emond, Djenepo
24 October 2018	Club Brugge	Champions League	Group Stage	Matchday 3, Home	(France) Monaco	Jan Breydel Stadium, Bruges	1–1	Wesley
25 October 2018	Anderlecht	Europa League	Group Stage	Matchday 3, Home	(Turkey) Fenerbahçe	Constant Vanden Stock Stadium, Anderlecht	2–2	Bakkali (2)
25 October 2018	Genk	Europa League	Group Stage	Matchday 3, Away	(Turkey) Beşiktaş	Vodafone Park, Istanbul	2–4	Samatta (2), Ndongala, Piotrowski
25 October 2018	Standard Liège	Europa League	Group Stage	Matchday 3, Home	(Russia) Krasnodar	Stade Maurice Dufrasne, Liège	2–1	Emond, Laifis
6 November 2018	Club Brugge	Champions League	Group Stage	Matchday 4, Away	(France) Monaco	Stade Louis II, Monaco	0–4	Vanaken (2), Wesley, Vormer
8 November 2018	Anderlecht	Europa League	Group Stage	Matchday 4, Away	(Turkey) Fenerbahçe	Şükrü Saracoğlu Stadium, Istanbul	2–0	
8 November 2018	Genk	Europa League	Group Stage	Matchday 4, Home	(Turkey) Beşiktaş	Luminus Arena, Genk	1–1	Berge
8 November 2018	Standard Liège	Europa League	Group Stage	Matchday 4, Away	(Russia) Krasnodar	Krasnodar Stadium, Krasnodar	2–1	Carcela
28 November 2018	Club Brugge	Champions League	Group Stage	Matchday 5, Away	(Germany) Borussia Dortmund	Westfalenstadion, Dortmund	0–0	
29 November 2018	Anderlecht	Europa League	Group Stage	Matchday 5, Home	(Slovakia) Spartak Trnava	Constant Vanden Stock Stadium, Anderlecht	0–0	
29 November 2018	Genk	Europa League	Group Stage	Matchday 5, Away	(Sweden) Malmö	Stadion, Malmö	2–2	Pozuelo, Paintsil
29 November 2018	Standard Liège	Europa League	Group Stage	Matchday 5, Home	(Spain) Sevilla	Stade Maurice Dufrasne, Liège	1–0	Djenepo
11 December 2018	Club Brugge	Champions League	Group Stage	Matchday 6, Home	(Spain) Atlético Madrid	Jan Breydel Stadium, Bruges	0–0	
13 December 2018	Anderlecht	Europa League	Group Stage	Matchday 6, Away	(Croatia) Dinamo Zagreb	Stadion Maksimir, Zagreb	0–0	
13 December 2018	Genk	Europa League	Group Stage	Matchday 6, Home	(Norway) Sarpsborg 08	Luminus Arena, Genk	4–0	Gano, Paintsil, Berge, Aidoo
13 December 2018	Standard Liège	Europa League	Group Stage	Matchday 6, Away	(Turkey) Akhisarspor	Spor Toto Akhisar Stadium, Akhisar	0–0	
14 February 2019	Club Brugge	Europa League	Round of 32	Leg 1, Home	(Austria) Red Bull Salzburg	Jan Breydel Stadium, Bruges	2–1	Denswil, Wesley
14 February 2019	Genk	Europa League	Round of 32	Leg 1, Away	(Czech Republic) Slavia Prague	Sinobo Stadium, Prague	0–0	
21 February 2019	Club Brugge	Europa League	Round of 32	Leg 2, Away	(Austria) Red Bull Salzburg	Red Bull Arena, Salzburg	4–0	
21 February 2019	Genk	Europa League	Round of 32	Leg 2, Home	(Czech Republic) Slavia Prague	Luminus Arena, Genk	1–4	Trossard

=== European qualification for 2019–20 summary ===
Competition	Qualifiers	Reason for Qualification
UEFA Champions League Group Stage	Genk	1st in Belgian First Division A
UEFA Champions League Third Qualifying Round for Non-Champions	Club Brugge	2nd in Belgian First Division A
UEFA Europa League Group Stage	Standard Liège (Note: KV Mechelen were banned from European football as punishment for match-fixing as part of the 2017–18 Belgian football fraud investigation, as Belgian Cup winners they would have qualified for the Group Stage of the 2019–20 UEFA Europa League. As a result, third-placed Standard Liège took their spot, while Antwerp took the spot of Standard Liège in the Third Qualifying Round. The remaining spot was allocated to the highest team in the league not already qualified for Europe, fifth-placed Gent.)	3rd in Belgian First Division A
UEFA Europa League Third Qualifying Round	Antwerp	Europa League Playoff winner
UEFA Europa League Second Qualifying Round	Gent	5th in Belgian First Division A

== Managerial changes ==
This is a list of changes of managers within Belgian professional league football (Belgian First Division A and Belgian First Division B):

Team	Outgoing manager	Manner of departure	Date of vacancy	Position	Replaced by	Date of appointment
Oostende	(Bosnia and Herzegovina) Adnan Čustović	Replaced	End of 2017–18 season	Pre-season	(Belgium) Gert Verheyen	25 April 2018 (Note: Verheyen was announced as manager on 25 April 2018 but only replaced Adnan Čustović after the final match of the season.)
Sint-Truiden	(Belgium) Jonas De Roeck	Replaced	End of 2017–18 season (Note: The announcement of De Roeck being replaced was made on 20 April 2018, together with the news he would complete the season.)	Pre-season	(Belgium) Marc Brys	21 May 2018
Standard Liège	(Portugal) Ricardo Sá Pinto	Resigned	End of 2017–18 season	Pre-season	(Belgium) Michel Preud'homme	23 May 2018
Union SG	(Belgium) Marc Grosjean	Mutual consent	End of 2017–18 season	Pre-season	(Slovenia) Luka Elsner	23 May 2018
Beerschot Wilrijk	(Belgium) Marc Brys	Signed by Sint-Truiden	End of 2017–18 season	Pre-season	(Belgium) Stijn Vreven	25 May 2018
Cercle Brugge	(Belgium) Franky Vercauteren	Mutual consent	End of 2017–18 season	Pre-season	(France) Laurent Guyot	6 June 2018
Waasland-Beveren	(Belgium) Dirk Geeraerd	Caretaker replaced	End of 2017–18 season	Pre-season	(Belgium) Yannick Ferrera	8 June 2018
Mechelen	(Netherlands) Dennis van Wijk	Sacked	20 August 2018	7th	(Belgium) Wouter Vrancken	21 August 2018
Excel Mouscron	(Belgium) Frank Defays	Sacked	30 August 2018	16th	(Germany) Bernd Storck	2 September 2018
Gent	(Belgium) Yves Vanderhaeghe	Sacked	8 October 2018	7th	(Denmark) Jess Thorup	10 October 2018
Lokeren	(Belgium) Peter Maes	Sacked	27 October 2018	15th	(Iceland) Arnar Viðarsson (caretaker)	27 October 2018
Lokeren	(Iceland) Arnar Viðarsson (caretaker)	Caretaker replaced	2 November 2018 (Note: The announcement of Viðarsson being replaced was made on 29 October 2018, but he remained in charge for the match against Anderlecht on 1 November, with Sollied taking over only the day after.)	16th	(Norway) Trond Sollied	2 November 2018
Roeselare	(Spain) Jordi Condom	Sacked	10 November 2018	7th	(Spain) Nano	12 November 2018
Waasland-Beveren	(Belgium) Yannick Ferrera	Sacked	11 November 2018	14th	(Bosnia and Herzegovina) Adnan Čustović	17 November 2018
Kortrijk	(Belgium) Glen De Boeck	Sacked	15 November 2018	12th	(Belgium) Yves Vanderhaeghe	15 November 2018
Anderlecht	(Belgium) Hein Vanhaezebrouck	Sacked	16 December 2018	4th	(France) Karim Belhocine (caretaker)	16 December 2018
Anderlecht	(France) Karim Belhocine (caretaker)	Caretaker replaced	6 January 2019	5th	(Netherlands) Fred Rutten	6 January 2019
Roeselare	(Spain) Nano	Release fee paid by Shanghai Greenland Shenhua	8 January 2019	Closing tournament: 4th Overall: 6th	(Spain) Juanito	11 January 2019
Lokeren	(Norway) Trond Sollied	Sacked	20 January 2019	16th	(Belgium) Glen De Boeck	20 January 2019
OH Leuven	(England) Nigel Pearson	Sacked	3 February 2019	Closing tournament: 7th Overall: 8th	(Belgium) Vincent Euvrard	8 February 2019
Oostende	(Belgium) Gert Verheyen	Resigned	6 March 2019	14th	(Belgium) Hugo Broos (caretaker)	6 March 2019
Anderlecht	(Netherlands) Fred Rutten	Mutual consent	16 April 2019	Regular season: 4th Championship POs: 5th	(France) Karim Belhocine (caretaker)	16 April 2019
Oostende	(Belgium) Hugo Broos (caretaker)	Resigned	29 April 2019	Regular season: 14th Europa League POs: 4th	(Belgium) Franky Van der Elst (caretaker)	29 April 2019
Cercle Brugge	(France) Laurent Guyot	Mutual consent	2 May 2019	Regular season: 13th Europa League POs: 4th	(Belgium) José Jeunechamps (caretaker)	2 May 2019

== See also ==
- 2018–19 Belgian First Division A
- 2018–19 Belgian First Division B
- 2018–19 Belgian First Amateur Division
- 2018–19 Belgian Second Amateur Division
- 2018–19 Belgian Third Amateur Division
- 2018–19 Belgian Cup
- 2018 Belgian Super Cup
