= 2019–20 Belgian Second Amateur Division =

Belgian Second Amateur Division
- Season: 2019–20
- Champions: Knokke (A), Tienen (B) & Francs Borains (C)
- Promoted: Knokke, Tienen & Francs Borains
- Relegated: Hamme & Sint-Niklaas (A); Duffel, Geel & Vosselaar (B); Namur FLV, Onhaye & Tilleur (C)

The 2019–20 Belgian Second Amateur Division was the fourth season of the division in its current format, placed at the fourth-tier of football in Belgium. Mid-March all matches were temporarily postponed due to the COVID-19 pandemic in Belgium, only to be canceled permanently two weeks later, with the standing as of March 12 counting as final. As a result, Knokke, Tienen and Francs Borains were crowned champions in their respective league and were each promoted to the 2020–21 Belgian First Amateur Division.

The division consists of three separate leagues, each containing 16 teams. Leagues A and B consist of teams with a license from the Voetbalfederatie Vlaanderen (VFV, the Flemish/Dutch speaking wing of the Belgian FA), while league C contains teams with a license from the Association des Clubs Francophones de Football (ACFF, the French-speaking wing of the RBFA). The champions from each of the three leagues will promote to the 2020–21 Belgian First Amateur Division. The fixtures were announced in early July 2019.

== Team changes ==
=== In ===
- ASV Geel, Eendracht Aalst and Knokke after finishing in the relegation zone in the 2018–19 Belgian First Amateur Division.
- Oudenaarde was also relegated from the 2018–19 Belgian First Amateur Division after losing the Second Amateur Division promotion play-offs, where the team failed to regain its place in the First Amateur Division.
- Merelbeke was promoted after winning the 2018–19 Belgian Third Amateur Division A.
- Tienen was promoted after winning the 2018–19 Belgian Third Amateur Division B.
- Namur Fosses was promoted after winning the 2018–19 Belgian Third Amateur Division C.
- Stockay-Warfusée was promoted after winning the 2018–19 Belgian Third Amateur Division D.
- Pepingen-Halle and Zwevezele were promoted as winners of the Third Amateur Division promotion play-offs VFV.
- Onhaye and Verlaine were promoted as winners of the Third Amateur Division promotion play-offs ACFF.
- Givry was also promoted for finishing third in the Third Amateur Division promotion play-offs ACFF as an extra ACFF spot opened up due to the promotion of Visé to the 2019–20 Belgian First Amateur Division.

=== Out ===
- Sint-Eloois-Winkel was promoted after winning the 2018–19 Belgian Second Amateur Division A.
- Patro Eisden Maasmechelen was promoted after winning the 2018–19 Belgian Second Amateur Division B.
- La Louvière Centre was promoted after winning the 2018–19 Belgian Second Amateur Division C.
- Visé was promoted after winning the Promotion play-offs.
- Overijse, Brakel, Turnhout, Heur-Tongeren, Wallonia Walhain and Ciney were all relegated after finishing in the relegation positions the previous season.
- Olympic Charleroi was relegated as well, but the club merged with Châtelet playing in the 2018–19 Belgian First Amateur Division to become Olympic Charleroi CF. As such the club will play in the 2019–20 Belgian First Amateur Division.
- City Pirates was relegated after losing the Relegation play-offs.
- Despite winning the relegation play-offs, Eppegem was also relegated due to the promotion of ACFF team Visé, forcing an extra VFV team to be relegated.

== Belgian Second Amateur Division A ==
Locations of the 2019–20 Belgian Second Amateur Division A teams

=== League table ===
Pos	Team	Pld	W	D	L	GF	GA	GD	Pts	Qualification or relegation
1	Knokke (C, P)	24	20	3	1	57	15	+42	63	Promotion to the 2020–21 Belgian First Amateur Division
2	Mandel United (P)	24	14	3	7	51	31	+20	45	Promotion to the 2020–21 Belgian First Amateur Division
3	Ronse	24	14	3	7	42	26	+16	45	
4	Oudenaarde	24	13	3	8	54	46	+8	42	
5	Gent-Zeehaven	24	12	5	7	36	29	+7	41	
6	Petegem	24	11	6	7	51	39	+12	39	
7	Gullegem	24	11	6	7	36	32	+4	39	
8	Zwevezele	24	11	5	8	41	28	+13	38	
9	Harelbeke	24	10	5	9	30	35	−5	35	
10	Dikkelvenne	24	9	4	11	35	37	−2	31	
11	Westhoek	24	9	1	14	29	48	−19	28	
12	Temse (Note: Following a merge with Lokeren a new club was created, Lokeren-Temse, to be continued to play at the fourth level (Belgian Second Amateur Division).)	24	6	6	12	22	38	−16	24	
13	Menen	24	5	5	14	28	47	−19	20	
14	Merelbeke	24	4	7	13	25	41	−16	19	
15	Sint-Niklaas (R)	24	4	4	16	22	49	−27	16	Relegation to the 2020–21 Belgian Third Amateur Division
16	Hamme (R)	24	3	6	15	34	52	−18	15	Relegation to the 2020–21 Belgian Third Amateur Division

Source: vbal4
Rules for classification: 1) Points; 2) Matches won; 3) Goal difference; 4) Goals scored; 5) Away matches won; 6) Goal difference in away matches; 7) Away goals scored.
(C) Champions; (P) Promoted; (R) Relegated

== Belgian Second Amateur Division B ==
Locations of the 2019–20 Belgian Second Amateur Division B teams

=== League table ===
Pos	Team	Pld	W	D	L	GF	GA	GD	Pts	Qualification or relegation
1	Tienen (C, P)	23	14	2	7	40	28	+12	44	Promotion to the 2020–21 Belgian First Amateur Division
2	Bocholt	23	12	6	5	38	24	+14	42	
3	Aalst	22	12	4	6	38	23	+15	41.82 (Note: Aalst, Cappellen, Diegem, Geel, Hades, Hasselt, Hoogstraten, Spouwen-Mopertingen and Vosselaar had played one match less at the time the competition was stopped, therefore their points were scaled up by a factor 23/22.)	
4	Cappellen	22	10	5	7	34	26	+8	36.59	
5	Hades	22	9	6	7	32	29	+3	34.5	
6	Hasselt	22	8	9	5	29	30	−1	34.5	
7	Vosselaar (Note: On 18 January 2020, Vosselaar announced it would not be applying for a license to play in the national amateur leagues during the 2020–21 season due to the excessive financial costs. As a result, the team will be relegated to Belgian Provincial Leagues (but won't suffer any starting penalty as they will finish the season).) (R)	22	10	2	10	34	31	+3	33.45	Relegation to the Belgian Provincial Leagues
8	Diegem	22	9	4	9	26	26	0	32.41	
9	Berchem	23	7	7	9	31	35	−4	28	
10	Geel (Note: On 22 January 2020, due to financial difficulties, Geel announced that during the 2019–20 transfer window all players and technical staff have been released without any transfer fee, to avoid bankrupting the club. Youth players will play the remaining matches and management will devise a plan for the coming seasons. Eventually, Geel did not receive a license for both the Second and Third Amateur divisions and should normally be relegating to the Belgian Provincial Leagues as well. Geel is, however, appealing the decision to not being awarded a license. If the appeal is successful, they will remain in the Belgian Second Amateur Division.) (R)	22	7	5	10	25	30	−5	27.18	Relegation to the Belgian Provincial Leagues
11	Londerzeel	23	7	6	10	30	37	−7	27	
12	Wijgmaal	23	7	5	11	37	38	−1	26	
13	Pepingen-Halle	23	6	7	10	24	31	−7	25	
14	Hoogstraten	22	6	5	11	27	31	−4	24.05	
15	Spouwen-Mopertingen	22	6	3	13	21	47	−26	21.95	
16	Duffel (Note: On 28 January 2020, Duffel announced it would not be competing for the remainder of the season. As per the rules of the Belgian FA, all the results of Duffel were annulled and Duffel will be ranked last and penalized with a further relegation, starting the 2020–21 season at the first level of the Belgian Provincial Leagues (sixth level overall) with a nine-point penalty.) (R)	0	0	0	0	0	0	0	0	Relegation to the Belgian Provincial Leagues

Source: vbal4
Rules for classification: 1) Points; 2) Matches won; 3) Goal difference; 4) Goals scored; 5) Away matches won; 6) Goal difference in away matches; 7) Away goals scored.
(C) Champions; (P) Promoted; (R) Relegated

== Belgian Second Amateur Division C ==
Locations of the 2019–20 Belgian Second Amateur Division C teams

=== League table ===
Pos	Team	Pld	W	D	L	GF	GA	GD	Pts	Qualification or relegation
1	Francs Borains (C, P)	24	15	7	2	50	17	+33	52	Promotion to the 2020–21 Belgian First Amateur Division
2	Meux	24	13	9	2	46	26	+20	48	
3	La Louvière	23	13	7	3	38	18	+20	48 (Note: Couvin-Mariembourg, La Louvière, Solières and Tilleur had played one match less at the time the competition was stopped, therefore their points were scaled up by a factor 24/23.)	
4	Rebecq	24	12	8	4	41	24	+17	44	
5	Hamoir	24	13	4	7	48	34	+14	43	
6	Stockay	22	10	4	8	43	37	+6	37.09 (Note: Stockay and Verlaine had played two matches less at the time the competition was stopped, therefore their points were scaled up by a factor 24/22.)	
7	Durbuy	24	8	11	5	44	39	+5	35	
8	Givry	24	10	3	11	33	38	−5	33	
9	Acren-Lessines	24	8	4	12	45	49	−4	28	
10	Tilleur (Note: Tilleur did not apply for a license and was therefore relegated to the Belgian Provincial Leagues.) (R)	23	7	5	11	28	40	−12	27.13	Relegation to the Belgian Provincial Leagues
11	Verlaine	22	7	3	12	33	47	−14	26.18	
12	Couvin-Mariembourg	23	7	4	12	35	38	−3	26.09	
13	Waremme	24	6	4	14	30	52	−22	22	
14	Solières	23	6	3	14	26	45	−19	21.91	
15	Namur FLV (R)	24	7	0	17	29	53	−24	21	Relegation to the 2020–21 Belgian Third Amateur Division
16	Onhaye (R)	24	5	6	13	27	39	−12	21	Relegation to the 2020–21 Belgian Third Amateur Division

Source: vbal4
Rules for classification: 1) Points; 2) Matches won; 3) Goal difference; 4) Goals scored; 5) Away matches won; 6) Goal difference in away matches; 7) Away goals scored.
(C) Champions; (P) Promoted; (R) Relegated
