= List of Belgian football transfers winter 2018–19 =

This is a list of Belgian football transfers for the 2018–19 winter transfer window. Only transfers involving a team from the professional divisions are listed, including the 16 teams in the 2018–19 Belgian First Division A and the 8 teams playing in the 2018–19 Belgian First Division B.

The winter transfer window opens on 1 January 2019, although a few transfers may take place prior to that date. The window closes at midnight on 1 February 2019 although outgoing transfers might still happen to leagues in which the window is still open. Players without a club may join teams, either during or in between transfer windows.

== Sorted by date ==
=== June ===
Date	Name	Moving from	Moving to	Fee	Note
16 June 2018	Jeffrey Ket	Lommel	Quick Boys	Undisclosed	(Note: As part of a combined deal, Ket was on loan from Lommel to Quick Boys for the first six months of the 2018-19 season, after which Ket would make a permanent transfer.)

=== December ===
Date	Name	Moving from	Moving to	Fee	Note
7 December 2018	Hannes Smolders	Mechelen	Lierse Kempenzonen	Undisclosed	
21 December 2018	Lovre Kalinić	Gent	Aston Villa	Undisclosed	
27 December 2018	Diego Montiel	Örgryte	Beerschot Wilrijk	Undisclosed	
31 December 2018	Faysel Kasmi	Beerschot Wilrijk	Free agent	Released	
31 December 2018	Dimitris Kolovos	Mechelen	Omonia	Loan	(Note: Kolovos was on loan from Mechelen to Willem II since the summer of 2018 season. The loan ended and Kolovos was now loaned to Omonia.)

=== End of 2018 ===
Some players were on a loan which ended in 2018. As of 1 January 2019, they returned to their original club and are listed here. For a list of players on loan during the last year, see List of Belgian football transfers winter 2017–18 and summer 2018.

Date	Name	Moving from	Moving to	Fee	Note
End of 2018	Fredrik Oldrup Jensen	Göteborg	Zulte Waregem	Loan return	

=== January ===
Date	Name	Moving from	Moving to	Fee	Note
2 January 2019	Carlinhos	Standard Liège	Guarani	Loan	
2 January 2019	Mohammad Naderi	Kortrijk	Persepolis	Loan	
3 January 2019	Neto Borges	Hammarby	Genk	Undisclosed	
3 January 2019	Gökhan Kardeş	Beerschot Wilrijk	Afjet Afyonspor	Loan	
3 January 2019	Jonathan Legear	Sint-Truiden	Adana Demirspor	Undisclosed	
4 January 2019	Ibrahima Ba	Tubize	Seraing	Undisclosed	
4 January 2019	Casper de Norre	Sint-Truiden	Genk	Undisclosed	
4 January 2019	Valeriy Luchkevych	Standard Liège	Oleksandriya	Loan	
4 January 2019	Darren Sidoel	Reading	Roeselare	Loan	
5 January 2019	Irakli Bugridze	Chikhura Sachkhere	Beerschot Wilrijk	Undisclosed	
5 January 2019	Stef Peeters	Caen	Zulte Waregem	Loan	
5 January 2019	Ibrahima Seck	Genk	Zulte Waregem	Loan	
5 January 2019	Bob Straetman	Lokeren	Virton	Loan	
5 January 2019	Idrissa Sylla	Queens Park Rangers	Zulte Waregem	Undisclosed	
7 January 2019	Thomas Kaminski	Kortrijk	Gent	Undisclosed	
7 January 2019	Luca Napoleone	Excel Mouscron	Virton	Undisclosed	
7 January 2019	Tobias Salquist	Waasland-Beveren	Lillestrøm	Undisclosed	
7 January 2019	Iebe Swers	Sint-Truiden	Seraing	Undisclosed	
8 January 2019	Jentl Gaethofs	Lommel	Dessel Sport	Loan	
8 January 2019	Alexander Sørloth	Crystal Palace	Gent	Loan	
8 January 2019	Oscar Threlkeld	Waasland-Beveren	Plymouth Argyle	Loan	
8 January 2019	Xandão	Cercle Brugge	Red Bull Brasil	Undisclosed	
9 January 2019	Mohamed Buya Turay	Sint-Truiden	Djurgården	Loan	
9 January 2019	Tom De Sutter	Free agent	Oostende	NA	
9 January 2019	Chad Letts	Atlanta United	Union SG	Undisclosed	
9 January 2019	Youssef Msakni	Al-Duhail	Eupen	Loan	
9 January 2019	Abou Ouattara	Mechelen	Lille	Loan	
10 January 2019	Franck Berrier	Mechelen	Free agent	Retired	
10 January 2019	Romain Grange	Charleroi	Grenoble	Loan	
10 January 2019	Kenny van der Weg	Roeselare	Ross County	Undisclosed	
11 January 2019	Abdul Jeleel Ajagun	Kortrijk	(Cyprus) Omonia	Loan	
11 January 2019	Taiwo Awoniyi	Gent	(England) Liverpool	Loan return	
11 January 2019	Taiwo Awoniyi	(England) Liverpool	Excel Mouscron	Loan	
11 January 2019	Adrian Beck	SSV Ulm 1846	Union SG	Undisclosed	
11 January 2019	Reda Jaadi	Antwerp	Dinamo București	Undisclosed	
11 January 2019	Kara Mbodji	Nantes	Anderlecht	Loan return	
13 January 2019	Aboud Omar	Cercle Brugge	Sepsi Sfântu Gheorghe	Undisclosed	
14 January 2019	Franck Irie	Cercle Brugge	Free agent	Released	
14 January 2019	Ismaël Kandouss	Dunkerque	Union SG	Undisclosed	
14 January 2019	Amin Nouri	Vålerenga	Oostende	Loan	
14 January 2019	Jakub Řezníček	Viktoria Plzeň	Lokeren	Undisclosed	
15 January 2019	Emmanuel Banda	Oostende	Béziers	Loan	
15 January 2019	Nils Bouekou	Union SG	RWDM47	Loan	
15 January 2019	Daan Heymans	Waasland-Beveren	Lommel	Loan	
15 January 2019	Stefan Milošević	Iskra Danilovgrad	Waasland-Beveren	Undisclosed	
15 January 2019	Leo Njengo	OH Leuven	Heist	Loan	
15 January 2019	Leandro Pereira	Club Brugge	Matsumoto Yamaga	Undisclosed	(Note: Pereira was on loan from Club Brugge to Chapecoense since the summer of 2018. The loan ended and Pereira was sold to Matsumoto Yamaga.)
16 January 2019	Sascha Kotysch	Sint-Truiden	OH Leuven	Undisclosed	
16 January 2019	Knowledge Musona	Anderlecht	Lokeren	Loan	
16 January 2019	Joher Rassoul	Lokeren	Adana Demirspor	Undisclosed	
16 January 2019	Peter Žulj	Sturm Graz	Anderlecht	Undisclosed	
17 January 2019	Sidney Friede	Hertha Berlin	Excel Mouscron	Loan	
17 January 2019	Erik Gliha	Aluminij	Sint-Truiden	Undisclosed	
17 January 2019	Thomas Henry	Tubize	OH Leuven	Undisclosed	
17 January 2019	Kanu	Kortrijk	(Saudi Arabia) Al-Raed	Undisclosed	
17 January 2019	Kosuke Kinoshita	Halmstad	Sint-Truiden	Undisclosed	
17 January 2019	Teddy Teuma	Red Star	Union SG	Undisclosed	
18 January 2019	Noam Debaisieux	Excel Mouscron	Ronse	Loan	
18 January 2019	David Simão	Boavista	Antwerp	Undisclosed	
21 January 2019	Edin Cocalić	Mechelen	Akhisarspor	Undisclosed	
21 January 2019	Nihad Mujakić	Sarajevo	Kortrijk	Undisclosed	
21 January 2019	Nihad Mujakić	Kortrijk	Sarajevo	Loan	
22 January 2019	Cristian Benavente	Charleroi	Pyramids	Undisclosed	
22 January 2019	Alexandros Katranis	Excel Mouscron	Saint-Étienne	Loan return	
22 January 2019	Issa Marega	Caen	Cercle Brugge	Undisclosed	
23 January 2019	Franko Andrijašević	Gent	Waasland-Beveren	Loan	
23 January 2019	Damien Dussaut	Sint-Truiden	Dinamo București	Undisclosed	
23 January 2019	Nicolas Raskin	Gent	Standard Liège	Undisclosed	
23 January 2019	Steve Ryckaert	Sint-Truiden	Eendracht Aalst	Undisclosed	
24 January 2019	Lamine Ndao	Waasland-Beveren	Gazélec Ajaccio	Undisclosed	
25 January 2019	Roman Bezus	Sint-Truiden	Gent	Undisclosed	
25 January 2019	Ahmed Mostafa	Gent	Smouha	Loan	
25 January 2019	Mamadou Sylla Diallo	Gent	Sint-Truiden	Loan	(Note: Sylla was on loan from Gent to Zulte Waregem since the summer of 2018. The loan was terminated early and Sylla was now loaned to Sint-Truiden.)
25 January 2019	Pierre Zebli	Ascoli	Genk	Loan return	
26 January 2019	Simon Bammens	Westerlo	Tessenderlo	Loan	
26 January 2019	Omid Noorafkan	Charleroi	Esteghlal	Loan	
26 January 2019	Juan Pablo Torres	Lokeren	New York City	Undisclosed	
28 January 2019	Rafidine Abdullah	Waasland-Beveren	Free agent	Released	
28 January 2019	Joep Hakkens	Genk	Lommel	Loan	
28 January 2019	Carlos Martínez	Eupen	Herediano	Undisclosed	
28 January 2019	Arsenio Valpoort	Busan IPark	Roeselare	Undisclosed	
29 January 2019	Zorhan Bassong	Lille	Cercle Brugge	Released	
29 January 2019	Jonathan Farías	Cercle Brugge	Free agent	Released	
30 January 2019	Firza Andika	PSMS	Tubize	Undisclosed	
30 January 2019	Mamadou Bagayoko	Mechelen	Red Star	Loan	
30 January 2019	Younes Delfi	Esteghlal Khuzestan	Charleroi	Undisclosed	
30 January 2019	Kingsley Madu	Zulte Waregem	Roeselare	Loan	
30 January 2019	Yanis Mbombo	Excel Mouscron	OH Leuven	Undisclosed	
30 January 2019	Ryota Morioka	Anderlecht	Charleroi	Loan	
30 January 2019	Willy Semedo	Roeselare	Charleroi	Loan return	
30 January 2019	Julien Vercauteren	Union SG	Virton	Undisclosed	
31 January 2019	Uche Henry Agbo	Standard Liège	Rayo Vallecano	Loan	
31 January 2019	Yannick Bolasie	Everton	Anderlecht	Loan	
31 January 2019	Esteban Casagolda	OH Leuven	Roeselare	Undisclosed	
31 January 2019	Joel Castro Pereira	(England) Manchester United	Kortrijk	Loan	
31 January 2019	Mohammed Dauda	Anderlecht	Vitesse	Loan	
31 January 2019	Dorian Dervite	Charleroi	NAC Breda	Loan	
31 January 2019	Aldom Deuro	Afrique Football Elite	Cercle Brugge	Undisclosed	
31 January 2019	Clément Fabre	OH Leuven	RWDM47	Undisclosed	
31 January 2019	Jo Gilis	OH Leuven	Eendracht Aalst	Loan	
31 January 2019	Alen Halilović	Milan	Standard Liège	Loan	
31 January 2019	Sam Hendriks	OH Leuven	Cambuur	Loan	
31 January 2019	Đorđe Jovanović	Lokeren	Cádiz	Undisclosed	
31 January 2019	Aboubakar Keita	Copenhagen	OH Leuven	Loan	
31 January 2019	Sibiry Keita	Aspire Academy Senegal	Eupen	Undisclosed	
31 January 2019	Kirill Klimov	Lokomotiv Moscow	Cercle Brugge	Undisclosed	
31 January 2019	Aboubakary Koita	Gent	Kortrijk	Loan	
31 January 2019	Christian Luyindama	Standard Liège	Galatasaray	Loan	
31 January 2019	Marko Maletić	Roeselare	Paris	Loan	(Note: Maletić was on loan from Roeselare to Dordrecht since the summer of 2018. The loan was terminated early and Maletić was now loaned to Paris.)
31 January 2019	Bojan Nastić	Genk	Oostende	Loan	
31 January 2019	Duckens Nazon	Sint-Truiden	St Mirren	Loan	
31 January 2019	Konan N'Dri	Aspire Academy Senegal	Eupen	Undisclosed	
31 January 2019	Thibault Peyre	Union SG	Mechelen	Undisclosed	
31 January 2019	Morteza Pouraliganji	Eupen	Al-Arabi	Undisclosed	
31 January 2019	Enes Sağlık	Charleroi	Tubize	Loan	
31 January 2019	Sanasi Sy	Amiens	Tubize	Loan	
31 January 2019	Adama Traoré	Monaco	Cercle Brugge	Loan	
31 January 2019	Vaso Vasic	Apollon Smyrnis	Excel Mouscron	Free	
31 January 2019	Daan Vekemans	OH Leuven	Eendracht Aalst	Loan	
31 January 2019	Olivier Werner	Excel Mouscron	Seraing	Undisclosed	
31 January 2019	Marco Weymans	Tubize	Östersund	Undisclosed	
31 January 2019	Salah Zakaria	Al-Wakrah	Eupen	Loan	

=== February ===
Date	Name	Moving from	Moving to	Fee	Note
1 February 2019	Jordy Peffer	Mechelen	Lyra-Lierse Berlaar	Loan	(Note: Peffer was on loan from Mechelen to Dessel Sport since the summer of 2018. The loan was terminated early and Peffer was now loaned to Lyra-Lierse Berlaar.)
1 February 2019	Willy Semedo	Charleroi	Politehnica Iași	Undisclosed	
2 February 2019	Junya Ito	Kashiwa Reysol	Genk	Loan	
3 February 2019	Ilombe Mboyo	Kortrijk	(Saudi Arabia) Al-Raed	Loan	
4 February 2019	Edon Zhegrova	Genk	Basel	Loan	

== Sorted by team ==
=== Belgian First Division A teams ===
==== Anderlecht ====
In:

No.	Pos.	Nation	Player
—	MF	COD	Yannick Bolasie (on loan from Everton)
—	DF	SEN	Kara Mbodji (loan return from Nantes)
—	MF	AUT	Peter Žulj (from Sturm Graz)

Out:

No.	Pos.	Nation	Player
10	MF	JPN	Ryota Morioka (on loan to Charleroi)
11	FW	ZIM	Knowledge Musona (on loan to Lokeren)
38	FW	GHA	Mohammed Dauda (on loan to Vitesse)

==== Antwerp ====
In:

No.	Pos.	Nation	Player
—	MF	POR	David Simão (from Boavista)

Out:

No.	Pos.	Nation	Player
7	MF	BEL	Reda Jaadi (to Dinamo București)

==== Cercle Brugge ====
In:

No.	Pos.	Nation	Player
—	DF	BEL	Zorhan Bassong (from Lille)
—	DF	MLI	Aldom Deuro (from Afrique Football Elite)
—	FW	RUS	Kirill Klimov (from Lokomotiv Moscow)
—	DF	FRA	Issa Marega (from Caen)
—	MF	MLI	Adama Traoré (on loan from Monaco)

Out:

No.	Pos.	Nation	Player
7	FW	ARG	Jonathan Farías (released)
23	FW	CIV	Franck Irie (released)
30	DF	KEN	Aboud Omar (to Sepsi Sfântu Gheorghe)
—	DF	BRA	Xandão (to Red Bull Brasil)

==== Charleroi ====
In:

No.	Pos.	Nation	Player
—	FW	IRI	Younes Delfi (from Esteghlal Khuzestan)
—	MF	JPN	Ryota Morioka (on loan from Anderlecht)

Out:

No.	Pos.	Nation	Player
5	DF	BEL	Dorian Dervite (on loan to NAC Breda)
7	MF	IRI	Omid Noorafkan (on loan to Esteghlal)
14	MF	PER	Cristian Benavente (to Pyramids)
28	MF	BEL	Enes Sağlık (on loan to Tubize)
29	MF	FRA	Romain Grange (on loan to Grenoble)
—	MF	FRA	Willy Semedo (was on loan to Roeselare, now sold to Politehnica Iași)

==== Club Brugge ====
In:

No.	Pos.	Nation	Player

Out:

No.	Pos.	Nation	Player
—	FW	BRA	Leandro Pereira (was on loan to Chapecoense, now sold to Matsumoto Yamaga)

==== Eupen ====
In:

No.	Pos.	Nation	Player
—		MLI	Sibiry Keita (from Aspire Academy Senegal)
—	MF	TUN	Youssef Msakni (on loan from Al-Duhail)
—		CIV	Konan N'Dri (from Aspire Academy Senegal)
—	GK	QAT	Salah Zakaria (on loan from Al-Wakrah)

Out:

No.	Pos.	Nation	Player
17	DF	CRC	Carlos Martínez (to Herediano)
26	DF	IRI	Morteza Pouraliganji (to Al-Arabi)

==== Excel Mouscron ====
In:

No.	Pos.	Nation	Player
—	FW	NGR	Taiwo Awoniyi (on loan from (England) Liverpool)
—	MF	GER	Sidney Friede (on loan from Hertha Berlin)
—	GK	SRB	Vaso Vasic (from Apollon Smyrnis)

Out:

No.	Pos.	Nation	Player
1	GK	BEL	Olivier Werner (to Seraing)
3	DF	GRE	Alexandros Katranis (loan return to Saint-Étienne)
8	FW	BEL	Luca Napoleone (to Virton)
9	FW	BEL	Yanis Mbombo (to OH Leuven)
—	MF	BEL	Noam Debaisieux (on loan to Ronse)

==== Genk ====
In:

No.	Pos.	Nation	Player
—	DF	BRA	Neto Borges (from Hammarby)
—	DF	BEL	Casper de Norre (from Sint-Truiden)
—	MF	JPN	Junya Ito (on loan from Kashiwa Reysol)
—	MF	CIV	Pierre Zebli (loan return from Ascoli)

Out:

No.	Pos.	Nation	Player
3	DF	BIH	Bojan Nastić (on loan to Oostende)
8	MF	KOS	Edon Zhegrova (on loan to Basel)
15	MF	SEN	Ibrahima Seck (on loan to Zulte Waregem)
—	MF	NED	Joep Hakkens (on loan to Lommel)

==== Gent ====
In:

No.	Pos.	Nation	Player
—	MF	UKR	Roman Bezus (from Sint-Truiden)
—	GK	BEL	Thomas Kaminski (from Kortrijk)
—	FW	NOR	Alexander Sørloth (on loan from Crystal Palace)

Out:

No.	Pos.	Nation	Player
14	FW	NGR	Taiwo Awoniyi (loan return to (England) Liverpool)
23	MF	CRO	Franko Andrijašević (on loan to Waasland-Beveren)
24	MF	BEL	Nicolas Raskin (to Standard Liège)
28	FW	BEL	Aboubakary Koita (on loan to Kortrijk)
34	MF	EGY	Ahmed Mostafa (on loan to Smouha)
91	GK	CRO	Lovre Kalinić (to Aston Villa)
—	FW	SEN	Mamadou Sylla Diallo (was on loan to Zulte Waregem, now loaned to Sint-Truiden)

==== Kortrijk ====
In:

No.	Pos.	Nation	Player
—	GK	POR	Joel Castro Pereira (on loan from (England) Manchester United)
—	FW	BEL	Aboubakary Koita (on loan from Gent)

Out:

No.	Pos.	Nation	Player
3	DF	IRI	Mohammad Naderi (on loan to Persepolis)
7	FW	BEL	Ilombe Mboyo (on loan to (Saudi Arabia) Al-Raed)
8	MF	NGR	Abdul Jeleel Ajagun (on loan to (Cyprus) Omonia)
10	MF	BRA	Kanu (to (Saudi Arabia) Al-Raed)
28	GK	BEL	Thomas Kaminski (to Gent)
—	DF	BIH	Nihad Mujakić (signed from Sarajevo, but loaned back out to former club)

==== Lokeren ====
In:

No.	Pos.	Nation	Player
—	FW	ZIM	Knowledge Musona (on loan from Anderlecht)
—	FW	CZE	Jakub Řezníček (from Viktoria Plzeň)

Out:

No.	Pos.	Nation	Player
11	FW	BEL	Bob Straetman (on loan to Virton)
20	MF	SEN	Joher Rassoul (to Adana Demirspor)
31	MF	USA	Juan Pablo Torres (to New York City)
99	FW	SRB	Đorđe Jovanović (to Cádiz)

==== Oostende ====
In:

No.	Pos.	Nation	Player
—	FW	BEL	Tom De Sutter (free agent)
—	DF	BIH	Bojan Nastić (on loan from Genk)
—	DF	NOR	Amin Nouri (on loan from Vålerenga)

Out:

No.	Pos.	Nation	Player
12	MF	ZAM	Emmanuel Banda (on loan to Béziers)

==== Sint-Truiden ====
In:

No.	Pos.	Nation	Player
18	FW	JPN	Kosuke Kinoshita (from Halmstad)
24	FW	SEN	Mamadou Sylla Diallo (on loan from Gent)
27	DF	SLO	Erik Gliha (from Aluminij)

Out:

No.	Pos.	Nation	Player
9	FW	HAI	Duckens Nazon (on loan to St Mirren)
10	MF	UKR	Roman Bezus (to Gent)
23	DF	GER	Sascha Kotysch (to OH Leuven)
24	DF	BEL	Casper de Norre (to Genk)
27	MF	BEL	Jonathan Legear (to Adana Demirspor)
77	FW	BEL	Mohamed Buya Turay (on loan to Djurgården)
—	DF	FRA	Damien Dussaut (to Dinamo București)
—	MF	BEL	Steve Ryckaert (to Eendracht Aalst)
—	MF	BEL	Iebe Swers (to Seraing)

==== Standard Liège ====
In:

No.	Pos.	Nation	Player
—	MF	CRO	Alen Halilović (on loan from Milan)
—	MF	BEL	Nicolas Raskin (from Gent)

Out:

No.	Pos.	Nation	Player
5	DF	NGR	Uche Henry Agbo (on loan to Rayo Vallecano)
11	MF	BRA	Carlinhos (on loan to Guarani)
24	MF	UKR	Valeriy Luchkevych (on loan to Oleksandriya)
26	DF	COD	Christian Luyindama (on loan to Galatasaray)

==== Waasland-Beveren ====
In:

No.	Pos.	Nation	Player
—	MF	CRO	Franko Andrijašević (on loan from Gent)
—	FW	MNE	Stefan Milošević (from Iskra Danilovgrad)

Out:

No.	Pos.	Nation	Player
2	DF	DEN	Tobias Salquist (to Lillestrøm)
12	FW	SEN	Lamine Ndao (from Gazélec Ajaccio)
18	DF	ENG	Oscar Threlkeld (on loan to Plymouth Argyle)
20	MF	BEL	Daan Heymans (on loan to Lommel)
24	MF	COM	Rafidine Abdullah (released)

==== Zulte-Waregem ====
In:

No.	Pos.	Nation	Player
—	MF	NOR	Fredrik Oldrup Jensen (loan return from Göteborg)
—	MF	BEL	Stef Peeters (on loan from Caen)
—	MF	SEN	Ibrahima Seck (on loan from Genk)
—	FW	GUI	Idrissa Sylla (from Queens Park Rangers)

Out:

No.	Pos.	Nation	Player
15	DF	NGR	Kingsley Madu (on loan to Roeselare)
19	FW	SEN	Mamadou Sylla Diallo (loan return to Gent)

=== Belgian First Division B teams ===
==== Beerschot Wilrijk ====
In:

No.	Pos.	Nation	Player
—	FW	GEO	Irakli Bugridze (from Chikhura Sachkhere)
—	MF	SWE	Diego Montiel (from Örgryte)

Out:

No.	Pos.	Nation	Player
20	MF	BEL	Faysel Kasmi (released)
22	DF	TUR	Gökhan Kardeş (on loan to Afjet Afyonspor)

==== Lommel ====
In:

No.	Pos.	Nation	Player
—	MF	NED	Joep Hakkens (on loan from Genk)
—	MF	BEL	Daan Heymans (on loan from Waasland-Beveren)

Out:

No.	Pos.	Nation	Player
8	MF	BEL	Jentl Gaethofs (on loan to Dessel Sport)
—	DF	NED	Jeffrey Ket (was on loan to Quick Boys, now sold)

==== Mechelen ====
In:

No.	Pos.	Nation	Player
—	DF	FRA	Thibault Peyre (from Union SG)

Out:

No.	Pos.	Nation	Player
15	DF	BIH	Edin Cocalić (to Akhisarspor)
18	DF	CIV	Mamadou Bagayoko (on loan to Red Star)
26	DF	BEL	Hannes Smolders (to Lierse Kempenzonen)
30	MF	FRA	Franck Berrier (retired)
37	MF	BFA	Abou Ouattara (on loan to Lille)
—	FW	GRE	Dimitris Kolovos (was on loan to (Netherlands) Willem II, now loaned to (Cyprus) Omonia)
—	FW	BEL	Jordy Peffer (was on loan to Dessel Sport, now loaned to Lyra-Lierse Berlaar)

==== OH Leuven ====
In:

No.	Pos.	Nation	Player
—	FW	FRA	Thomas Henry (from Tubize)
—	MF	CIV	Aboubakar Keita (on loan from Copenhagen)
—	DF	GER	Sascha Kotysch (from Sint-Truiden)
—	FW	BEL	Yanis Mbombo (from Excel Mouscron)

Out:

No.	Pos.	Nation	Player
8	FW	NED	Sam Hendriks (on loan to Cambuur)
9	FW	BEL	Esteban Casagolda (to Roeselare)
12	DF	FRA	Clément Fabre (to RWDM47)
29	FW	BEL	Jo Gilis (on loan to Eendracht Aalst)
32	FW	BEL	Daan Vekemans (on loan to Eendracht Aalst)
—	MF	BEL	Leo Njengo (on loan to Heist)

==== Roeselare ====
In:

No.	Pos.	Nation	Player
—	FW	BEL	Esteban Casagolda (from OH Leuven)
—	DF	NGR	Kingsley Madu (on loan from Zulte Waregem)
—	DF	NED	Darren Sidoel (on loan from Reading)
—	FW	NED	Arsenio Valpoort (from Busan IPark)

Out:

No.	Pos.	Nation	Player
8	MF	FRA	Willy Semedo (loan return to Charleroi)
15	DF	NED	Kenny van der Weg (to Ross County)
—	DF	BIH	Marko Maletić (was on loan to Dordrecht, now loaned to Paris)

==== Tubize ====
In:

No.	Pos.	Nation	Player
—	DF	IDN	Firza Andika (from PSMS)
—	MF	BEL	Enes Sağlık (on loan from Charleroi)
—	DF	FRA	Sanasi Sy (on loan from Amiens)

Out:

No.	Pos.	Nation	Player
14	FW	FRA	Thomas Henry (to OH Leuven)
19	MF	SEN	Ibrahima Ba (to Seraing)
28	DF	BEL	Marco Weymans (to Östersund)

==== Union SG ====
In:

No.	Pos.	Nation	Player
—	MF	GER	Adrian Beck (from SSV Ulm 1846)
—	DF	FRA	Ismaël Kandouss (from Dunkerque)
—	FW	USA	Chad Letts (from Atlanta United)
—	MF	FRA	Teddy Teuma (from Red Star)

Out:

No.	Pos.	Nation	Player
7	MF	FRA	Nils Bouekou (on loan to RWDM47)
29	DF	FRA	Thibault Peyre (to Mechelen)
93	MF	BEL	Julien Vercauteren (to Virton)

==== Westerlo ====
In:

No.	Pos.	Nation	Player

Out:

No.	Pos.	Nation	Player
6	DF	BEL	Simon Bammens (on loan to Tessenderlo)
