= 2019–20 Belgian Third Amateur Division =

Belgian Third Amateur Division
- Season: 2019–20
- Champions: Zelzate (A), Lyra-Lierse (B), Ganshoren (C) & Warnant (D)
- Promoted: Zelzate, Ninove, Lyra-Lierse, City Pirates, Heur-Tongeren, Ganshoren, Jette, Warnant,
- Relegated: Bornem, Oostnieuwkerke & Wingene (A); Bilzen, Helson Helchteren & Linden (B); Walhain, Kosova, Léopold Uccle & Wavre Sports (C); Ciney, Meix-devant-Virton & Spy (D)

The 2019–20 Belgian Third Amateur Division was the fourth season of the division in its current format. Mid-March all matches were temporarily postponed due to the COVID-19 pandemic in Belgium, only to be canceled permanently two weeks later, with the standing as of March 12 counting as final. As a result, Knokke, Tienen and Francs Borains were crowned champions in their respective league and were each promoted to the 2020–21 Belgian Second Amateur Division.

== Team changes ==
=== In ===
- Overijse, Brakel, Turnhout, Heur-Tongeren, City Pirates, Eppegem, Wallonia Walhain and Ciney were all relegated from the 2018–19 Belgian Second Amateur Division.
- Witgoor, Beringen, Ninove and Oostnieuwkerke were promoted as champions of the Flemish Belgian Provincial Leagues, respectively in Antwerp, Limburg, East Flanders and West Flanders.
- Saint-Ghislain, Raeren-Eynatten, Habay and Spy were promoted as champions of the Walloon Belgian Provincial Leagues, respectively in Hainaut, Liège, Luxembourg and Namur.
- Jodoigne was promoted as champion of the French speaking teams in the region matching the old Province of Brabant and Brussels.
- Linden was promoted as champion of the Flemish speaking teams in the region matching the old Province of Brabant and Brussels.
- In the province of Hainaut, Pont-à-Celles-Buzet won the play-offs to fill in the gap left by R.O.C. de Charleroi-Marchienne, which was relegated from the 2018–19 Belgian Second Amateur Division but merged with Châtelet playing in the Belgian First Amateur Division.
- Lochristi was promoted through the interprovincial play-offs on VFV side.
- Gosselies, Kosova Schaerbeek and Rochefort were promoted through the interprovincial play-offs on ACFF side.

=== Out ===
- Merelbeke was promoted after winning the 2018–19 Belgian Third Amateur Division A.
- Tienen was promoted after winning the 2018–19 Belgian Third Amateur Division B.
- Namur Fosses was promoted after winning the 2018–19 Belgian Third Amateur Division C.
- Stockay-Warfusée was promoted after winning the 2018–19 Belgian Third Amateur Division D.
- Pepingen-Halle and Zwevezele were promoted as winners of the Third Amateur Division promotion play-offs VFV.
- Onhaye and Verlaine were promoted as winners of the Third Amateur Division promotion play-offs ACFF.
- Givry was also promoted for finishing third in the Third Amateur Division promotion play-offs ACFF as an extra ACFF spot opened up due to the promotion of Visé to the 2019–20 Belgian First Amateur Division.
- Binche, Condruzien, Kampenhout, Leopoldsburg, Longlier, Racing Mechelen, Nijlen, Oostkamp, Stockel, Tamines, Ternesse, Union La Calamine, Wervik and Woluwe-Zaventem were relegated to the Belgian Provincial Leagues.

== Belgian Third Amateur Division A ==
Locations of the 2019–20 Belgian Third Amateur Division A teams

=== League table ===
Pos	Team	Pld	W	D	L	GF	GA	GD	Pts	Qualification or relegation
1	Zelzate (C, P)	24	18	4	2	57	21	+36	58	Promotion to the 2020–21 Belgian Second Amateur Division
2	Ninove (P)	24	14	5	5	52	20	+32	47	Promotion to the 2020–21 Belgian Second Amateur Division
3	Brakel (P)	24	14	4	6	47	22	+25	46	Promotion to the 2020–21 Belgian Second Amateur Division
4	Wetteren (P)	24	13	3	8	54	30	+24	42	Promotion to the 2020–21 Belgian Second Amateur Division
5	Lebbeke	24	12	6	6	30	20	+10	42	
6	Stekene	24	10	8	6	33	20	+13	38	
7	Lochristi	24	10	6	8	40	33	+7	36	
8	Lede	24	10	5	9	41	40	+1	35	
9	Eppegem	24	9	6	9	38	28	+10	33	
10	Wolvertem Merchtem	24	8	4	12	25	28	−3	28	
11	Wingene (Note: Wingene did not apply for a license and was therefore relegated to the Belgian Provincial Leagues.) (R)	24	8	4	12	24	32	−8	28	Relegation to the 2020–21 Belgian Provincial Leagues
12	Torhout	24	8	4	12	34	43	−9	28	
13	Overijse	24	7	5	12	32	42	−10	26	
14	Melsele	24	7	3	14	25	47	−22	24	
15	Oostnieuwkerke (R)	24	6	3	15	17	46	−29	21	Relegation to the 2020–21 Belgian Provincial Leagues
16	Bornem (R)	24	2	2	20	17	94	−77	8	Relegation to the 2020–21 Belgian Provincial Leagues

Source: https://www.vbal4.be/p010241z9.htm
(C) Champions; (P) Promoted; (R) Relegated

== Belgian Third Amateur Division B ==
Locations of the 2019–20 Belgian Third Amateur Division B teams

=== League table ===
Pos	Team	Pld	W	D	L	GF	GA	GD	Pts	Qualification or relegation
1	Lyra-Lierse Berlaar (C, P)	24	14	7	3	46	23	+23	49	Promotion to the 2020–21 Belgian Second Amateur Division
2	City Pirates (P)	24	15	3	6	40	29	+11	48	Promotion to the 2020–21 Belgian Second Amateur Division
3	Heur-Tongeren (P)	24	14	6	4	48	26	+22	48	Promotion to the 2020–21 Belgian Second Amateur Division
4	Houtvenne (P)	24	12	9	3	47	29	+18	45	Promotion to the 2020–21 Belgian Second Amateur Division
5	Sint-Lenaarts	24	10	8	6	57	34	+23	38	
6	Betekom	24	9	10	5	43	37	+6	37	
7	Termien	24	10	5	9	41	41	0	35	
8	Wellen	24	9	6	9	36	41	−5	33	
9	Esperanza Pelt	24	10	2	12	39	42	−3	32	
10	Zwarte Leeuw	24	9	4	11	46	38	+8	31	
11	Beringen	24	8	5	11	30	38	−8	29	
12	Witgoor	24	7	7	10	31	38	−7	28	
13	Turnhout	24	5	13	6	38	40	−2	28	
14	Bilzen (R)	24	5	5	14	37	51	−14	20	Relegation to the 2020–21 Belgian Provincial Leagues
15	Helson Helchteren (R)	24	4	6	14	26	51	−25	18	Relegation to the 2020–21 Belgian Provincial Leagues
16	Linden (R)	24	3	0	21	17	64	−47	9	Relegation to the 2020–21 Belgian Provincial Leagues

Source: https://www.vbal4.be/p010242.htm
(C) Champions; (P) Promoted; (R) Relegated

== Belgian Third Amateur Division C ==
Locations of the 2019–20 Belgian Third Amateur Division C teams

=== League table ===
Pos	Team	Pld	W	D	L	GF	GA	GD	Pts	Qualification or relegation
1	Ganshoren (C, P)	24	16	5	3	56	27	+29	53	Promotion to the 2020–21 Belgian Second Amateur Division
2	Jette (P)	24	15	3	6	45	27	+18	48	Promotion to the 2020–21 Belgian Second Amateur Division
3	Quévy-Mons	24	13	4	7	53	27	+26	43	
4	Symphorinois	24	12	4	8	35	27	+8	40	
5	Walhain (Note: After the season, Walhain was renamed to FC Golden Black and relocated to Beauvechain, but as a result had its license revoked, causing relegation to the Belgian Provincial Leagues.) (R)	24	11	7	6	42	37	+5	40	Relegation to the 2020–21 Belgian Provincial Leagues
6	CS Braine	24	11	5	8	40	38	+2	38	
7	Tournai	24	12	1	11	35	25	+10	37	
8	Saint-Ghislain	24	11	3	10	47	40	+7	36	
9	Stade Brainois	24	10	4	10	35	36	−1	34	
10	Gosselies	24	10	1	13	35	44	−9	31	
11	Manageoise	24	9	4	11	33	41	−8	31	
12	Ostiches-Ath	24	8	5	11	38	45	−7	29	
13	Pont-à-Celles-Buzet	24	8	4	12	28	42	−14	28	
14	Kosova (R)	24	6	6	12	36	55	−19	24	Relegation to the 2020–21 Belgian Provincial Leagues
15	Léopold Uccle (R)	24	4	6	14	28	44	−16	18	Relegation to the 2020–21 Belgian Provincial Leagues
16	Wavre Sports (R)	24	3	4	17	17	48	−31	13	Relegation to the 2020–21 Belgian Provincial Leagues

Source: https://www.vbal4.be/p020241.htm
(C) Champions; (P) Promoted; (R) Relegated

== Belgian Third Amateur Division D ==
Locations of the 2019–20 Belgian Third Amateur Division D teams

=== League table ===
Pos	Team	Pld	W	D	L	GF	GA	GD	Pts	Qualification or relegation
1	Warnant (C, P)	24	16	4	4	50	27	+23	52	Promotion to the 2020–21 Belgian Second Amateur Division
2	Aische	24	14	5	5	52	23	+29	47	
3	Raeren-Eynatten	24	13	5	6	58	36	+22	44	
4	Richelle	24	13	3	8	40	23	+17	42	
5	Oppagne-Wéris	24	13	3	8	45	34	+11	42	
6	Aywaille	24	10	6	8	47	49	−2	36	
7	Rochefort	24	10	4	10	49	52	−3	34	
8	Mormont	24	9	7	8	36	40	−4	34	
9	Jodoigne	24	9	6	9	44	50	−6	33	
10	Habay	23	8	7	8	47	45	+2	32.35 (Note: Habay and Meix-devant-Virton had played one match less at the time the competition was stopped, therefore their points were scaled up by a factor 24/23.)	
11	Sprimont	24	9	5	10	37	33	+4	32	
12	Herstal	24	8	7	9	42	52	−10	31	
13	Huy	24	8	3	13	27	35	−8	27	
14	Spy (R)	24	5	6	13	41	58	−17	21	Relegation to the 2020–21 Belgian Provincial Leagues
15	Meix-devant-Virton (R)	23	4	5	14	34	55	−21	17.74	Relegation to the 2020–21 Belgian Provincial Leagues
16	Ciney (R)	24	3	2	19	25	62	−37	11	Relegation to the 2020–21 Belgian Provincial Leagues

Source: https://www.vbal4.be/p020242z9.htm
(C) Champions; (P) Promoted; (R) Relegated
