= 2021–22 Belgian National Division 1 =

Belgian National Division 1
- Season: 2021–22
- Champions: Dender EH
- Promoted: Dender EH
- Relegated: La Louvière Centre
- Matches: 208

The 2021–22 Belgian National Division 1 was the sixth season of the third-tier football league in Belgium. With the previous season canceled in January 2021 after just a handful of matches played, the decision was made that no teams would be promoted or relegated, meaning that the same teams are taking part this season. The only exception is Roeselare, which defaulted and ceased to exist, making this a season with only 15 teams. Dender EH became champions on 25 May 2022 after winning their final match of the Promotion play-offs at home to Dessel, while their only remaining opponent RFC Liège, lost away to Knokke.

== Team information ==
Locations of the 2021–22 Belgian National Division 1 teams

=== Team changes ===
Only Roeselare disappeared with respect to the previous season as it ceased to exist.

== Regular season ==
=== League table ===
Pos	Team	Pld	W	D	L	GF	GA	GD	Pts	Qualification or relegation
1	RFC Liège	28	14	8	6	57	23	+34	50	Qualification for the promotion play-offs
2	Knokke	28	14	6	8	48	33	+15	48	Qualification for the promotion play-offs
3	Dessel	28	13	9	6	47	35	+12	48	Qualification for the promotion play-offs
4	Dender EH	28	12	10	6	41	30	+11	46	Qualification for the promotion play-offs
5	Olympic Charleroi CF	28	12	10	6	41	31	+10	46	
6	Patro Eisden Maasmechelen	28	12	10	6	28	21	+7	46	
7	Sint-Eloois-Winkel	28	12	8	8	40	36	+4	44	
8	Visé	28	11	6	11	45	34	+11	39	
9	Heist	28	10	9	9	41	34	+7	39	
10	Thes Sport	28	10	9	9	35	35	0	39	
11	Tienen	28	9	8	11	28	34	−6	35	
12	Rupel Boom	28	10	3	15	26	39	−13	33	
13	Francs Borains (Note: Due to the fact that Excel Mouscron (playing in the 2021–22 Belgian First Division B) was refused a professional football license and was hence directly relegated to the 2022–23 Belgian Division 2, Francs Borains did not have to take part in the final round to avoid relegation but instead kept its spot in the National Division 1. Mandel United instead took their place, thus getting a chance to avoid relegation instead of facing direct relegation as would have been the case for the 14th place finisher.)	28	8	8	12	26	29	−3	32	
14	Mandel United (O)	28	4	7	17	26	50	−24	19	Qualification for the Division 2 Promotion play-offs Final
15	La Louvière Centre (R)	28	2	3	23	13	78	−65	9	Relegation to Division 2

Source: Soccerway
Rules for classification: 1) Points; 2) Matches won; 3) Goal difference; 4) Goals scored; 5) Away goals scored; 6) Away matches won.
(O) Play-off winners; (R) Relegated

=== Results ===
Home \ Away	DEN	KNO	DES	RFC	OLC	PEM	SEW	VIS	HEI	TES	TIE	RUP	FRB	MAN	LAL
Dender EH	—	0–0	3–1	0–0	3–1	3–0	0–0	3–0	2–1	1–1	1–0	3–1	3–1	1–1	2–0
Knokke	1–0	—	1–3	2–1	3–0	1–1	4–2	2–1	1–3	2–1	1–1	1–3	1–0	5–2	5–0 (Note: Originally, the match between Knokke and La Louvière Centre had ended 0–1 in favor of La Louvière Centre. The match was later converted into a 5–0 win for Knokke as La Louvière Centre had put an ineligible player on the match sheet.)
Dessel	3–1	1–3	—	2–2	1–1	1–0	3–1	4–3	4–3	1–0	3–0	3–2	0–0	2–2	1–0
RFC Liège	0–5 (Note: Originally, the match between RFC Liège and Dender EH had ended 3–0 in favor of RFC Liège. The match was later converted into a 0–5 win for Dender EH as RFC Liège had put insufficient U21 players on the match sheet.)	3–0	0–0	—	3–1	2–0	1–1	2–3	2–0	3–1	0–0	3–1	0–0	3–1	10–0
Olympic Charleroi CF	2–2	1–2	0–0	2–2	—	0–0	2–1	1–1	1–0	1–1	1–0	0–2	1–0	2–1	2–1
Patro Eisden Maasmechelen	1–1	1–0	2–0	3–2	1–1	—	2–0	1–0	0–0	0–0	1–1	2–0	1–0	1–0	2–0
Sint-Eloois-Winkel	1–3	1–0	1–1	1–1	2–1	3–1	—	0–3	3–1	1–0	3–1	1–0	0–3	1–1	5–0 (Note: Originally, the match between Sint-Eloois-Winkel and La Louvière Centre had ended 0–1 in favor of La Louvière Centre. The match was later converted into a 5–0 win for Sint-Eloois-Winkel as La Louvière Centre had put an ineligible player on the match sheet.)
Visé	2–1	0–0	0–0	2–1	1–3	0–0	1–1	—	3–0	1–3	1–2	4–2	4–0	1–0	7–0
Heist	5–0 (Note: Originally, the match between Heist and Dender EH had ended 2–0 in favor of Heist. The match was later converted into a 5–0 win for Heist as Dender EH had put insufficient U21 players on the match sheet.)	1–1	1–1	2–1	1–1	0–2	2–2	1–0	—	0–4	2–0	1–2	1–0	4–0	3–1
Tessenderlo	1–0	0–0	1–2	0–2	0–5	1–1	2–0	1–0	2–2	—	1–1	2–0	4–3	1–1	1–4
Tienen	2–2	3–1	4–1	0–3	2–2	1–0	2–3	2–1	0–0	1–3	—	1–0	1–0	2–1	0–0
Rupel Boom	1–3	0–1	2–1	0–4	0–1	2–1	0–2	2–1	0–0	1–0	1–0	—	0–0	0–1	1–0
Francs Borains	1–1	3–0	1–0	1–0	0–2	1–1	1–2	1–1	0–0	0–1	1–0	2–0	—	2–0	2–0
Mandel United	0–2	0–4	0–3	0–1	1–3	0–1	0–0	1–2	1–2	2–3	1–0	1–1	2–2	—	4–1
La Louvière Centre	0–0	1–6	1–5	0–2	0–3	1–2	0–2	0–2	0–5 (Note: Originally, the match between La Louvière Centre and Heist had ended in a 1–1 draw. The match was later converted into a 0–5 win for Heist as La Louvière Centre had put an ineligible player on the match sheet.)	0–0	0–1	0–2	3–1	0–2	—

Source: Nationaal : 1st klasse (in Dutch)
Legend: Blue = home team win; Yellow = draw; Red = away team win.

== Promotion play-offs ==
The teams finishing in the top four positions entered the promotion play-offs. The points obtained during the regular season were halved (and rounded up) before the start of the playoff, as a result, RFC Liège started with 25 points, Knokke and Dessel with 24 points, and Dender EH with 23 points. As all teams had finished the regular season on an even number of points, no rounding occurred. Going into the playoffs, only Dender EH and RFC Liège had applied for a Belgian professional football license, meaning that only those two teams were eligible for promotion. With just one matchday to go and RFC Liège two points ahead of Dender EH, a ruling was made on an earlier complaint by the Belgian FA that RFC Liège had not put sufficient U21 players on the match sheet during their regular season match against Dender EH. The result of that match was changed from a 3–0 home win to a 0–5 forfeit loss, causing the starting points of RFC Liège to be lowered by one to 24 and those of Dender EH increased by two to 25. Going into the final match, Dender EH was suddenly leading by one point instead of being down two. RFC Liège appealed this decision, but then lost the final match (while Dender EH won) before a ruling was made, meaning the outcome didn't matter. The appeal in the end went in favor of RFC Liège, reinstating their original points.

Pos	Team	Pld	W	D	L	GF	GA	GD	Pts	Qualification	DEN	RFC	KNO	DES
1	Dender EH (C, P)	6	5	0	1	12	3	+9	38	Promotion to the 2022–23 Belgian First Division B	—	2–0	4–1	1–0
2	RFC Liège	6	4	0	2	12	7	+5	37		1–0	—	2–1	4–0
3	Knokke	6	1	2	3	10	15	−5	29		0–2	2–1	—	3–3
4	Dessel	6	0	2	4	9	18	−9	26		1–3	2–4	3–3	—

Source: Belgian First Amateur Division, Soccerway
Rules for classification: 1) Points; 2) Points without (possible) half points added due to rounding; 3) Matches won; 4) Goal difference; 5) Goals scored; 6) Away goals scored; 7) Away matches won; 8) Play-off.
(C) Champions; (P) Promoted

== Number of teams by provinces ==
Number of teams	Province or region	Team(s)
3	Antwerp	Dessel, Heist and Rupel Boom
3	Hainaut	Francs Borains, La Louvière Centre and Olympic Charleroi CF
3	West Flanders	Knokke, Mandel United and Sint-Eloois-Winkel
2	Liège	RFC Liège and Visé
2	Limburg	Patro Eisden Maasmechelen and Tessenderlo
1	East Flanders	Dender EH
1	Flemish Brabant	Tienen
