= 2018–19 Belgian Second Amateur Division =

Belgian Second Amateur Division
- Season: 2018–19
- Champions: Sint-Eloois-Winkel, Patro Eisden Maasmechelen, La Louvière Centre
- Promoted: Sint-Eloois-Winkel, Patro Eisden Maasmechelen, La Louvière Centre
- Relegated: Overijse, Brakel, Turnhout, Heur-Tongeren, City Pirates, Wallonia Walhain, Olympic Charleroi and Ciney

The 2018–19 Belgian Second Amateur Division is the third season of the division in its current format, placed at the fourth-tier of football in Belgium.

The division consists of three separate leagues, each containing 16 teams. Leagues A and B consist of teams with a license from the Voetbalfederatie Vlaanderen (VFV, the Flemish/Dutch speaking wing of the Belgian FA), while league C contains teams with a license from the Association des Clubs Francophones de Football (ACFF, the French speaking wing of the RBFA). The champions from each of the three leagues will promote to the 2019–20 Belgian First Amateur Division. The fixtures were announced in July 2018.

== Team changes ==
=== In ===
- Berchem and Patro Eisden Maasmechelen after finishing in the relegation zone in the 2017–18 Belgian First Amateur Division.
- Hamme was also relegated from the 2017–18 Belgian First Amateur Division after losing the Second Amateur Division promotion play-offs, where the team failed to regain its place in the First Amateur Division.
- Menen was promoted after winning the 2017–18 Belgian Third Amateur Division A.
- Heur-Tongeren was promoted after winning the 2017–18 Belgian Third Amateur Division B.
- La Louvière was promoted after winning the 2017–18 Belgian Third Amateur Division C.
- Tilleur was promoted after winning the 2017–18 Belgian Third Amateur Division D.
- Diegem, Dikkelvenne and Eppegem were promoted as winners of the Third Amateur Division promotion play-offs VFV.
- Couvin-Mariembourg, Francs Borains and Visé were promoted as winners of the Third Amateur Division promotion play-offs ACFF.

=== Out ===
- Rupel Boom was promoted after winning the 2017–18 Belgian Second Amateur Division A.
- Tessenderlo was promoted after winning the 2017–18 Belgian Second Amateur Division B.
- RWDM was promoted after winning the 2017–18 Belgian Second Amateur Division C.
- RFC Liège was promoted after winning the Second Amateur Division promotion play-offs.
- Bornem, La Calamine, Pepingen-Halle, Sint-Lenaarts, Sprimont Comblain, Tienen, Torhout, WS Brussels and Zwarte Leeuw were all relegated after finishing in the relegation positions the previous season.

== Belgian Second Amateur Division A ==
Locations of the 2018–19 Belgian Second Amateur Division A teams

=== League table ===
Pos	Team	Pld	W	D	L	GF	GA	GD	Pts	Qualification or relegation
1	Sint-Eloois-Winkel (C, P)	30	22	3	5	60	24	+36	69	Promotion to the 2019–20 Belgian First Amateur Division
2	Mandel United	30	19	3	8	58	30	+28	60	Qualification for the Promotion play-offs VFV (Note: Only clubs which had received a licence to play in the 2019–20 Belgian First Amateur Division were allowed to take part in the promotion playoffs. As a result, Petegem was replaced by the highest finisher not already qualified: Ronse.)
3	Petegem	30	13	10	7	55	44	+11	49	
4	Gent-Zeehaven	30	14	6	10	56	39	+17	48	Qualification for the Promotion play-offs VFV
5	Wijgmaal	30	13	8	9	52	46	+6	47	Qualification for the Promotion play-offs VFV
6	Ronse	30	12	7	11	41	35	+6	43	Qualification for the Promotion play-offs VFV
7	Menen	30	12	6	12	51	56	−5	42	
8	Londerzeel	30	11	7	12	37	35	+2	40	
9	Diegem	30	11	6	13	37	51	−14	39	
10	Westhoek	30	12	1	17	48	56	−8	37	
11	Dikkelvenne	30	10	6	14	36	66	−30	36	
12	Harelbeke	30	9	8	13	37	38	−1	35	
13	Gullegem	30	9	8	13	40	52	−12	35	
14	Eppegem (R)	30	10	4	16	36	66	−30	34	Qualification for the relegation play-offs
15	Overijse (R)	30	8	5	17	36	50	−14	29	Relegation to the 2019–20 Belgian Third Amateur Division
16	Brakel (R)	30	6	10	14	39	47	−8	28	Relegation to the 2019–20 Belgian Third Amateur Division

Source: vbal4
Rules for classification: 1) Points; 2) Goal difference; 3) Goals scored.
(C) Champions; (P) Promoted; (R) Relegated

== Belgian Second Amateur Division B ==
Locations of the 2018–19 Belgian Second Amateur Division B teams

=== League table ===
Pos	Team	Pld	W	D	L	GF	GA	GD	Pts	Qualification or relegation
1	Patro Eisden Maasmechelen (C, P)	30	19	9	2	59	26	+33	66	Promotion to the 2019–20 Belgian First Amateur Division
2	Hasselt	30	18	6	6	53	29	+24	60	Qualification for the Promotion play-offs VFV
3	Temse	30	15	6	9	60	48	+12	51	
4	Bocholt	30	15	4	11	54	38	+16	49	Qualification for the Promotion play-offs VFV
5	Berchem	30	12	7	11	54	49	+5	43	
6	Hades	30	10	13	7	50	40	+10	43	
7	Cappellen	30	11	8	11	41	41	0	41	
8	Duffel	30	10	11	9	47	40	+7	41	
9	Sint-Niklaas	30	10	10	10	48	47	+1	40	
10	Vosselaar	30	10	8	12	45	59	−14	38	
11	Hoogstraten	30	9	10	11	30	33	−3	37	
12	Hamme	30	10	6	14	44	48	−4	36	
13	Spouwen-Mopertingen	30	9	8	13	48	56	−8	35	
14	City Pirates (R)	30	9	7	14	35	42	−7	34	Qualification for the relegation play-offs
15	Turnhout (R)	30	7	8	15	38	58	−20	29	Relegation to the 2019–20 Belgian Third Amateur Division
16	Heur-Tongeren (R)	30	3	5	22	30	82	−52	14	Relegation to the 2019–20 Belgian Third Amateur Division

Source: vbal4
Rules for classification: 1) Points; 2) Goal difference; 3) Goals scored.
(C) Champions; (P) Promoted; (R) Relegated

== Belgian Second Amateur Division C ==
Locations of the 2018–19 Belgian Second Amateur Division C teams

=== League table ===
Pos	Team	Pld	W	D	L	GF	GA	GD	Pts	Qualification or relegation
1	La Louvière Centre (C, P)	30	24	5	1	83	19	+64	77	Promotion to the 2019–20 Belgian First Amateur Division
2	Visé (P)	30	19	4	7	68	36	+32	61	Qualification for the Promotion play-offs ACFF (Note: Only clubs which had received a licence to play in the 2019–20 Belgian First Amateur Division were allowed to take part in the promotion playoffs. As a result, Hamoir and Rebecq were replaced by the two highest finishers not already qualified: Tilleur and La Louvière.)
3	Hamoir	30	17	8	5	56	34	+22	59	
4	Francs Borains	30	15	7	8	59	42	+17	52	Qualification for the Promotion play-offs ACFF
5	Rebecq	30	15	6	9	60	44	+16	51	
6	Tilleur	30	14	5	11	54	45	+9	47	Qualification for the Promotion play-offs ACFF
7	La Louvière	30	12	10	8	42	30	+12	46	Qualification for the Promotion play-offs ACFF
8	Durbuy	30	12	3	15	37	50	−13	39	
9	Meux	30	9	12	9	51	51	0	39	
10	Couvin-Mariembourg	30	10	8	12	50	51	−1	38	
11	Waremme	30	10	5	15	46	53	−7	35	
12	Solières	30	8	7	15	38	56	−18	31	
13	Acren-Lessines	30	6	11	13	42	53	−11	29	
14	Walhain (R)	30	7	7	16	33	52	−19	28	Relegation to the 2019–20 Belgian Third Amateur Division
15	Olympic Charleroi (Note: Olympic Charleroi was relegated based on its finishing position, but merged after the season with Châtelet to become Olympic Charleroi Châtelet Farciennes. Châtelet was playing in the Belgian First Amateur Division and ceased to exist, while the new club took its position in the league. As a result there was de facto one team less relegating to the 2019–20 Belgian Second Amateur Division and therefore an extra team was promoted from the Belgian Provincial Leagues to fill the gap.) (R)	30	5	9	16	32	61	−29	24	Relegation to the 2019–20 Belgian Third Amateur Division
16	Ciney (R)	30	2	3	25	22	96	−74	9	Relegation to the 2019–20 Belgian Third Amateur Division

Source: vbal4
Rules for classification: 1) Points; 2) Goal difference; 3) Goals scored.
(C) Champions; (P) Promoted; (R) Relegated

== Promotion play-offs ==
=== Promotion play-offs VFV ===
The teams finishing in second place in the Second Amateur Division A and Second Amateur Division B will take part in a promotion playoff first round together with three period winners from both divisions. These 8 teams from the VFV will play the first round of a promotion-playoff, with two teams qualifying for the Promotion play-offs Final.

In division A, champions Sint-Eloois Winkel and runners-up Mandel United together won all periods. As a result, Mandel United was joined in the play-offs by the next three teams in the standings: Petegem, Gent-Zeehaven and Wijgmaal. In division B, only Hasselt and Bocholt has received a licence, with the two other spots remaining vacant. Overall this meant only six out of eight teams took part, therefore two teams were drawn to receive a bye into the second round: Gent-Zeehaven and Wijgmaal.

==== VFV Round 1 ====
11 May 2019
16:00

Mandel United	0–0 (a.e.t.)	Ronse
Vandamme (yellow card) (yellow-red card) 48'
Penalties
Pyck (penalty scored); Bailly (penalty scored); Clyncke (penalty missed); Debouver (penalty missed)	2–4	(penalty scored) Frutos; (penalty scored) Debaisieux; (penalty scored) Lekehal; (penalty scored) Thissen

12 May 2019
15:00

Bocholt	3–1 (a.e.t.)	Hasselt

Bocholt and Ronse qualified for the VFV second round promotion play-offs.

==== VFV Round 2 ====
15 May 2019
20:00

Bocholt	0–3	Wijgmaal

15 May 2019
20:00

Gent-Zeehaven	1–2	Ronse

Ronse and Wijgmaal qualified for the promotion play-offs Final.

=== Promotion play-offs ACFF ===
The team finishing in second place in the Second Amateur Division C will take part in the promotion playoff first round together with three period winners. These 4 teams will play the first round of a promotion-playoff, with the winner qualifying for the Promotion play-offs Final. As champions La Louvière Centre won all three periods, this implied that normally the teams in positions 2 through 5 would take part in the playoffs, however both Hamoir and Rebecq were replaced as they did not receive (or apply for) a licence. Tilleur and La Louvière took their spot instead.

==== ACFF Round 1 ====
5 May 2019
15:00

Francs Borains	3–1 (a.e.t.)	La Louvière
Zorbo 58'; Botoko 98'; Renquin 119'	report	Roulez 29'

5 May 2019
15:00

Tilleur	1–7	Visé
Falcione 2' (pen.)	report	Bamona 24', 48'; Nezer 46'; Perséo 66', 79', 82', 87'

The two winning teams meet each other in round 2, the losing teams remain in the Belgian Second Amateur Division.

==== ACFF Round 2 ====
12 May 2019

Francs Borains	1–2	Visé
Bruylandts 72'	report	Gendebien 43', 50'

Visé qualified for the promotion play-offs Final.

=== Promotion play-offs Final ===
The two winners of the Promotion play-offs on the VFV side (Ronse and Wijgmaal) and the winning team from the ACFF Promotion play-offs (Visé) will play a final tournament together with the team that finished in 14th place in the 2018–19 Belgian First Amateur Division (Oudenaarde). The winner of this play-off promotes to (or remains in) the 2019–20 Belgian First Amateur Division. As Oudenaarde is a team from the VFV side, there will be an extra VFV team relegating from the 2018–19 Belgian Second Amateur Division in case a team from the ACFF side (Visé) gets promoted.

==== Final Round 1 ====
19 May 2019
15:00

Ronse	0–1	Wijgmaal
		Dehond 28'

25 May 2019
18:00

Wijgmaal	1–2	Ronse
Dehond 52'		Achabar 21'; Dauchy 75'

2–2 on aggregate. Ronse won on away goals.

19 May 2019
15:00

Oudenaarde	3–2	Visé
Van Waeyenberghe; De Wilde; Vervaecke		Bamona Lubelu; Gendebien

25 May 2019
18:00

Visé	6–1	Oudenaarde
Gendebien 19'; Vaccaro 35'; Said 38' (pen.); Nezer 64', 89'; Perséo	report	Vanwildemeersch 55'

Visé won 8–4 on aggregate, Oudenaarde was relegated to the 2019–20 Belgian Second Amateur Division.

==== Final Round 2 ====
30 May 2019
15:00

Visé	0–1	Ronse
		Debaisieux 3'

2 June 2019
15:00

Ronse	1–2	Visé

2–2 on aggregate. Visé won on away goals and is promoted to the 2019–20 Belgian First Amateur Division.

== Relegation play-offs ==
The number of teams relegating from the Belgian Amateur Second Division in each wing (VFV and ACFF) depends on the number of teams of each wing relegating from the Belgian First Amateur Division.

Upon completion of the 2018–19 Belgian First Amateur Division, with three VFV teams were relegated automatically, it was already known there would be at least one additional VFV team relegating from the 2018–19 Belgian Second Amateur Division. In case Oudenaarde, taking part in the Second Amateur Division Promotion play-offs Final and also from VFV side is also relegated and is replaced by a team from ACFF side, then a second VFV team will be relegated from the 2018–19 Belgian Second Amateur Division. On ACFF side on the other hand, no extra relegations would be necessary and only the three bottom teams in division C would be relegated.

=== Relegation play-offs VFV ===
The teams finishing 14th in divisions A and B played each other in a single match to avoid relegation, with the losing team relegated and the winning team having to await the result of the Second Amateur Division Promotion play-offs Final.

12 May 2019
15:00

City Pirates	0–2	Eppegem
	Report	Rijmenams 63', 70' (pen.)

City Pirates were relegated, three weeks later Eppegem was relegated as well as ACFF team Visé got promoted, resulting in an extra team from VFV to be relegated.

=== Relegation play-offs ACFF ===
As there is only one division no playoff was organised. However due to the fact that only teams from the VFV side were being relegated from the 2018–19 Belgian First Amateur Division, no extra relegations took place.
