= Sint-Eloois-Winkel =

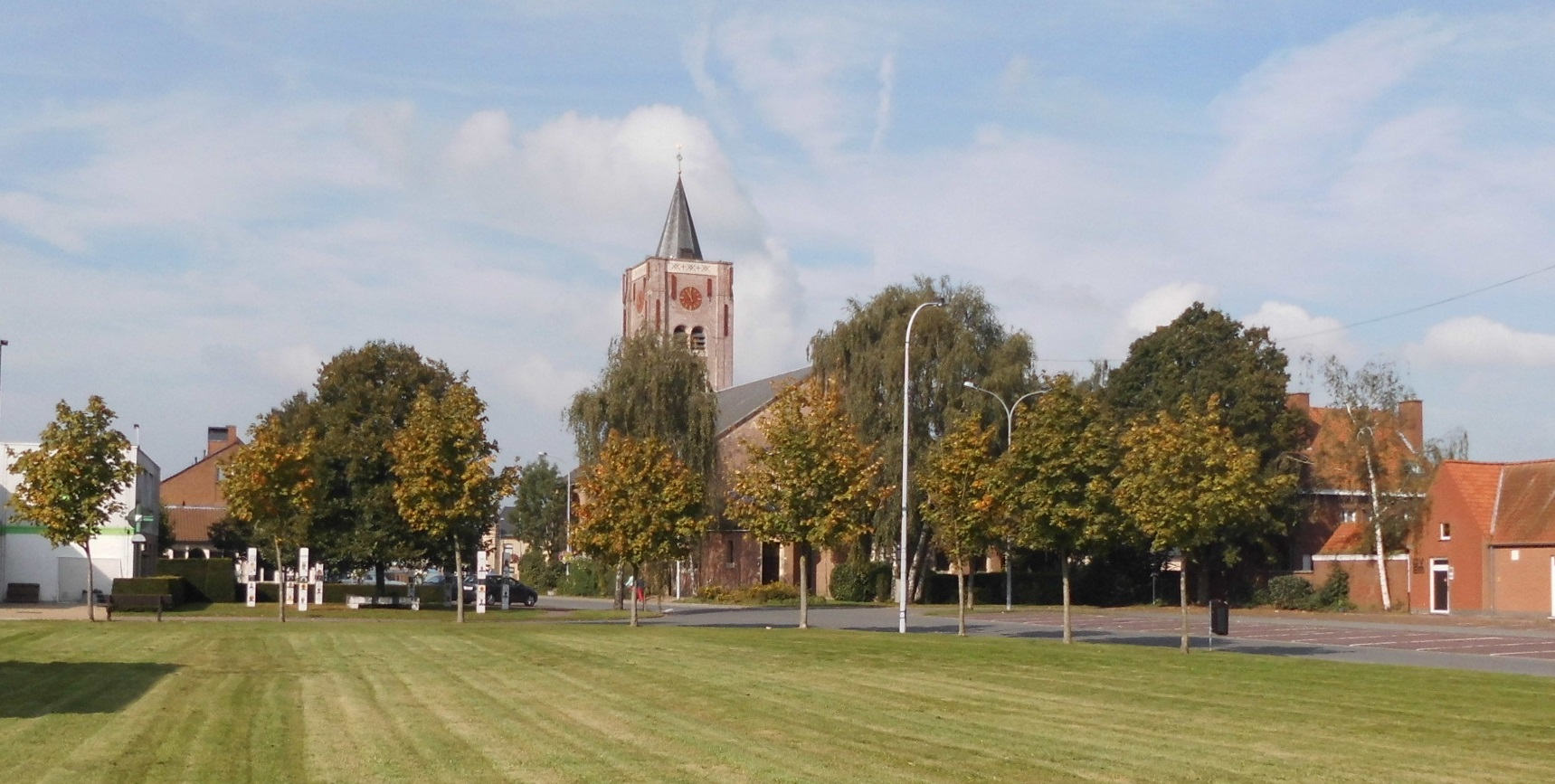

- Location in Belgium
- Coordinates: 50°52.5′N 3°10.8′E
- Country: Belgium
- Region: Flemish Region
- Community: Flemish Community
- Province: West Flanders
- Municipality: Ledegem

Area
  - Total: 8.76 km^{2} (3.38 sq mi)

Population (1 January 2006)
  - Total: 3,754
  - Density: 429/km^{2} (1,110/sq mi)
- Postal codes: 8880
- Location of Sint-Eloois-Winkel within Ledegem

Sint-Eloois-Winkel is a village in the Belgian province of West Flanders. It is a deelgemeente of the municipality of Ledegem, separated from the center of the town by highway A17. The population of Sint-Eloois-Winkel is 3800, only a few hundred less than that of central Ledegem.

== History ==
In the 18th century, Sint-Eloois-Winkel was divided by the almost as three times bigger neighbor town, Gullegem, only to get back its dependence after a few years of separation from Ledegem, since there is no own mail, library and city hall.

== Geography ==
Winkel-Saint-Éloi borders Iseghem (section of commune), Lendelede, Heule, Gullegem, Moorsele, Rollegem-Kapelle and Oekene. The town is separated from the rest of the commune by the A17 freeway.

== Sport ==
- Sint-Eloois-Winkel is well known for its annual horse races in October.
- The Sint-Eloois-Winkel Sport football club belongs to the Royal Belgian Football Association and plays in the national Belgian First Amateur Division.
