= Ledegem =

- Municipality
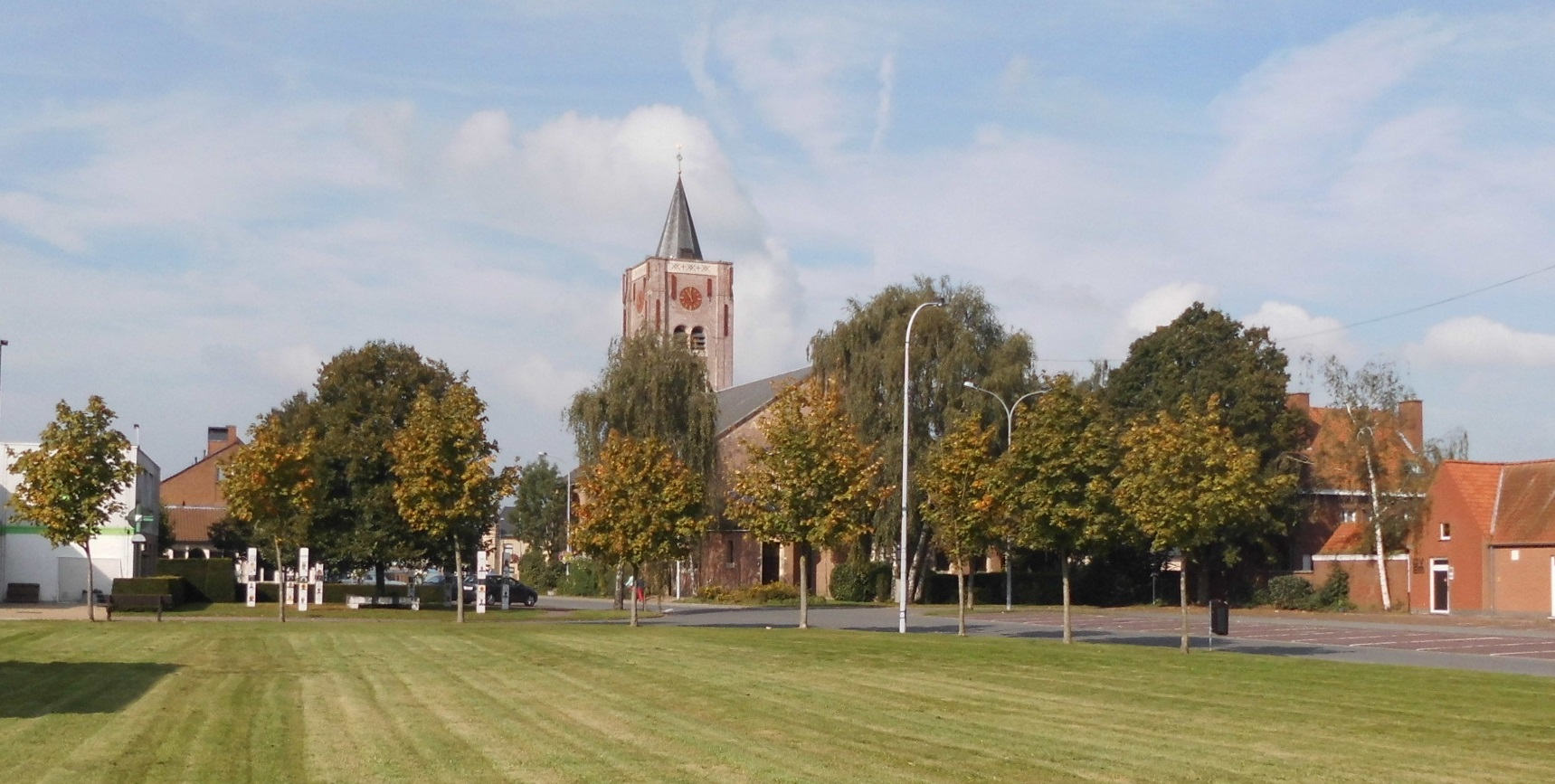
- Sint-Eloois-Winkel

- Flag Coat of arms

- Location of Ledegem in West Flanders
- Interactive map of Ledegem
- Location in Belgium
- Coordinates: 50°51′N 03°07′E
- Country: Belgium
- Community: Flemish Community
- Region: Flemish Region
- Province: West Flanders
- Arrondissement: Roeselare

Government
  - Mayor: Bart Dochy (CD&V)
  - Governing party: CD&V/VD

Area
  - Total: 24.83 km^{2} (9.59 sq mi)

Population (2018-01-01)
  - Total: 9,716
  - Density: 391.3/km^{2} (1,013/sq mi)
- Postal codes: 8880
- NIS code: 36010
- Area codes: 056
- Website: www.ledegem.be

Ledegem (Dutch pronunciation: [ˈleːdəɣɛm]; West Flemish: Léhèm) is a municipality located in the Belgian province of West Flanders. The municipality comprises the towns of Ledegem proper, Rollegem-Kapelle and Sint-Eloois-Winkel. On January 1, 2006, Ledegem had a total population of 9,306. The total area is 24.76 km^{2} which gives a population density of 376 inhabitants per km^{2}.

Hulde aan onze Helden is a monument/plaque at the Sint-Petruskerk to the Belgian soldiers and civilians from Ledegem who died in World War I.
