= Faysel Kasmi =

Belgian footballer (born 1995)

Personal information
- Date of birth: 31 October 1995 (age 31)
- Place of birth: Antwerp, Belgium
- Height: 1.68 m (5 ft 6 in)
- Position: Central midfielder

Team information
- Current team: Dessel
- Number: 7

Youth career
- 2001–2003: Rapid AC
- 2003–2009: Germinal Beerschot
- 2009–2013: Academie Jean-Marc Guillou

Senior career*
Years	Team	Apps	(Gls)
2013–2017	Lierse	49	(6)
2015	→ Standard Liége (loan)	4	(0)
2016	→ AC Omonia (loan)	2	(0)
2018	Waterford	12	(2)
2018	Beerschot	4	(0)
2019	ASV Geel	13	(5)
2019–2020	URSL Visé	18	(2)
2020–2021	Cherno More	29	(3)
2021	Dhofar Club		
2022–2023	Bregalnica Štip	13	(0)
2023–	Dessel	79	(19)
- * Club domestic league appearances and goals as of 6 May 2025

Faysel Kasmi (born 31 October 1995) is a Belgian professional footballer who plays as a midfielder for Belgian National Division 1 club Dessel.

== Club career ==
=== Early career ===
Kasmi played for Rapid AC, Germinal Beerschot and Academie Jean-Marc Guillou in his youth career before his first professional move.

=== Lierse ===
In 2014 Kasmi joined Belgian Premier League side Lierse. Kasmi made his top flight debut at 7 December 2013 against Gent in a 1–3 home defeat.

=== Standard Liége (loan) ===
In 2015 Kasmi made a surprise loan move to Standard Liège. He only made 4 league appearances before leaving.

=== AC Omonia (loan) ===
After his loan spell with Standard Liége expired Kasmi joined AC Omonia of Cyprus in 2016.

=== Waterford FC ===
In 2018 Kasmi joined League of Ireland Premier Division side Waterford on a one-year deal. Kasmi was given the number 10 shirt for the season. Kasmi made his debut for Waterford on 23 March in their 2–1 victory over Shamrock Rovers. Kasmi scored his first and second goals for Waterford in a 3–0 win over Bray Wanderers. Kasmi left Waterford in June 2018 after making 12 appearances and scoring 2 goals as he transferred to Beerschot Wilrijk for an undisclosed fee.

=== Later career ===
In June 2018 Kasmi signed for Beerschot Wilrijk. On 31 December 2018, it was revealed that Kasmi was fired from the club with immediate effect. Kasmi had tested positive for drugs a few days earlier during an alcohol check in Antwerp.

Kasmi moved to Bulgarian club Cherno More in August 2020. He then had short stints with Dhofar Club in Oman and Bregalnica Štip in North Macedonia between 2021 and 2023.

In February 2023, Kasmi joined Belgian National Division 1 club Dessel on a short-term contract after a successful trial. In May 2023, he extended his contract with Dessel until 2024.
