= 2019–20 Belgian First Amateur Division =

Belgian First Amateur Division
- Season: 2019–20
- Champions: Deinze
- Promoted: Deinze, RWD Molenbeek, Seraing, Lierse Kempenzonen
- Relegated: Tubize

The 2019–20 Belgian First Amateur Division was the fourth season of the third-tier football league in Belgium. Mid-March all matches were temporarily postponed due to the COVID-19 pandemic in Belgium, only to be canceled permanently two weeks later, with the standing as of March 12th counting as final. As a result, Deinze was crowned champions and promoted to the 2020–21 Belgian First Division B.

== Team information ==
Locations of the 2019–20 Belgian First Amateur Division teams

=== Team changes ===
==== In ====
- Tubize was relegated from the 2018–19 Belgian First Division B.
- Sint-Eloois-Winkel was promoted after winning the 2018–19 Belgian Second Amateur Division A.
- Patro Eisden Maasmechelen was promoted after winning the 2018–19 Belgian Second Amateur Division B.
- La Louvière Centre was promoted after winning the 2018–19 Belgian Second Amateur Division C.
- Visé was promoted after winning the Promotion play-offs.

==== Out ====
- Virton were promoted from the 2018–19 Belgian First Amateur Division as champions.
- Aalst, ASV Geel and Knokke finished in the relegation zone (14th through 16th) in the 2018–19 Belgian First Amateur Division and were therefore relegated to the 2019–20 Belgian Second Amateur Division.
- Oudenaarde lost the relegation play-offs and were thus also relegated.

==== Merger ====
- Châtelet merged with Royal Olympic Club de Charleroi-Marchienne to become R. Olympic Charleroi Châtelet Farciennes, known as Olympic Charleroi CF. Strictly speaking, the new club is a continuation of Royal Olympic Club de Charleroi-Marchienne rather than Châtelet, as the latter club has been dissolved.

== Regular season ==
=== League table ===
Pos	Team	Pld	W	D	L	GF	GA	GD	Pts	Qualification or relegation
1	Deinze (Note: Eligible for promotion. The deadline for requesting a license for professional football of mid-February revealed that only six teams (Deinze, La Louvière Centre, Lierse Kempenzonen, Patro Eisden Maasmechelen, RWDM47 and Seraing) had applied. Only four of those actually obtained the license. Due to one club dissolving (Lokeren) and two clubs being refused a license (Roeselare and Virton), two extra teams were promoted, the two highest finishers: Seraing and RWDM47. Eventually on 31 July 2020 it was decided that the Belgian First Division A would expand to 18 teams, meaning no team would relegate from, while two teams would be promoted into this division. As a result, two more spots opened up in the 2020–21 Belgian First Division B, which went to Lierse Kempenzonen (highest finisher with license) and the Club Brugge U23 squad.) (C, P)	24	20	2	2	52	16	+36	62	Promotion for the First Division B
2	Tessenderlo	24	12	6	6	32	23	+9	42	
3	Seraing (P)	23	11	7	5	42	27	+15	41.74 (Note: As both Seraing and RFC Liège had played one match less, their points were scaled up by a factor 24/23.)	Promotion for the First Division B
4	Heist	24	11	5	8	28	23	+5	38	
5	Patro Eisden Maasmechelen	24	10	6	8	25	23	+2	36	
6	RWDM47 (P)	24	9	7	8	26	25	+1	34	Promotion for the First Division B
7	Dender EH	24	8	7	9	36	34	+2	31	
8	Dessel	24	8	7	9	29	29	0	31	
9	Rupel Boom	24	7	10	7	35	32	+3	31	
10	Olympic Charleroi CF	24	8	6	10	29	33	−4	30	
11	Visé	24	7	9	8	32	36	−4	30	
12	RFC Liège	23	6	9	8	30	37	−7	28.17	
13	Lierse Kempenzonen (P)	24	7	5	12	27	30	−3	26	Promotion for the First Division B
14	La Louvière Centre (Note: Both La Louvière Centre and Sint-Eloois Winkel were spared of relegation despite finishing in the relegation positions, due to Lokeren being dissolved and Virton being refused a license for the first Amateur Division.)	24	6	8	10	36	49	−13	26	
15	Tubize (Note: Tubize did not meet all the criteria to obtain a license and was penalized with a 3-point penalty for next season (in the Belgian Second Amateur Division).) (R)	24	6	5	13	19	40	−21	23	Relegation to the Second Amateur Division
16	Sint-Eloois-Winkel	24	2	7	15	21	42	−21	13	

Source: vbal4
Rules for classification: 1) Points; 2) Matches won; 3) Goal difference; 4) Goals scored; 5) Away matches won; 6) Goal difference in away matches; 7) Away goals scored.
(C) Champions; (P) Promoted; (R) Relegated

=== Results ===
Home \ Away	DEI	DEN	DES	HEI	LAL	LIE	OLC	PEM	RFC	RUP	RWD	SER	SEW	TES	TUB	VIS
Deinze	—	2–0	0–0	3–2	3–1	1–0	– (Note: Matches cancelled due to coronavirus pandemic.)	3–0	5–0	–	–	2–1	3–2	2–0	1–0	4–1
Dender EH	1–3	—	1–0	–	1–2	2–2	2–1	0–0	1–1	2–2	0–1	0–1	–	2–2	3–0	–
Dessel	0–4	–	—	1–1	5–2	2–1	2–1	0–1	–	4–0	–	1–1	1–1	0–2	1–0	2–0
Heist	0–3	0–2	–	—	1–1	0–2	4–0	0–0	–	1–0	0–0	–	1–0	0–1	1–1	1–0
La Louvière Centre	1–2	0–4	3–6	–	—	2–1	–	0–0	3–2	3–3	–	1–1	1–1	2–1	1–2	4–0
Lierse Kempenzonen	2–0	1–2	–	0–1	2–1	—	–	0–1	1–1	–	0–1	1–3	2–0	1–0	2–0	1–2
Olympic Charleroi CF	1–1	–	2–1	2–3	1–1	1–1	—	4–1	3–4	1–0	0–0	–	–	0–1	3–0	1–0
Patro Eisden Maasmechelen	0–1	–	–	0–1	1–1	1–0	2–0	—	2–1	–	2–0	1–1	2–1	1–0	3–0	3–1
RFC Liège	1–3	4–2	0–0	0–3	2–1	0–0	1–1	3–1	—	2–3	1–0	1–1	2–1	–	–	–
Rupel Boom	0–2	1–1	0–0	0–1	–	2–2	2–0	1–0	–	—	0–0	2–0	–	0–0	5–0	1–1
RWDM47	1–2	0–2	1–0	2–0	0–1	–	2–1	2–1	2–2	3–3	—	–	3–1	–	0–1	2–2
Seraing	1–0	1–1	3–0	2–1	5–2	5–3	1–2	–	– (Note: Match was stopped at a score of 1–2 due to a regional power outage with 20 minutes remaining. As the home club was not to blame, the match was originally scheduled to be replayed entirely, but in the end got cancelled as well.)	4–1	0–1	—	1–1	1–3	–	–
Sint-Eloois-Winkel	1–2	4–1	2–1	1–3	–	0–2	0–1	1–1	0–0	1–5	1–2	0–4	—	–	–	1–1
Tessenderlo	–	0–3	1–1	–	–	2–0	3–1	2–1	1–1	1–0	2–1	0–1	2–1	—	2–0	2–2
Tubize	–	3–2	2–0	0–2	1–1	–	1–2	–	1–0	2–2	2–1	1–2	0–0	0–2	—	1–1
Visé	–	3–1	0–1	2–1	4–1	–	0–0	–	2–1	1–2	1–1	2–2	1–0	2–2	1–1	—

Updated to match(es) played on completed. Source: Nationaal : 1st klasse (in Dutch)
Legend: Blue = home team win; Yellow = draw; Red = away team win.

== Number of teams by provinces ==
Number of teams	Province or region	Team(s)
4	Antwerp	Dessel, Heist, Lierse Kempenzonen and Rupel Boom
3	Liège	RFC Liège, Seraing and Visé
2	East Flanders	Dender EH and Deinze
2	Limburg	Patro Eisden Maasmechelen and Tessenderlo
2	Hainaut	La Louvière Centre and Olympic Charleroi Châtelet Farciennes
1	Brussels	RWDM47
1	Walloon Brabant	Tubize
1	West Flanders	Sint-Eloois-Winkel
