= Wavre Sports FC =

Former Belgian football club

Wavre
- Full name: Wavre Sports FC
- Founded: 1944
- Dissolved: 2020
- Ground: Stade Justin Peeters, Wavre
- Capacity: 1,000
- 2019–20: Belgian Third Amateur Division A, 16th
Home colours	Away colours

Wavre Sports FC was a Belgian football club from Wavre in Walloon Brabant. Founded in Jette, Brussels on 26 June 1945 as Racing Club Jettois under matricule 4549, it merged in 1970 with Royal Stade de Bruxelles to become Racing Jet de Bruxelles, played two short spells in the Belgian First Division in the mid-1980s, and relocated to Wavre in 1988 as Racing Jet Wavre. After three further decades in the lower divisions of Belgian football, it was renamed Wavre Sports FC in 2018 and ceased activities at the end of the 2019–20 season.

== History ==
=== Brussels years (1945–1988) ===
The club was founded in Jette, in the northern Brussels agglomeration, shortly after the World War II; while later club documents date the founding to 1944, the earliest verifiable record places it at 26 June 1945. It joined the Royal Belgian Football Association (KBVB) on registration as Racing Club Jettois and was assigned matricule 4549. In 1970, the club merged with neighbouring Royal Stade de Bruxelles and was renamed Racing Jet de Bruxelles, reaching the Belgian Second Division in 1979 and finishing fifth in its first season at the second tier.

The club reached the First Division for the first time in 1984–85, having been promoted via the Second Division final round the previous spring. Its opening top-flight match was played at the Heysel Stadium against Anderlecht and ended in a 9–2 defeat; the season concluded with the team last and immediately relegated. Two years later, with Raymond Goethals as manager working alongside the young head coach Daniel Renders, Racing Jet won the Second Division final round again and returned to the First Division. Goethals secured the signing of the Romanian international László Bölöni for the 1987–88 campaign before leaving to manage Anderlecht; without him, and hampered by injuries, Racing Jet finished bottom and were relegated. Citing the difficulty of building a financial base in football-saturated Brussels, the club's directors moved it to Wavre at the end of the 1987–88 season.

=== Wavre era (1988–2020) ===
The 1988 relocation involved a simultaneous merger with the original Wavre Sports (matricule 79); the older club's youth and amateur structure went on to merge with Royale Union Limaloise to form Royal Wavre Limal, while the Racing Jet matricule 4549 took possession of the Stade Justin Peeters under the name Racing Jet Wavre. The club narrowly missed promotion in its first season back in the Second Division before declining through the national divisions over the following decades and eventually falling into the provincial leagues. It was renamed Wavre Sports FC after the 2017–18 season, controversially reusing the historical name of the older Wavre club.

The 2019–20 Belgian Third Amateur Division A season, interrupted in March 2020 by the COVID-19 pandemic, saw Wavre Sports finish 16th and last; the club did not re-form for the following provincial season and was dissolved.

== Historical names ==
- 1944 – Racing de Jette
- 1970 – Racing Jet Bruxelles
- 1988 – Racing Jet Wavre
- 2018 – Wavre Sports FC

== Stadium ==
The club played at the Stade Justin Peeters in Wavre from 1988, named for the socialist mayor of Wavre between 1953 and 1976. After the club's dissolution the ground was used only occasionally by the local amateur side Wavre-Limal, and in September 2025 it was renamed Belfius Hockey Arena ahead of the 2026 Men's FIH Hockey World Cup, for which Wavre is a co-host city alongside Amsterdam. Renovation expanded its base capacity to 4,000, with three temporary stands taking the total to 10,000 for the tournament.

== Honours ==
- Belgian Second Division final round
  - Winners (2): 1983–84, 1986–87
