= Noam Debaisieux =

Belgian footballer

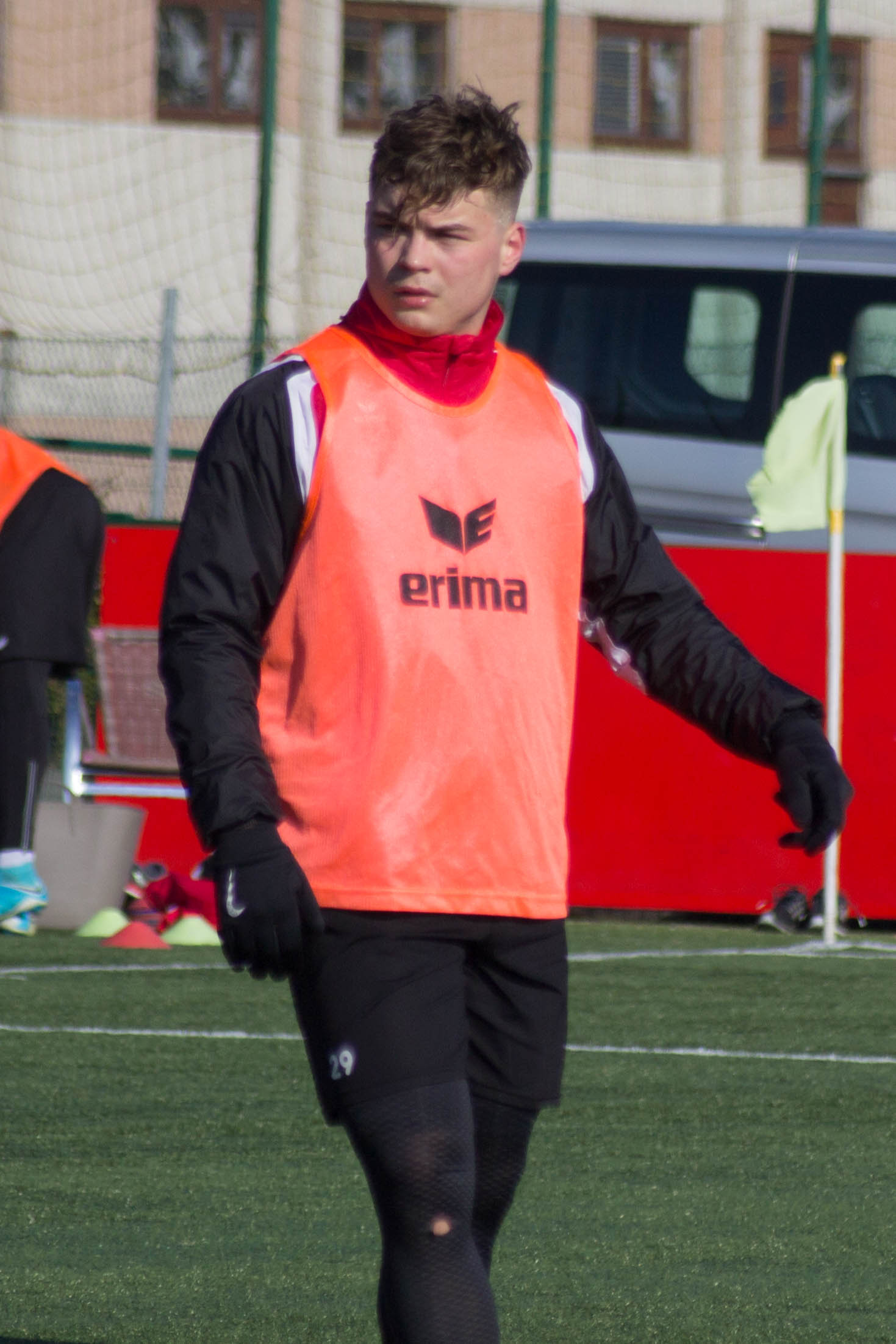

Personal information
- Full name: Noam Debaisieux
- Date of birth: 15 December 1999 (age 26)
- Place of birth: Belgium
- Height: 1.80 m (5 ft 11 in)
- Position: Attacking midfielder

Team information
- Current team: Royal Dottignies

Youth career
- Royal Excel Mouscron

Senior career*
Years	Team	Apps	(Gls)
2017–2019	Royal Excel Mouscron	14	(0)
2019	→ Ronse (loan)		
2019–2020	Ronse		
2020–	Royal Dottignies		
- * Club domestic league appearances and goals as of 13:02, 29 April 2019 (UTC)

Noam Debaisieux (born 15 December 1999) is a Belgian professional footballer who plays as an attacking midfielder for Royal Dottignies.

== Professional career ==
Debaisieux made his professional debut for Royal Excel Mouscron on 14 May 2017 in a playoff against K.R.C. Genk. On 21 June 2017, Debaisieux signed his first professional contract with Royal Excel Mouscron.

Debaisieux wasn't a part of the first team Royal Excel Mouscron since the beginning of the 2018/19 season and therefore, he was loaned out on 18 January 2019 to K.S.K. Ronse for the rest of the season. He stayed at the club at the end of the loan spell.

In February 2020 it was confirmed, that Debaisieux would join Royal Dottignies Sport in July 2020.
