= Olympia SC Wijgmaal =

Association football club in Brakel, Belgium

Olympia Wijgmaal
- Full name: Koninklijke Olympia Sportkring Club Wijgmaal
- Short name: Olympia Wijgmaal
- Founded: 1926; 100 years ago
- Ground: Pastoor Bellonstraat, Wijgmaal
- Chairman: Leon Van Den Borre
- Head coach: Steven De Pauw
- League: Belgian Division 2
- Website: http://www.olympiawijgmaal.be/
Home colours

Koninklijke Olympia Sportkring Club Wijgmaal is a Belgian football club based in the town of Wijgmaal, registered with the Belgian FA under matricule 1349. The full name of the club is Koninklijke Olympia Sportkring Club Wijgmaal (Royal Olympia Sports Club Wijgmaal) and it has blue and white as club colours. The club has played for over three decades at the national level.

== History ==
In the years prior to World War I, youngsters in Wijgmaal occasionally played football on Sunday, coached by vicar Van Hees, and this team joined the Catholic Sports Association. When Van Hees was gone, it was decided to continue his efforts, leading to the foundation of Olympia Sporting Club Wijgmael, which joined the Belgian FA in 1928 and was awarded matricule number 1349. The club started in the Belgian Provincial Leagues where it would remain for the first few decades. A first title was obtained in 1930–31 and some seasons later the club moved up to the second provincial level and just before World War II even to the first provincial level, after another title.

The club remained one of the better teams at the highest provincial level until 1949 when it relegated, followed by another relegation the season after. It took until 1963 for the club to reach the top provincial level again and eventually in 1966 the club managed to promote to the national level for the first time in its existence. That season the club also obtained the royal designation, changing its name to Koninklijke Olympia Sporting Club Wijgmaal. The club managed to immediately win its series in the Belgian Fourth Division, resulting in a second consecutive promotion, now into the Belgian Third Division. The club lasted only two seasons at this level but would then become a stable team in the Belgian Fourth Division, where it remained for 24 consecutive seasons, until 1990 when it relegated again.

In the meantime, the club had merged in 1986 with Sportkring Delle, a team from a commune within the neighbouring municipality of Herent. The club continued playing in Wijgmaal, under the same matricule number, but altering its name slightly to Koninklijke Olympia Sportkring Club Wijgmaal

After the relegation, the club spent 16 seasons in the provincial leagues, mostly at the highest level, before finally returning to the Belgian Fourth Division in 2006. With the exception of one season at the Belgian Third level in 2011–12, the club has remained at the fourth level of the Belgian football pyramid where it currently still resides.
