= Sint-Eloois-Winkel Sport =

Association football club in Sint-Eloois-Winkel, Belgium

- Full name: Koninklijke Voetbalclub Sint-Eloois-Winkel Sport
- Founded: 1940; 86 years ago
- Ground: Sportpark Terschueren, Sint-Eloois-Winkel
- Capacity: 4,000
- Final season; 2023–24: 11th in Belgian Division 1 (folded)
- Website: https://winkelsport.be/home
Home colours

Sint-Eloois-Winkel Sport is a Belgian football club based in Sint-Eloois-Winkel, West Flanders. The club play their home games at Sportpark Terschueren. The club colours, reflected in their crest and kits, are red and black. Formed in 1940, the club has spent most of its existence in the provincial tiers. It has matricule number 4408, and is part of the Royal Belgian Football Association (KBVB).

The club's first team disbanded at the end of the 2023–24 season where they competed in the Belgian National Division 1, the highest amateur football division and third tier of Belgian football. With the departure of chairman and main sponsor Geert Cool, the club could no longer sustain itself financially. Moving forward, only the second team in the Third Provincial C division and its youth teams remained.

== History ==
The club was founded as Voetbalclub Sint-Eloois-Winkel Sport in 1940, during the Second World War. Initially, they played in the Catholic Flemish Sports Association, a league that competed with the Royal Belgian Football Association (KBVB). In 1946, they joined the KBVB as Sint-Eloois-Winkel Sport and started out in the Belgian Provincial Leagues. The club moved through the provincial leagues and from 1964 to 1983 they played in Eerste Provinciale – the highest provincial tier – for 19 consecutive years. After that, however, the club declined somewhat, until they even had to fight for retention in the Third Provincial division. In the mid-90s, however, the club would rise through the ranks again. At its 50th anniversary in 1991, the club became "royal", adding koninklijke to their name.

In 1995, Winkel Sport won the title of the Third Provincial and was promoted to Second Provincial again. Two years later, in 1997, they could also return to Eerste Provinciale. Another two years later, in 1999, they also took second place in Eerste Provinciale, again behind Wervik. However, due to the merger of KSK Roeselare and KFC Roeselare to K.S.V. Roeselare in the national division, an extra spot became available, and Sint-Eloois-Winkel Sport were able to promote through this. For the first time the club reached one of the national tiers.

Sint-Eloois-Winkel made its debut in Belgian Fourth Division with a fifth place. The second season was more difficult, but in its third season in Fourth Division, the club finished third and was allowed to go to the play-offs for the first time. Verbroedering Meerhout proved too strong there. The club also held its own in the following seasons and usually ended in upper half of the league table. In 2007, Winkel Sport finished second and therefore qualified for play-offs again. After a win against K. Lyra, they were eliminated this time by La Louvière. In 2008, they ended up at the top again. Winkel Sport had finished with the same number of points as SC Wielsbeke, but with a worse goal difference. Wielsbeke thus became champion, Sint-Eloois-Winkel missed out on the title, but again qualified for play-offs. After a win over Sporting Hasselt, however, they were also eliminated there again, this time by RFC Union La Calamine. In 2008–09, Winkel Sport competed for the title for the third year in a row, but for the third time in a row they ended in second place. And as with the previous years, this time too, it was not possible to force promotion through the play-offs. This time, the team was eliminated by Sporting Hasselt.

In 2014, the club won in the final play-off round against OMS Ingelmunster and KVK Westhoek, but lost to KSC Grimbergen. However, due to the bankruptcy of RWDM Brussels, an extra place in Belgian Third Division became available, so that Sint-Eloois-Winkel Sport reached promotion nonetheless.

In April 2019, Sint-Eloois-Winkel Sport won promotion to the Belgian First Amateur Division after finishing first in their division.

In October 2023, it was announced that the first team of Sint-Eloois-Winkel Sport would disband at the end of the season. The team played in the Belgian National Division 1, the highest amateur football division, and the third tier of Belgian football. With the departure of chairman and main sponsor Geert Cool, the club could no longer sustain itself financially. Moving forward, Sint-Eloois-Winkel Sport would continue with its second team in the Third Provincial C division and its youth teams.

== Honours ==
- Belgian Second Amateur Division:
  - Winners (1): 2018–19
- West Flanders 1 Provinciaal:
  - Runners-up (1): 1998–99
- West Flanders 2 Provinciaal:
  - Runners-up (1): 1996–97
- West Flanders 3 Provinciaal:
  - Winners (1): 1994–95

== See also ==
- Category:Sint-Eloois-Winkel Sport players
