= Royal Châtelet S.C. =

Sporting Châtelet
- Full name: Royal Châtelet-Farciennes Sporting Club
- Nickname: Les Loups
- Founded: 1926; 100 years ago
- Dissolved: 2019; 7 years ago
- Ground: Stade des Marais, Farciennes
- Capacity: 5,000

Royal Châtelet-Farciennes Sporting Club was a defunct Belgian football team from Châtelet, Hainaut, Belgium, last playing in the 2018–19 Belgian First Amateur Division before merging with R.O.C. de Charleroi-Marchienne to become R. Olympic Charleroi Châtelet Farciennes.

== History ==
The club was founded in 1926. After winning the Belgian Division 2 in 2017, Royal Châtelet was promoted to the Belgian First Amateur Division, the third tier of Belgian football, for the first time in its history in 2017–18.

The club, as Royal Châtelet ceased operations in 2019, following the merger with R.O.C. de Charleroi-Marchienne.

== Honours ==
- Belgian Second Amateur Division (1): 2016–17
- Coupe du Hainaut (2): 1937, 2001
