= URSL Visé =

Former Belgian football club

- Full name: Union Royale Sportive Lixhe Visé
- Founded: 22 October 1927; 98 years ago
- Dissolved: 2024; 2 years ago
- Ground: Stade de la Cité de l'Oie, Visé
- Capacity: 5,460
- 2023–24: Belgian National Division 1, 17th
Home colours	Away colours

Union Royale Sportive Lixhe Visé, commonly known as URSL Visé, was a Belgian football club based in Visé, Liège Province. Founded on 22 October 1927 as Union Sainte-Brigitte Football Club, it played under matricule 1352 of the Royal Belgian Football Association (KBVB). Following six consecutive promotions between 2013 and 2019, the club reached the third-tier Belgian National Division 1 for the first time in its history; in May 2024, following the departure of its Jamaican investors and the refusal of its national-football licence, it withdrew from competitive football and did not field a senior side in the 2024–25 season.

== History ==
The club was formed on 22 October 1927 when two clubs not affiliated to the Royal Belgian Football Association (KBVB) (Bleus clairs and Bleus foncés) merged and continued under the name Union Sainte-Brigitte Football Club. On 21 November 1928, the club joined the KBVB.

On 6 August 1929, the name was changed to Union Sportive Lixhe. On 17 May 1945 the name was changed again: they would continue under the name Sporting Union Lixhe-Lanaye. On 5 November 1953, the club was given royal status and its name was changed to Union Royal Sports Lixhe-Lanaye on 26 November 1953.

For a long time, the club spent an anonymous existence in the regional tiers of the Liège Province. Until the 2013–14 season, where the club won four consecutive promotions – three championships and one play-offs win – to reach the Belgian Third Division.

After the bankruptcy of local rivals CS Visé in 2014, the club was relocated to the main stadium in Visé, the 5,460 capacity Stade de la Cité de l'Oie. In order to give this move more weight, the name was changed to Union Royale Sportive Lixhe Visé on 1 July 2016. In 2017, the club was promoted from the provincial series to the Belgian Third Division and finished second behind FC Tilleur, thereby promoting to the second amateur division. The following year, they again entered the play-offs for promotion, in which they beat Oudenaarde and Ronse, which secured their sixth promotion in a row. Thereby, URSL Visé would compete in the highest amateur division, the Belgian third-tier First Amateur Division for the first time in club history for the 2019–20 season.

The club competed in the third tier from the 2019–20 season onwards. In December 2019, Visé signed the former Belgium international Jonathan Legear, who was made captain. José Riga coached the club for most of this period, joining as sporting director in October 2019 and serving as head coach from 2019 to May 2022 and again from November 2022 until the club's dissolution.

In summer 2023, the Jamaican-registered Phoenix All Stars Football Academy acquired a 50 % shareholding in the club, with the academy's Shelley McFarlane joining Guy Thiry as co-president; several Jamaican players joined the squad. The investors withdrew abruptly in early 2024, leaving the club with debts of several hundred thousand euros and unable to compile a financial dossier in time for the 1 April 2024 licence deadline. Visé were subsequently denied a licence for the renamed top amateur tier, the D1 ACFF.

The team finished 19th of 20 in the 2023–24 Belgian National Division 1, its final match a 0–0 draw against RAAL on 11 May 2024. A scheduled appeal to the Belgian Court of Arbitration for Sport on 22 May 2024 was abandoned by the club for lack of new evidence, ending its time in national football. On 28 June 2024 the club confirmed it would not enter the provincial competition either, triggering a cascade of replacement promotions in the provincial pyramid and the club was subsequently dissolved.

== Honours ==
- Belgian Second Amateur Division
  - Runners-up (1): 2018–19
- Belgian Third Amateur Division
  - Runners-up (1): 2017–18
- Première Provinciale Liège
  - Runners-up (1): 2016–17
- Deuxième Provinciale Provinciale Liège
  - Winners (1): 2015–16
- Troisième Provinciale Provinciale Liège
  - Winners (1): 2014–15
- Quatrième Provinciale Provinciale Liège B
  - Winners (1): 2013–14
