= 2016–17 in Belgian football =

Football in Belgium
- Season: 2016–17

Men's football
- First Division A: Anderlecht
- First Division B: Antwerp
- First Amateur Division: Beerschot Wilrijk
- Second Amateur Division: Knokke (A), Berchem Sport (B) and Châtelet (C)
- Third Amateur Division: Ingelmunster (A), Turnhout (B), RWDM47 (C) and Durbuy (D)
- Cup: Zulte Waregem
- Super Cup: Club Brugge

The following article is a summary of the 2016–17 football season in Belgium, which is the 114th season of competitive football in the country and runs from July 2016 until June 2017.

== National teams ==
=== Belgium national football team ===
The Belgium national football team started their qualification campaign, winning 5 matches easily but needing a last minute equalizer at home against Greece to remain undefeated. They were less successful in friendlies, with two draws and one loss.

==== 2018 FIFA World Cup qualification ====
6 September 2016	Cyprus	0–3	Belgium	GSP Stadium, Nicosia
20:45 (21:45 UTC+3)		Report (FIFA); Report (UEFA)	R. Lukaku 13', 61'; Carrasco 81'	Attendance: 12,029; Referee: Felix Zwayer (Germany)

7 October 2016	Belgium	4–0	Bosnia and Herzegovina	King Baudouin Stadium, Brussels
20:45 (20:45 UTC+2)	Spahić 26' (o.g.); Hazard 29'; Alderweireld 60'; R. Lukaku 79'	Report (FIFA); Report (UEFA)		Attendance: 42,653; Referee: Martin Atkinson (England)

10 October 2016	Gibraltar	0–6	Belgium	Estádio Algarve, Faro/Loulé (Portugal) (Note: Gibraltar play their home matches at Estádio Algarve, Faro/Loulé in Portugal instead of their regular stadium, Victoria Stadium, in Gibraltar.)
20:45 (19:45 UTC+1)		Report (FIFA); Report (UEFA)	Benteke 1', 43', 56'; Witsel 19'; Mertens 51'; Hazard 79'	Referee: Paweł Raczkowski (Poland)

13 November 2016	Belgium	8–1	Estonia	King Baudouin Stadium, Brussels
20:45 (20:45 UTC+1)	Meunier 8'; Mertens 16', 68'; E. Hazard 25'; Carrasco 62'; Klavan 64' (o.g.); R. Lukaku 83', 88'	Report (FIFA); Report (UEFA)	Anier 29'	Attendance: 37,128; Referee: Alexandru Tudor (Romania)

25 March 2017	Belgium	1–1	Greece	King Baudouin Stadium, Brussels
20:45 (20:45 UTC+1)	R. Lukaku 89'	Report (FIFA); Report (UEFA)	Mitroglou 46'	Referee: Felix Brych (Germany)

9 June 2017	Estonia	0–2	Belgium	A. Le Coq Arena, Tallinn
20:45 (21:45 UTC+3)		Report (FIFA); Report (UEFA)	Mertens 31'; Chadli 86'	Attendance: 10,176; Referee: John Beaton (Scotland)

==== Friendlies ====
1 September 2016 Friendly	Belgium	0–2	Spain	Brussels, Belgium
20:45 (20:45 UTC+2)		Report	Silva 34', 62' (pen.)	Stadium: King Baudouin Stadium; Attendance: 28,000; Referee: Benoît Bastien (France)

9 November 2016 Friendly	Netherlands	1–1	Belgium	Amsterdam, Netherlands
20:45 CEST (UTC+02:00)	Klaassen 38' (pen.)	Report	Carrasco 82'	Stadium: Amsterdam Arena

28 March 2017 Friendly	Russia	3–3	Belgium	Sochi, Russia
18:00 CEST (UTC+02:00)	Vasin 3'; Miranchuk 74'; Bukharov 90+2'	Report	Mirallas 17' (pen.); Benteke 42', 45'	Stadium: Fisht Olympic Stadium; Attendance: 45,000; Referee: Szymon Marciniak (Poland)

== Men's football ==
=== League season ===
==== Promotion and relegation ====
The following teams had achieved promotion or suffered relegation going into the 2016–17 season.

League	Promoted to league	Relegated from league
First Division A	Eupen	OH Leuven
First Division B	none	WS Brussels; Dessel Sport; Seraing United; Virton; ASV Geel; Deinze; Patro Eisden Maasmechelen; Heist; Coxyde

==== Belgian First Division A ====
Anderlecht secured its 34th championship, denying Club Brugge a second consecutive title. Oostende qualified for the first time for European football while Westerlo was relegated at the bottom end of the table.

===== Regular season =====
Pos	Team	Pld	W	D	L	GF	GA	GD	Pts	Qualification or relegation
1	Anderlecht	30	18	7	5	67	30	+37	61	Qualification for the championship play-offs
2	Club Brugge	30	18	5	7	56	24	+32	59	Qualification for the championship play-offs
3	Zulte Waregem	30	15	9	6	49	38	+11	54	Qualification for the championship play-offs
4	Gent	30	14	8	8	45	29	+16	50	Qualification for the championship play-offs
5	Oostende	30	14	8	8	52	37	+15	50	Qualification for the championship play-offs
6	Charleroi	30	13	10	7	34	29	+5	49 (Note: The match between Charleroi and Standard Liège on 4 December was stopped after 68 minutes after supporters from both teams had been throwing objects and fireworks onto the pitch, with Standard leading 3–1. On 15 December, the Royal Belgian Football Association decided to award zero points to both teams. Standard appealed this decision, however the Belgian arbitration court for sports finally ruled that the decision would stand, meaning the 3–1 score was kept but no points were awarded. Standard Liège was however relieved of the penalty to play one match behind closed doors.)	Qualification for the championship play-offs
7	Mechelen	30	14	6	10	41	36	+5	48	Qualification for the Europa League play-offs
8	Genk	30	14	6	10	40	35	+5	48	Qualification for the Europa League play-offs
9	Standard Liège	30	10	12	8	47	38	+9	39	Qualification for the Europa League play-offs
10	Kortrijk	30	8	7	15	38	55	−17	31	Qualification for the Europa League play-offs
11	Lokeren	30	7	10	13	24	34	−10	31	Qualification for the Europa League play-offs
12	Sint-Truiden	30	8	6	16	35	48	−13	30	Qualification for the Europa League play-offs
13	Eupen	30	8	6	16	40	64	−24	30	Qualification for the Europa League play-offs
14	Waasland-Beveren	30	7	9	14	28	43	−15	30	Qualification for the Europa League play-offs
15	Excel Mouscron	30	7	3	20	29	53	−24	24	Qualification for the Europa League play-offs
16	Westerlo (R)	30	5	8	17	33	65	−32	23	Relegation to First Division B

Source: Belgian First Division A (in Dutch), Soccerway
Rules for classification: 1) Points; 2) Matches won; 3) Goal difference; 4) Goals scored; 5) Away goals scored; 6) Away matches won; 7) Play-off.
(R) Relegated

===== Championship play-offs =====
Pos	Team	Pld	W	D	L	GF	GA	GD	Pts	Qualification	AND	CLU	GNT	OOS	CHA	ZWA
1	Anderlecht (C)	10	6	3	1	14	6	+8	52	Qualification for the Champions League group stage	—	2–0	0–0	3–2	0–1	2–0
2	Club Brugge	10	4	3	3	16	14	+2	45	Qualification for the Champions League third qualifying round	1–1	—	2–1	3–1	1–1	2–1
3	Gent	10	4	4	2	16	11	+5	41	Qualification for the Europa League third qualifying round	0–0	2–1	—	1–1	1–1	5–2
4	Oostende (O)	10	3	3	4	14	17	−3	37	Qualification for the Europa League play-off final	0–1	2–1	4–3	—	1–0	1–1
5	Charleroi	10	2	4	4	10	13	−3	35		1–3	1–3	0–1	1–1	—	2–0
6	Zulte Waregem	10	1	3	6	12	21	−9	33	Qualification for the Europa League group stage (Note: Zulte Waregem qualified for the Europa League group stage by winning the 2016–17 Belgian Cup.)	1–2	2–2	0–2	3–1	2–2	—

Source: Soccerway
Rules for classification: 1) Points; 2) Points without (possible) half points added due to rounding; 3) Matches won; 4) Goal difference; 5) Goals scored; 6) Away goals scored; 7) Away matches won; 8) Play-off.
(C) Champions; (O) Play-off winners

==== Belgian First Division B ====
In the opening tournament, Roeselare edged out Lierse to assure its place in the promotion play-offs. In the closing tournament, Lierse competed with Antwerp for the lead, with Lierse being overtaken by Antwerp on the final matchday. Therefore, Lierse, who scored the most points overall, did not qualify for the promotion play-offs which were instead played by Roeselare and Antwerp. Antwerp beat Roeselare twice (3–1 at home and 1–2 in Roeselare) and returned to the highest level of Belgian football after thirteen seasons at the second level. Roeselare did qualify for the Europa League play-offs together with Lierse and Union SG. At the bottom end, Lommel United was relegated.

===== Aggregate table =====
Pos	Team	Pld	W	D	L	GF	GA	GD	Pts	Qualification
1	Lierse	28	15	10	3	51	25	+26	55	Qualification to Europa League play-offs
2	Roeselare	28	14	8	6	42	32	+10	50	Qualification to Promotion play-offs (Note: The team that promoted to the 2017–18 Belgian First Division A, by winning the Promotion playoff, did not take part in the Europa League play-offs. The next team in the aggregate league table took its spot.)
3	Antwerp	28	13	10	5	40	26	+14	49	Qualification to Promotion play-offs
4	Union SG	28	9	8	11	33	34	−1	35	Qualification to Europa League play-offs
5	Tubize	28	10	4	14	42	53	−11	34	Qualification to Relegation play-offs (Note: In case the team that wins the Promotion playoff finishes in the bottom four, the 4th placed team will play the relegation playoff instead.)
6	Cercle Brugge	28	9	6	13	32	40	−8	33	Qualification to Relegation play-offs
7	OH Leuven	28	7	9	12	33	42	−9	30	Qualification to Relegation play-offs
8	Lommel United	28	3	9	16	31	52	−21	18	Qualification to Relegation play-offs

Source: Belgian First Division B (in French and Dutch)
Rules for classification: 1) Points; 2) Matches won; 3) Goal difference; 4) Goals scored; 5) Away goals scored; 6) Away matches won; 7) Play-off.

===== Promotion play-offs =====
Antwerp twice beat Roeselare and thereby allowed the club to return to the highest level of professional football in Belgium following thirteen seasons at the second level. Initially, they did not receive a license to compete in professional football the following season, but the decision was overturned. Roeselare got to play the Europa League play-offs.

5 March 2017
14:30

Antwerp	3–1	Roeselare
Dequevy 35'; Damman 57' (o.g.); Hairemans 73' (pen.)	Report	Schmisser 64'

Bosuilstadion, Antwerp
Referee: Ken Vermeiren

11 March 2017
20:00

Roeselare	1–2	Antwerp
Schmisser 35'	Report	Dierckx 30'; Limbombe 78'

Schiervelde Stadion, Roeselare
Referee: Erik Lambrechts

Antwerp won 5–2 on aggregate and was promoted.

===== Relegation play-offs =====
The four bottom teams overall competed in the relegation play-offs. In spite of a strong comeback, Lommel United was relegated finally on the last matchday after losing away to OH Leuven.

Pos	Team	Pld	W	D	L	GF	GA	GD	Pts	Qualification	TUB	OHL	CER	LOM
1	Tubize	6	1	4	1	6	6	0	24		—	1–0	2–2	0–0
2	OH Leuven	6	2	2	2	4	4	0	23		1–1	—	1–0	1–0
3	Cercle Brugge	6	1	3	2	4	9	−5	23		1–1	0–0	—	0–5
4	Lommel United (R)	6	3	1	2	9	4	+5	19	Relegation to the 2017–18 Belgian First Amateur Division	2–1	2–1	0–1	—

Source: Belgian First Division B, Soccerway
Rules for classification: 1) Points; 2) Points without (possible) half points added due to rounding; 3) Matches won; 4) Goal difference; 5) Goals scored; 6) Away goals scored; 7) Away matches won; 8) Play-off.
(R) Relegated

==== Belgian First Amateur Division ====
Pos	Team	Pld	W	D	L	GF	GA	GD	Pts	Qualification or relegation
1	Beerschot Wilrijk (Note: On 5 April 2017, the Belgian FA announced that Beerschot Wilrijk was the only team which had asked and obtained a Belgian professional football license for the coming season, giving the right to play at the professional levels of Belgian football and necessary to be able to promote from the Belgian First Amateur Division. Only Deinze had also made the request but it had only received a Belgian remunerated football license. As a result, Beerschot-Wilrijk was already certain of the promotion even before the end of the regular season, let alone the promotional play-offs.) (P)	30	26	2	2	63	16	+47	80	Qualification for the promotion play-offs
2	Dessel	30	20	6	4	68	28	+40	66	Qualification for the promotion play-offs
3	Virton	30	19	2	9	63	30	+33	59	Qualification for the promotion play-offs
4	Heist	30	16	3	11	61	42	+19	51	Qualification for the promotion play-offs
5	Dender EH	30	15	5	10	53	43	+10	50	
6	Deinze	30	14	6	10	46	34	+12	48 (Note: On 24 February 2017, following a complaint from Seraing United and Sprimont-Comblain, the appeal committee ruled that Deinze defender Jarric Buysse was not correctly registered and all matches in which he played were to be converted on 0-5 losses for Deinze. Buysse played in 16 of the 22 matches played at that time, causing Deinze to drop from third place (41 points) to last place (7 points). On 4 May 2017, after the regular season had finished, the arbitrage committee ruled that Deinze should be awarded the points. As a result, Deinze moved from last place (14 points) to sixth place (48 points) and as a result was saved from relegation.)	
7	Seraing	30	14	6	10	42	36	+6	48	
8	ASV Geel	30	13	5	12	53	44	+9	44	
9	Oudenaarde	30	12	4	14	41	43	−2	40	
10	Patro Eisden Maasmechelen	30	11	5	14	37	41	−4	38	
11	Hamme	30	9	8	13	52	59	−7	35	
12	Oosterzonen Oosterwijk	30	8	7	15	32	44	−12	31	
13	Hasselt (R)	30	6	8	16	29	48	−19	26	Qualification for the Second Amateur Division Promotion play-offs Final
14	Coxyde (Note: On 8 February 2017, Coxyde announced that it did not apply for a Belgian remunerated football license for the coming season and will therefore automatically relegate to the 2017–18 Belgian Second Amateur Division irrespective of its finishing position. Eventually the club decided not to participate in the 2017–18 season, only to restart at the lowest level of Belgian football as part of the 2018–19 season.) (R)	30	6	4	20	27	81	−54	22	Relegation to the Second Amateur Division
15	WS Brussels (Note: WS Brussels was refused a Belgian remunerated football license and did not appeal the decision, as a result the club will relegate automatically.) (D, R)	30	4	8	18	23	66	−43	20	Relegation to the Second Amateur Division
16	Sprimont-Comblain (R)	30	4	7	19	30	61	−31	19	Relegation to the Second Amateur Division

Source: Belgian First Division A (in Dutch), Soccerway
Rules for classification: 1) Points; 2) Goal difference; 3) Goals scored.
(D) Disqualified; (P) Promoted; (R) Relegated

==== Belgian Second Amateur Division ====
===== Division A =====
Pos	Team	Pld	W	D	L	GF	GA	GD	Pts	Promotion or relegation
1	Knokke (P)	30	23	3	4	73	25	+48	72	Promotion to the 2017–18 Belgian First Amateur Division
2	Petegem (Note: Petegem, Izegem and Temse did not apply for (or were not awarded) a Belgian remunerated football license and are thus not allowed to play in the 2017-18 Belgian First Amateur Division. As a result, the vacant places in the promotion play-offs VFV were taken by the highest finishers not already eligible: Brakel and Gent-Zeehaven.)	30	17	7	6	60	44	+16	58	
3	Aalst (P)	30	17	5	8	55	37	+18	56	Qualification to Promotion play-offs VFV
4	Izegem	30	16	5	9	53	42	+11	53	
5	Sint-Eloois-Winkel	30	15	8	7	55	30	+25	53	Qualification to Promotion play-offs VFV
6	Brakel	30	12	7	11	59	51	+8	43	Qualification to Promotion play-offs VFV
7	Temse	30	13	3	14	38	45	−7	42	
8	Gent-Zeehaven	30	11	8	11	46	43	+3	41	Qualification to Promotion play-offs VFV
9	Torhout	30	11	6	13	36	45	−9	39	
10	Gullegem	30	10	7	13	46	52	−6	37	
11	Sint-Niklaas	30	9	8	13	45	49	−4	35	
12	Harelbeke	30	10	4	16	36	45	−9	34	
13	Westhoek	30	9	7	14	40	56	−16	34	
14	Bornem	30	8	10	12	31	39	−8	34	Qualification to relegation play-offs
15	Halle (R)	30	5	8	17	27	55	−28	23	Relegation to the 2017–18 Belgian Third Amateur Division
16	Menen (R)	30	4	4	22	35	77	−42	16	Relegation to the 2017–18 Belgian Third Amateur Division

Updated to match(es) played on 13 May 2017. Source: https://int.soccerway.com/national/belgium/third-division/20162017/group-a/r36768/
Rules for classification: 1) points; 2) goal difference; 3) number of goals scored.
(P) Promoted; (R) Relegated

===== Division B =====
Pos	Team	Pld	W	D	L	GF	GA	GD	Pts	Promotion or relegation
1	Berchem Sport (P)	30	20	8	2	65	24	+41	68	Promotion to the 2017–18 Belgian First Amateur Division
2	Tessenderlo	30	21	3	6	61	38	+23	66	Qualification to Promotion play-offs VFV
3	Rupel Boom	30	15	7	8	55	38	+17	52	Qualification to Promotion play-offs VFV
4	Spouwen-Mopertingen (Note: Besides Berchem Sport, Tessenderlo and Rupel-Boom, no other teams applied for (or were awarded) a Belgian remunerated football license although several were eligible to participate based on their finishing position. As a result, these teams are not allowed to play in the 2017-18 Belgian First Amateur Division and therefore two places in the promotion play-offs VFV were vacant.)	30	15	5	10	54	56	−2	50	
5	Wijgmaal	30	12	8	10	45	42	+3	44	
6	Bocholt	30	10	11	9	44	39	+5	41	
7	Zwarte Leeuw	30	12	4	14	39	56	−17	40	
8	Londerzeel	30	10	8	12	46	39	+7	38	
9	Hoogstraten	30	11	4	15	51	60	−9	37	
10	Hades	30	11	4	15	45	60	−15	37	
11	Overijse	30	11	3	16	53	59	−6	36	
12	Cappellen	30	8	12	10	41	42	−1	36	
13	Duffel	30	10	5	15	53	56	−3	35	
14	Tienen-Hageland	30	8	6	16	29	45	−16	30	Qualification to relegation play-offs
15	Grimbergen (R)	30	7	8	15	35	46	−11	29	Relegation to the 2017–18 Belgian Third Amateur Division
16	Woluwe-Zaventem (R)	30	7	8	15	46	62	−16	29	Relegation to the 2017–18 Belgian Third Amateur Division

Updated to match(es) played on 13 May 2017. Source: https://int.soccerway.com/national/belgium/third-division/20162017/vfv-b/r37998/
Rules for classification: 1) points; 2) goal difference; 3) number of goals scored.
(P) Promoted; (R) Relegated

===== Division C =====
Pos	Team	Pld	W	D	L	GF	GA	GD	Pts	Promotion or relegation
1	Châtelet (P)	30	21	7	2	67	32	+35	70	Promotion to the 2017–18 Belgian First Amateur Division
2	RFC Liège	30	19	8	3	66	30	+36	65	Qualification to Promotion play-offs ACFF
3	Olympic Charleroi	30	15	6	9	61	46	+15	51	Qualification to Promotion play-offs ACFF
4	La Louvière Centre	30	13	11	6	54	35	+19	50	Qualification to Promotion play-offs ACFF
5	Hamoir (Note: Besides RFC Liège, Olympic Charleroi and La Louvière Centre, no other teams applied for (or were awarded) a Belgian remunerated football license although several were eligible to participate based on their finishing position. As a result, these teams are not allowed to play in the 2017-18 Belgian First Amateur Division and therefore one place in the promotion play-offs ACFF was vacant.)	30	12	8	10	50	49	+1	44	
6	Acrenoise	30	12	6	12	48	48	0	42	
7	Solières	30	11	9	10	52	48	+4	42	
8	Walhain	30	11	8	11	52	53	−1	41	
9	Union La Calamine	30	11	7	12	65	59	+6	40	
10	Waremme	30	12	2	16	60	58	+2	38	
11	Ciney	30	9	10	11	56	57	−1	37	
12	Meux	30	10	6	14	53	51	+2	36	
13	Couvin-Mariembourg (R)	30	9	6	15	54	66	−12	33	Relegation to the 2017–18 Belgian Third Amateur Division
14	Givry (R)	30	7	9	14	39	60	−21	30	Relegation to the 2017–18 Belgian Third Amateur Division
15	Charleroi Fleurus (R)	30	6	8	16	37	77	−40	26	Relegation to the 2017–18 Belgian Third Amateur Division
16	Namur (R)	30	3	7	20	32	77	−45	16	Relegation to the 2017–18 Belgian Third Amateur Division

Updated to match(es) played on 16 May 2017. Source: https://int.soccerway.com/national/belgium/third-division/20162017/group-b/r36769/
Rules for classification: 1) points; 2) goal difference; 3) number of goals scored.
(P) Promoted; (R) Relegated

==== Belgian Third Amateur Division ====
===== Division A =====
Pos	Team	Pld	W	D	L	GF	GA	GD	Pts	Qualification or relegation
1	Ingelmunster (Note: Although OMS Ingelmunster officially received promotion, the team will cease to exist and instead merge with KFC Izegem, playing in the Belgian Second Amateur Division, to become Mandel United. As a result, one extra promotion spot became available in the Promotion play-offs VFV.) (C, P)	30	22	5	3	71	33	+38	71	Promotion to the 2017–18 Belgian Second Amateur Division
2	Wetteren	30	20	2	8	58	37	+21	62	Qualification to Promotion play-offs VFV
3	Pepingen (P)	30	16	7	7	50	38	+12	55	Qualification to Promotion play-offs VFV
4	Ronse (P)	30	16	5	9	54	33	+21	53	Qualification to Promotion play-offs VFV
5	Dikkelvenne	30	12	11	7	56	45	+11	47	Qualification to Promotion play-offs VFV
6	Ninove	30	13	5	12	59	43	+16	44	
7	Mariekerke	30	11	6	13	49	51	−2	39	
8	Wolvertem Merchtem	30	11	6	13	38	52	−14	39	
9	Lebbeke	30	10	9	11	49	43	+6	39	
10	Lede	30	10	7	13	53	52	+1	37	
11	Merelbeke	30	9	10	11	40	46	−6	37	
12	Wervik	30	9	9	12	41	44	−3	36	
13	Vlamertinge	30	8	7	15	37	46	−9	31	Qualification to relegation play-offs
14	Berlare (R)	30	8	6	16	31	55	−24	30	Relegation to the 2017–18 Belgian Provincial Leagues
15	Sint-Gillis Waas (R)	30	4	12	14	24	49	−25	24	Relegation to the 2017–18 Belgian Provincial Leagues
16	Zele (R)	30	3	9	18	25	68	−43	18	Relegation to the 2017–18 Belgian Provincial Leagues

Source: https://int.soccerway.com/national/belgium/promotion/20162017/group-a/r36836/
(C) Champions; (P) Promoted; (R) Relegated

===== Division B =====
Pos	Team	Pld	W	D	L	GF	GA	GD	Pts	Qualification or relegation
1	Turnhout (C, P)	30	19	6	5	74	38	+36	63	Promotion to the 2017–18 Belgian Second Amateur Division
2	City Pirates (P)	30	18	5	7	80	40	+40	59	Qualification to Promotion play-offs VFV
3	Sint-Lenaarts (P)	30	15	9	6	45	32	+13	54	Qualification to Promotion play-offs VFV
4	Diegem	30	14	8	8	54	49	+5	50	Qualification to Promotion play-offs VFV
5	Vosselaar (P)	30	15	4	11	55	49	+6	49	Qualification to Promotion play-offs VFV
6	Esperanza Pelt	30	13	6	11	49	44	+5	45	
7	Houtvenne	30	13	5	12	60	53	+7	44	
8	Eppegem	30	12	7	11	49	49	0	43	
9	Leopoldsburg	30	10	9	11	38	38	0	39	
10	Nijlen	30	10	8	12	31	36	−5	38	
11	Wellen	30	10	6	14	48	42	+6	36	
12	Sterrebeek	30	9	9	12	37	40	−3	36	
13	Diest	30	9	7	14	46	67	−21	34	Qualification to relegation play-offs
14	Helchteren (R)	30	9	5	16	29	44	−15	32	Relegation to the 2017–18 Belgian Provincial Leagues
15	Betekom (R)	30	9	5	16	45	67	−22	32	Relegation to the 2017–18 Belgian Provincial Leagues
16	Racing Mechelen (R)	30	2	7	21	29	81	−52	13	Relegation to the 2017–18 Belgian Provincial Leagues

Source: https://int.soccerway.com/national/belgium/promotion/20162017/vfv-b/r37999/
(C) Champions; (P) Promoted; (R) Relegated

===== Division C =====
Pos	Team	Pld	W	D	L	GF	GA	GD	Pts	Qualification or relegation
1	RWDM47 (C, P)	26	19	4	3	72	31	+41	61	Promotion to the 2017–18 Belgian Second Amateur Division
2	Rebecq (P)	26	19	4	3	58	24	+34	61	Qualification to Promotion play-offs ACFF
3	Francs Borains	26	18	6	2	63	21	+42	60	Qualification to Promotion play-offs ACFF
4	Albert Quevy-Mons	26	13	8	5	54	28	+26	47	Qualification to Promotion play-offs ACFF
5	Tournai	26	11	7	8	55	46	+9	40	Qualification to Promotion play-offs ACFF
6	Onhaye	26	11	4	11	34	44	−10	37	
7	Manage	26	9	8	9	34	35	−1	35	
8	Uccle	26	8	10	8	44	32	+12	34	
9	Wavre	26	8	6	12	41	35	+6	30	
10	Solre	26	6	9	11	32	59	−27	27	
11	Waterloo	26	7	5	14	30	49	−19	26	
12	Ganshoren	26	7	4	15	38	66	−28	25	
13	Tamines	26	5	5	16	29	51	−22	20	Qualification to relegation play-offs
14	Profondeville (R)	26	0	2	24	18	81	−63	2	Relegation to the 2017–18 Belgian Provincial Leagues

Source: https://int.soccerway.com/national/belgium/promotion/20162017/group-a/r36836/
(C) Champions; (P) Promoted; (R) Relegated

===== Division D =====
Pos	Team	Pld	W	D	L	GF	GA	GD	Pts	Qualification or relegation
1	Durbuy (C, P)	26	20	4	2	52	15	+37	64	Promotion to the 2017–18 Belgian Second Amateur Division
2	Tilleur	26	17	6	3	60	20	+40	57	Qualification to Promotion play-offs ACFF
3	Verlaine	26	13	6	7	40	29	+11	45	Qualification to Promotion play-offs ACFF
4	Richelle	26	12	7	7	46	36	+10	43	Qualification to Promotion play-offs ACFF
5	Mormont	26	12	5	9	49	42	+7	41	Qualification to Promotion play-offs ACFF
6	Huy	26	12	3	11	51	44	+7	39	
7	Bertrix	26	8	8	10	39	46	−7	32	
8	Cointe	26	9	4	13	38	47	−9	31	
9	Aische	26	9	3	14	35	42	−7	30	
10	Longlier	26	8	6	12	35	40	−5	30	
11	Herstal	26	7	7	12	30	36	−6	28	
12	Aywaille	26	7	7	12	30	43	−13	28	
13	Warnant (R)	26	8	3	15	34	61	−27	27	Qualification to relegation play-offs
14	Arlon (R)	26	2	7	17	32	70	−38	13	Relegation to the 2017–18 Belgian Provincial Leagues

Source: https://int.soccerway.com/national/belgium/promotion/20162017/group-a/r36836/
(C) Champions; (P) Promoted; (R) Relegated

=== Cup competitions ===
Competition	Winner	Score	Runner-up
2016–17 Belgian Cup	Zulte Waregem	3–3 (a.e.t.) (4–2 p)	Oostende
2016 Belgian Super Cup	Club Brugge	2–1	Standard Liège

== UEFA competitions ==
Champions Club Brugge qualified directly for the group stage of the Champions League, while runners-up Anderlecht started in the qualifying rounds. As cup winner, Standard Liège qualified directly for the group stage of the Europa League, while Gent and Genk started in the qualifying rounds.

Overall, Belgian football clubs performed very strongly during the 2016–17 season, with both Anderlecht, Genk and Gent still active after the winter break and going very far in the 2016–17 UEFA Europa League, more specifically it was the first time since the 1993–94 season that three Belgian clubs reached the last 16 in Europe in the same season.

- Club Brugge had a difficult European season as they lost all six matches in the group stage of the 2016–17 UEFA Champions League, in a group with Leicester City, Porto and Copenhagen.
- Anderlecht also started mediocre, not getting past Rostov in the 2016–17 UEFA Champions League third qualifying round after first getting a 2–2 draw in Russia before losing 0–2 at home. As a result, they entered the Play-off round of the 2016–17 UEFA Europa League where they fared much better, by easily overcoming Slavia Prague (winning twice 3–0). In the group stage they started with a home win against Gabala and looked on their way to a 0–1 away win against Saint-Etienne before conceding and injury time equalizer. They then scored 4 points in two matches against Mainz, including a spectacular 6–1 home win. Injury time goals against Gabala secured qualification but on the final matchday Anderlecht gave away a 2–0 lead at home to Saint-Etienne to lose 2–3 and with that they also had to settle for the runner-up position. In the round of 32, Anderlecht were coupled with Zenit Saint Petersburg and were underdogs. Following a confident 2–0 home win they were going into the return leg with a comfortable lead, however Zenit stormed past Anderlecht in the return leg to lead 3–0 with only ten minutes to play. In the injury time, Isaac Kiese Thelin scored his first ever goal for Anderlecht to send them through on the away goals rule. In the round of 16, Anderlecht strolled past APOEL with two 1–0 victories before meeting Manchester United in the quarterfinals. At home, Leander Dendoncker headed in the 1–1 equalizer just minutes before the end of the match. At Old Trafford, Anderlecht held Manchester to another 1–1 draw, sending the match into extra time. Marcus Rashford finally scored the 2–1, eliminating Anderlecht in their first quarter final since 1997.
- In the same manner as Club Brugge but in the Europa League rather than the Champions League, Standard Liège had also qualified directly for the group stage and failed to progress. In contrary to Club Brugge however, Standard Liège did manage to score some points and were even in the running to progress up to last matchday. Standard started with a 1–1 draw at home with Celta de Vigo and a loss away to Ajax. They then scored 4 out of 6 against Panathinaikos before again holding Celta de Vigo to 1–1. On the last matchday, they needed to beat the result of Celta de Vigo playing away to Panathinaikos, but whereas Celta won, Standard Liège only managed to draw 1–1 with Ajax and where thus eliminated.
- Gent started in the third qualifying round of the Europa League where they started with a convincing 5–0 home win against Viitorul Constanța, followed up with a lacklustre 0–0 in Romania. In the play-off round Gent also had no problems with Macedonian team Shkëndija, winning twice: 2–1 at home and 4–0 away. They thus qualified for the group stage where they drew an uninteresting group with far away teams Konyaspor, Shakhtar Donetsk and Braga. Gent started with a 1–1 draw away to Braga before beating Konyaspor 2–0 at home. They then conceded ten goals over two matches with Shakhtar Donetsk, losing 5–0 in Ukraine and 3–5 in Ghent. After another draw with Braga (2–2), Gent went into the last match knowing that they could progress only in case of an away win at Konyaspor while also requiring Braga not to win against Shakhtar. Shakhtar soon took the lead but Gent struggled throughout the match to create chances against Konyaspor and looked on their way to elimination as the match was about to end in a goalless draw when in the fifth minute of extra time Kalifa Coulibaly scored from outside of the penalty area to send Gent through. Gent was rewarded with a draw in the round of 32 against Tottenham Hotspur and managed to stun Tottenham in a 1–0 home win with a goal from Jérémy Perbet. In the return leg at Wembley, Gent was expected by many to lose but eliminated Tottenham following a 2–2 draw, with Perbet again scoring for Gent. Gent was then eliminated by Genk in the round of 16 after first losing the home leg 2–5 after which they only managed a draw in Genk.
- Genk received the final ticket in Europe and had to start already in the second qualifying round of the Europa League where they were drawn against Budućnost Podgorica from Montenegro. A 2–0 home win in the opening leg was quickly undone in the return leg as Genk was down 0–2 at halftime and the score would remain after extra-time, forcing a penalty shoot-out which Genk won 4–2. Genk then had less trouble with Cork City from Ireland, winning twice to progress into the play-off round where they faced Croatian team Lokomotiva. Genk took a 0–2 lead in Croatia but conceded two goals to only score a 2–2 away draw but followed this up with a convincing 2–0 home win to move into the group stage where they were paired with Athletic Bilbao, Rapid Wien and Sassuolo. Genk lost 3–2 away to Rapid Wien in their opening match but recovered with two home wins against Sassuolo (3–1) and Athletic Bilbao (2–0). They were then defeated 5–3 in Bilbao before scoring their third home win, beating Rapid Wien 1–0. Genk were already certain of qualification for the round of 16 before their final match, which was postponed by one day due to heavy fog in Sassuolo. As a result, on a Friday afternoon in an empty stadium, Genk won 0–2 away to Sassuolo in a match which had no more importance for neither team. In the round of 32, Genk drew 2–2 away to Romanian team Astra Giurgiu and then won the return match 1–0 before meeting Gent in the round of 16. Genk overclassed Gent during the first leg in Ghent, winning 2–5 and virtually killing the tie. The return ended in a dull 1–1 draw. Genk then fell to Celta de Vigo in the quarter-finals after first losing 3–2 in Spain but then coming one goal short as they were held to a 1–1 draw in Genk.

Date	Team	Competition	Round	Leg	Opponent	Location	Score	Belgian Team Goalscorers
14 July 2016	Genk	Europa League	Qual. Round 2	Leg 1, Home	(Montenegro) Budućnost Podgorica	Luminus Arena, Genk	2–0	Kebano, Samatta
21 July 2016	Genk	Europa League	Qual. Round 2	Leg 2, Away	(Montenegro) Budućnost Podgorica	Podgorica City Stadium, Podgorica	2–0 (aet)(2–4 p)	
26 July 2016	Anderlecht	Champions League	Qual. Round 3	Leg 1, Away	(Russia) Rostov	Olimp-2, Rostov-on-Don	2–2	Hanni, Tielemans
28 July 2016	Genk	Europa League	Qual. Round 3	Leg 1, Home	(Republic of Ireland) Cork City	Luminus Arena, Genk	1–0	Bailey
28 July 2016	Gent	Europa League	Qual. Round 3	Leg 1, Home	(Romania) Viitorul Constanța	Ghelamco Arena, Ghent	5–0	Mitrović, Coulibaly (2), Depoitre, Neto
3 August 2016	Anderlecht	Champions League	Qual. Round 3	Leg 2, Home	(Russia) Rostov	Constant Vanden Stock Stadium, Anderlecht	2–0	
4 August 2016	Genk	Europa League	Qual. Round 3	Leg 2, Away	(Republic of Ireland) Cork City	Turners Cross, Cork	1–2	Buffel, Dewaest
4 August 2016	Gent	Europa League	Qual. Round 3	Leg 2, Away	(Romania) Viitorul Constanța	Stadionul Viitorul, Ovidiu	0–0	
18 August 2016	Anderlecht	Europa League	Play-off round	Leg 1, Away	(Czech Republic) Slavia Prague	Eden Arena, Prague	0–3	Sylla, Teodorczyk, Hanni
18 August 2016	Genk	Europa League	Play-off round	Leg 1, Away	(Croatia) Lokomotiva	Stadion Maksimir, Zagreb	2–2	Bailey, Samatta
18 August 2016	Gent	Europa League	Play-off round	Leg 1, Home	(North Macedonia) Shkëndija	Ghelamco Arena, Ghent	2–1	Matton, Coulibaly
25 August 2016	Anderlecht	Europa League	Play-off round	Leg 2, Home	(Czech Republic) Slavia Prague	Constant Vanden Stock Stadium, Anderlecht	3–0	Tielemans, Teodorczyk, Heylen
25 August 2016	Genk	Europa League	Play-off round	Leg 2, Home	(Croatia) Lokomotiva	Luminus Arena, Genk	2–0	Samatta, Bailey
25 August 2016	Gent	Europa League	Play-off round	Leg 2, Away	(North Macedonia) Shkëndija	Philip II Arena, Skopje	2–1	Matton, Coulibaly
14 September 2016	Club Brugge	Champions League	Group Stage	Matchday 1, Home	(England) Leicester City	Jan Breydel Stadium, Bruges	0–3	
15 September 2016	Anderlecht	Europa League	Group Stage	Matchday 1, Home	(Azerbaijan) Gabala	Constant Vanden Stock Stadium, Anderlecht	3–1	Teodorczyk, Rafael (o.g.), Capel
15 September 2016	Genk	Europa League	Group Stage	Matchday 1, Away	(Austria) Rapid Wien	Allianz Stadion, Vienna	3–2	Bailey (2)
15 September 2016	Gent	Europa League	Group Stage	Matchday 1, Away	(Portugal) Braga	Estádio Municipal de Braga, Braga	1–1	Milićević
15 September 2016	Standard Liège	Europa League	Group Stage	Matchday 1, Home	(Spain) Celta Vigo	Stade Maurice Dufrasne, Liège	1–1	Dossevi
27 September 2016	Club Brugge	Champions League	Group Stage	Matchday 2, Away	(Denmark) Copenhagen	Parken Stadium, Copenhagen	4–0	
29 September 2016	Anderlecht	Europa League	Group Stage	Matchday 2, Away	(France) Saint-Étienne	Stade Geoffroy-Guichard, Saint-Étienne	1–1	Tielemans
29 September 2016	Genk	Europa League	Group Stage	Matchday 2, Home	(Italy) Sassuolo	Luminus Arena, Genk	3–1	Karelis, Bailey, Buffel
29 September 2016	Gent	Europa League	Group Stage	Matchday 2, Home	(Turkey) Konyaspor	Ghelamco Arena, Ghent	2–0	Sayef, Neto
29 September 2016	Standard Liège	Europa League	Group Stage	Matchday 2, Away	(Netherlands) Ajax	Amsterdam Arena, Amsterdam	1–0	
18 October 2016	Club Brugge	Champions League	Group Stage	Matchday 3, Home	(Portugal) Porto	Jan Breydel Stadium, Bruges	1–2	Vossen
20 October 2016	Anderlecht	Europa League	Group Stage	Matchday 3, Away	(Germany) Mainz	Opel Arena, Mainz	1–1	Teodorczyk
20 October 2016	Genk	Europa League	Group Stage	Matchday 3, Home	(Spain) Athletic Bilbao	Luminus Arena, Genk	2–0	Brabec, Ndidi
20 October 2016	Gent	Europa League	Group Stage	Matchday 3, Away	(Ukraine) Shakhtar Donetsk	Arena Lviv, Lviv	5–0	
20 October 2016	Standard Liège	Europa League	Group Stage	Matchday 3, Home	(Greece) Panathinaikos	Stade Maurice Dufrasne, Liège	2–2	Edmilson, Belfodil
2 November 2016	Club Brugge	Champions League	Group Stage	Matchday 4, Away	(Portugal) Porto	Estádio do Dragão, Porto	1–0	
3 November 2016	Anderlecht	Europa League	Group Stage	Matchday 4, Home	(Germany) Mainz	Constant Vanden Stock Stadium, Anderlecht	6–1	Stanciu (2), Tielemans, Teodorczyk (2), Bruno
3 November 2016	Genk	Europa League	Group Stage	Matchday 4, Away	(Spain) Athletic Bilbao	San Mamés, Bilbao	5–3	Bailey, Ndidi, Sušić
3 November 2016	Gent	Europa League	Group Stage	Matchday 4, Home	(Ukraine) Shakhtar Donetsk	Ghelamco Arena, Ghent	3–5	Coulibaly, Perbet, Milićević
3 November 2016	Standard Liège	Europa League	Group Stage	Matchday 4, Away	(Greece) Panathinaikos	Leoforos Alexandras Stadium, Athens	0–3	Cissé, Belfodil (2)
22 November 2016	Club Brugge	Champions League	Group Stage	Matchday 5, Away	(England) Leicester City	King Power Stadium, Leicester	2–1	Izquierdo
24 November 2016	Anderlecht	Europa League	Group Stage	Matchday 5, Away	(Azerbaijan) Gabala	Bakcell Arena, Baku	1–3	Tielemans, Bruno, Teodorczyk
24 November 2016	Genk	Europa League	Group Stage	Matchday 5, Home	(Austria) Rapid Wien	Luminus Arena, Genk	1–0	Karelis
24 November 2016	Gent	Europa League	Group Stage	Matchday 5, Home	(Portugal) Braga	Ghelamco Arena, Ghent	2–2	Coulibaly, Milićević
24 November 2016	Standard Liège	Europa League	Group Stage	Matchday 5, Away	(Spain) Celta Vigo	Balaídos, Vigo	1–1	Laifis
7 December 2016	Club Brugge	Champions League	Group Stage	Matchday 6, Home	(Denmark) Copenhagen	Jan Breydel Stadium, Bruges	0–2	
8 December 2016	Anderlecht	Europa League	Group Stage	Matchday 6, Home	(France) Saint-Étienne	Constant Vanden Stock Stadium, Anderlecht	2–3	Chipciu, Stanciu
8 December 2016	Gent	Europa League	Group Stage	Matchday 6, Away	(Turkey) Konyaspor	Torku Arena, Konya	0–1	Coulibaly
8 December 2016	Standard Liège	Europa League	Group Stage	Matchday 6, Home	(Netherlands) Ajax	Stade Maurice Dufrasne, Liège	1–1	Raman
9 December 2016	Genk	Europa League	Group Stage	Matchday 6, Away	(Italy) Sassuolo	Mapei Stadium – Città del Tricolore, Reggio Emilia	0–2	Heynen, Trossard
16 February 2017	Anderlecht	Europa League	Round of 32	Leg 1, Home	(Russia) Zenit Saint Petersburg	Constant Vanden Stock Stadium, Anderlecht	2–0	Acheampong (2)
16 February 2017	Genk	Europa League	Round of 32	Leg 1, Away	(Romania) Astra Giurgiu	Stadionul Marin Anastasovici, Giurgiu	2–2	Castagne, Trossard
16 February 2017	Gent	Europa League	Round of 32	Leg 1, Home	(England) Tottenham Hotspur	Ghelamco Arena, Ghent	1–0	Perbet
23 February 2017	Anderlecht	Europa League	Round of 32	Leg 2, Away	(Russia) Zenit Saint Petersburg	Petrovsky Stadium, Saint Petersburg	3–1	Kiese Thelin
23 February 2017	Genk	Europa League	Round of 32	Leg 2, Home	(Romania) Astra Giurgiu	Luminus Arena, Genk	1–0	Pozuelo
23 February 2017	Gent	Europa League	Round of 32	Leg 2, Away	(England) Tottenham Hotspur	Wembley Stadium, London	2–2	Kane (o.g.), Perbet
9 March 2017	Anderlecht	Europa League	Round of 16	Leg 1, Away	(Cyprus) APOEL	GSP Stadium, Nicosia	0–1	Stanciu
9 March 2017	Genk	Europa League	Round of 16	Leg 1, Away	(Belgium) Gent	Ghelamco Arena, Ghent	2–5	Malinovskyi, Colley, Samatta (2), Uronen
9 March 2017	Gent	Europa League	Round of 16	Leg 1, Home	(Belgium) Genk	Ghelamco Arena, Ghent	2–5	Kalu, Coulibaly
16 March 2017	Anderlecht	Europa League	Round of 16	Leg 2, Home	(Cyprus) APOEL	Constant Vanden Stock Stadium, Anderlecht	1–0	Acheampong
16 March 2017	Genk	Europa League	Round of 16	Leg 2, Home	(Belgium) Gent	Luminus Arena, Genk	1–1	Castagne
16 March 2017	Gent	Europa League	Round of 16	Leg 2, Away	(Belgium) Genk	Luminus Arena, Genk	1–1	L. Verstraete
13 April 2017	Anderlecht	Europa League	Quarter-finals	Leg 1, Home	(England) Manchester United	Constant Vanden Stock Stadium, Anderlecht	1–1	Dendoncker
13 April 2017	Genk	Europa League	Quarter-finals	Leg 1, Away	(Spain) Celta Vigo	Balaídos, Vigo	3–2	Boëtius, Buffel
20 April 2017	Anderlecht	Europa League	Quarter-finals	Leg 2, Away	(England) Manchester United	Old Trafford, Manchester	2–1 (aet)	Hanni
20 April 2017	Genk	Europa League	Quarter-finals	Leg 2, Home	(Spain) Celta Vigo	Luminus Arena, Genk	1–1	Trossard

1. Lokomotiva played their play-off round home match at Stadion Maksimir, Zagreb, instead of their regular stadium Stadion Kranjčevićeva, Zagreb.
2. Shkëndija played their home match at Philip II Arena, Skopje, instead of their regular stadium City Stadium, Tetovo.
3. Shakhtar Donetsk play their home matches at Arena Lviv, Lviv instead of their regular stadium, Donbas Arena in Donetsk, due to the war in Donbas.
4. Gabala play their home match at Bakcell Arena, Baku instead of their regular stadium, City Stadium, Qabala, as it does not meet UEFA requirements.
5. The Sassuolo v Genk match, originally scheduled on 8 December 2016, 19:00 CET, was postponed to the following day due to heavy fog.
6. Tottenham Hotspur played their home match at Wembley Stadium, London instead of their regular stadium, White Hart Lane, London, due to renovation.

=== European qualification for 2017–18 summary ===
Competition	Qualifiers	Reason for Qualification
UEFA Champions League Group Stage	Anderlecht	1st in Belgian First Division A
UEFA Champions League Third Qualifying Round for Non-Champions	Club Brugge	2nd in Belgian First Division A
UEFA Europa League Group Stage	Zulte Waregem	Cup winner
UEFA Europa League Third Qualifying Round	Gent	3rd in Belgian First Division A
UEFA Europa League Second Qualifying Round	Oostende	Europa League Playoff winner

== Managerial changes ==
This is a list of changes of managers within Belgian professional league football (Belgian First Division A and Belgian First Division B):

Team	Division	Outgoing manager	Manner of departure	Date of vacancy	Position	Replaced by	Date of appointment
Sint-Truiden	Belgian First Division A	(Northern Ireland) Chris O'Loughlin	Sacked	End of 2015–16 season	Pre-season	(Croatia) Ivan Leko	14 April 2016
Antwerp	Belgian First Division B	(Belgium) David Gevaert	Sacked	End of 2015–16 season	Pre-season	(Belgium) Frederik Vanderbiest	19 May 2016
Anderlecht	Belgian First Division A	(Albania) Besnik Hasi	Mutual consent	End of 2015–16 season	Pre-season	(Switzerland) René Weiler	21 June 2016
Kortrijk	Belgian First Division A	(Belgium) Patrick De Wilde	Mutual consent	End of 2015–16 season	Pre-season	(France) Karim Belhocine	1 July 2016
Cercle Brugge	Belgian First Division B	(Belgium) Frederik Vanderbiest	Mutual consent	18 May 2016	Pre-season	(Belgium) Vincent Euvrard	25 May 2016
Roeselare	Belgian First Division B	(Belgium) Franky Van der Elst	Mutual consent	18 May 2016	Pre-season	(France) Arnauld Mercier	25 May 2016
Tubize	Belgian First Division B	(France) Colbert Marlot	Mutual consent	8 June 2016	Pre-season	(France) Thierry Goudet	8 June 2016
Tubize	Belgian First Division B	(France) Thierry Goudet	Sacked	17 August 2016	8th	(France) Régis Brouard	28 August 2016
Kortrijk	Belgian First Division A	(France) Karim Belhocine	Did not possess Pro-licence diploma	29 August 2016	8th	(Belgium) Bart Van Lancker	29 August 2016
Standard Liège	Belgian First Division A	(Belgium) Yannick Ferrera	Sacked	6 September 2016	10th	(Serbia) Aleksandar Janković	6 September 2016
Mechelen	Belgian First Division A	(Serbia) Aleksandar Janković	Signed by Standard Liège	6 September 2016	7th	(Belgium) Yannick Ferrera	12 September 2016
Westerlo	Belgian First Division A	(Belgium) Bob Peeters	Sacked	13 September 2016	16th	(Belgium) Jacky Mathijssen	14 September 2016
Lommel United	Belgian First Division B	(Belgium) Karel Fraeye	Sacked	8 October 2016	8th	(Belgium) Walter Meeuws	20 October 2016
Antwerp	Belgian First Division B	(Belgium) Frederik Vanderbiest	Sacked	11 October 2016	4th	(Belgium) David Gevaert	15 October 2016
Lokeren	Belgian First Division A	(Belgium) Georges Leekens	Sacked	26 October 2016	12th	(Iceland) Rúnar Kristinsson	28 October 2016
Waasland-Beveren	Belgian First Division A	(Belgium) Stijn Vreven	Sacked	28 October 2016	14th	(North Macedonia) Čedomir Janevski	7 November 2016
Cercle Brugge	Belgian First Division B	(Belgium) Vincent Euvrard	Sacked	29 October 2016	7th	(Belgium) José Riga	1 November 2016
Antwerp	Belgian First Division B	(Belgium) David Gevaert	Resigned	10 November 2016	3rd	(Belgium) Wim De Decker	17 November 2016
Lommel United	Belgian First Division B	(Belgium) Walter Meeuws	Sacked	23 November 2016	Closing tournament: 6th Overall: 8th	(Belgium) Tom Van Imschoot	23 November 2016
Excel Mouscron	Belgian First Division A	(Belgium) Glen De Boeck	Sacked	5 December 2016	15th	(Romania) Mircea Rednic	6 December 2016
Genk	Belgian First Division A	(Belgium) Peter Maes	Sacked	26 December 2016	9th	(Netherlands) Albert Stuivenberg	27 December 2016
OH Leuven	Belgian First Division B	(Belgium) Emilio Ferrera	Sacked	15 January 2017	Closing tournament: 6th Overall: 5th	(Netherlands) Dennis van Wijk	19 January 2017
Kortrijk	Belgian First Division A	(Belgium) Bart Van Lancker	Belhocine obtained Pro-licence diploma	8 March 2017	10th	(France) Karim Belhocine	8 March 2017
Lierse	Belgian First Division B	(Belgium) Eric Van Meir	Sacked	15 March 2017	Closing tournament: 2nd Overall: 1st	(Belgium) Frederik Vanderbiest	17 March 2017
Standard Liège	Belgian First Division A	(Serbia) Aleksandar Janković	Sacked	17 April 2017	Regular season: 9th Europa League POs: 5th	(Belgium) José Jeunechamps (caretaker)	17 April 2017
Tubize	Belgian First Division B	(France) Régis Brouard	Sacked	21 April 2017	Relegation play-offs: 2nd	(Senegal) Sadio Demba	3 May 2017

== See also ==
- 2016–17 Belgian First Division A
- 2016–17 Belgian First Division B
- 2016–17 Belgian First Amateur Division
- 2016–17 Belgian Second Amateur Division
- 2016–17 Belgian Third Amateur Division
- 2016–17 Belgian Cup
- 2016 Belgian Super Cup
