= 2018–19 Belgian First Amateur Division =

Belgian First Amateur Division
- Season: 2018–19
- Champions: Virton
- Promoted: Virton
- Relegated: Aalst, Geel, Knokke, Oudenaarde

The 2018–19 Belgian First Amateur Division was the third season of the third-tier football league in Belgium, as it was established in 2016. While Tessenderlo won the regular season, Virton became champions by virtue of winning the promotion play-offs. Defending champions Knokke finished last and were relegated together with Aalst and Geel. Oudenaarde was also relegated after losing the play-offs with teams from the Belgian Second Amateur Division.

== Team information ==
Locations of the 2018–19 Belgian First Amateur Division teams

=== Team changes ===
==== In ====
- Rupel Boom was promoted after winning the 2017–18 Belgian Second Amateur Division A.
- Tessenderlo was promoted after winning the 2017–18 Belgian Second Amateur Division B.
- RWDM47 was promoted after winning the 2017–18 Belgian Second Amateur Division C.
- RFC Liège was promoted after winning the Promotion play-offs.

Note that no team from the 2017–18 Belgian First Division B was relegated into the 2018–19 Belgian First Amateur Division due to the fact that Lierse went bankrupt.

==== Out ====
- Lommel were promoted from the 2017–18 Belgian First Amateur Division as they were the only team which had obtained a license.
- Berchem Sport and Patro Eisden Maasmechelen finished in the relegation zone (15th and 16th) in the 2017–18 Belgian First Amateur Division and were therefore relegated to the 2018–19 Belgian Second Amateur Division. Patro Eisden Maasmechelen had not applied for a Belgian remunerated football license and would have been relegated irrespective of their finishing position.
- Hamme lost the relegation play-offs and was thus relegated.

==== Merger ====
- Oosterzonen Oosterwijk merged with the bankrupt team Lierse to form Lierse Kempenzonen. As such it relocated from Westerlo to Lier.

== Regular season ==
=== League table ===
Pos	Team	Pld	W	D	L	GF	GA	GD	Pts	Qualification or relegation
1	Tessenderlo	30	19	5	6	62	28	+34	62	Qualification for the promotion play-offs
2	Deinze	30	17	8	5	53	30	+23	59	Qualification for the promotion play-offs
3	Virton	30	15	9	6	42	20	+22	54	Qualification for the promotion play-offs
4	Lierse Kempenzonen	30	13	9	8	42	36	+6	48	Qualification for the promotion play-offs
5	Rupel Boom	30	13	6	11	44	40	+4	45	
6	RFC Liège	30	11	8	11	41	35	+6	41	
7	Seraing	30	10	11	9	46	40	+6	41	
8	RWDM47	30	11	7	12	39	45	−6	40	
9	Dender EH	30	10	10	10	42	40	+2	40	
10	Heist	30	10	8	12	29	44	−15	38	
11	Châtelet (Note: After the season, Châtelet merged with Olympic Charleroi to become Olympic Charleroi Châtelet Farciennes, officially a continuation of Olympic Charleroi which will take the place of Châtelet in the 2019–20 Belgian First Amateur Division, while the team of Châtelet ceased to exist.)	30	9	9	12	30	37	−7	36	
12	Dessel	30	9	8	13	30	39	−9	35	
13	Oudenaarde (R)	30	10	4	16	37	59	−22	34	Qualification for the Second Amateur Division Promotion play-offs Final
14	ASV Geel (R)	30	9	4	17	42	62	−20	31	Relegation to the Second Amateur Division
15	Aalst (R)	30	7	10	13	35	49	−14	31	Relegation to the Second Amateur Division
16	Knokke (R)	30	6	6	18	35	45	−10	24	Relegation to the Second Amateur Division

Updated to match(es) played on completed. Source: Soccerway
Rules for classification: 1) Points; 2) Matches won; 3) Goal difference; 4) Goals scored; 5) Away goals scored; 6) Away matches won.
(R) Relegated

=== Results ===
Home \ Away	AAL	CHA	DEI	DEN	DES	GEE	HEI	KNO	LIE	OUD	RFC	RUP	RWD	SER	TES	VIR
Aalst	—	1–1	1–0	0–2	0–2	3–1	1–2	0–0	2–2	2–0	2–2	2–1	0–0	1–1	1–2	0–0
Châtelet	1–1	—	1–2	2–1	1–0	2–0	2–0	0–0	1–0	2–0	1–2	2–3	0–0	0–3	2–2	1–0
Deinze	3–2	3–1	—	2–2	0–0	5–0	0–0	2–1	3–0	2–1	1–0	3–0	3–0	0–2	1–1	0–0
Dender EH	2–0	1–1	0–2	—	2–0	4–1	5–1	1–1	1–1	0–1	2–1	3–3	0–1	0–4	0–2	2–1
Dessel	1–2	1–0	0–1	0–0	—	3–0	0–0	0–0	0–4	4–3	3–2	3–2	2–1	2–2	2–1	0–3
ASV Geel	1–2	1–1	2–3	3–3	2–1	—	5–0	1–0	1–3	2–0	2–1	1–2	3–0	0–0	3–2	1–3
Heist	2–1	2–0	0–2	1–2	1–0	3–1	—	0–3	1–0	2–0	1–0	0–1	2–3	1–1	0–4	1–3
Knokke	4–1	3–1	4–1	0–0	1–2	4–2	0–2	—	1–2	3–4	1–3	0–1	0–2	2–1	2–3	0–1
Lierse Kempenzonen	1–0	2–1	2–2	2–2	1–0	1–3	1–1	1–1	—	3–1	0–0	2–1	2–2	2–1	0–2	0–2
Oudenaarde	2–2	2–2	1–4	0–0	3–1	0–0	2–1	2–1	1–3	—	2–1	1–2	2–0	1–2	0–4	3–2
RFC Liège	3–1	3–0	3–0	2–1	1–1	3–0	1–1	2–1	2–1	1–2	—	2–1	0–0	2–1	2–5	0–1
Rupel Boom	2–2	1–1	1–2	2–1	0–0	1–3	3–0	1–0	1–0	3–0	0–0	—	2–0	2–0	0–2	0–1
RWDM47	1–3	1–2	0–2	2–0	3–2	4–1	0–1	3–2	1–1	4–0	1–0	1–4	—	2–0	4–3	1–1
Seraing	2–0	0–1	2–1	2–2	1–0	5–1	2–2	2–1	1–2	2–3	2–2	3–3	1–1	—	2–1	1–1
Tessenderlo	5–2	1–0	1–1	3–1	2–0	2–1	0–0	0–0	0–1	2–0	1–0	2–0	3–1	4–0	—	1–2
Virton	3–0	1–0	2–2	0–2	0–0	1–0	1–1	4–0	1–2	2–0	0–0	3–1	3–0	0–0	0–1	—

Updated to match(es) played on 11 April 2019. Source: Nationaal : 1st klasse (in Dutch)
Legend: Blue = home team win; Yellow = draw; Red = away team win.

== Promotion play-offs ==
The teams finishing in the top four positions entered the promotion play-offs. The points obtained during the regular season were halved (and rounded up) before the start of the playoff, as a result, Tessenderlo started with 31 points, Deinze with 30 points, Virton with 27 points and Lierse Kempenzonen with 24 points. Deinze was the only team for which the points were rounded up, therefore in case of equal points at the end of the playoffs they will always be ranked below the other teams. Going into the playoffs, only Deinze and Lierse had received a license, meaning that only those two teams are eligible for promotion, although Virton has successfully appealed the decision of not being handed a license and is thus also eligible for promotion.

Pos	Team	Pld	W	D	L	GF	GA	GD	Pts	Qualification	VIR	TES	LIE	DEI
1	Virton (C, P)	6	4	2	0	14	4	+10	41	Promotion to the 2019–20 Belgian First Division B	—	2–2	3–1	2–0
2	Tessenderlo	6	1	2	3	10	14	−4	36		0–2	—	2–4	4–1
3	Lierse Kempenzonen	6	3	1	2	14	14	0	34		0–4	2–2	—	4–1
4	Deinze	6	1	1	4	8	14	−6	34		1–1	3–0	2–3	—

Updated to match(es) played on completed. Source: Belgian First Amateur Division, Soccerway
Rules for classification: 1) Points; 2) Points without (possible) half points added due to rounding; 3) Matches won; 4) Goal difference; 5) Goals scored; 6) Away goals scored; 7) Away matches won; 8) Play-off.
(C) Champions; (P) Promoted

== Number of teams by provinces ==
Number of teams	Province or region	Team(s)
5	Antwerp	Dessel, Geel, Heist, Lierse Kempenzonen and Rupel Boom
4	East Flanders	Aalst, Dender EH, Deinze and Oudenaarde
2	Liège	RFC Liège and Seraing
1	Brussels	RWDM47
1	Limburg	Tessenderlo
1	Luxembourg	Virton
1	Hainaut	Châtelet
1	West Flanders	Knokke
