= 2017–18 Belgian Second Amateur Division =

Belgian Second Amateur Division
- Season: 2017–18
- Champions: Rupel Boom, Tessenderlo and RWDM
- Promoted: Rupel Boom, Tessenderlo, RWDM and RFC Liège
- Relegated: Bornem, Pepingen-Halle, Sint-Lenaarts, Tienen, Torhout, Zwarte Leeuw, La Calamine, Sprimont Comblain and WS Brussels

The 2017–18 Belgian Second Amateur Division is the second season of the division in its current format, placed at the fourth-tier of football in Belgium.

The division consists of three separate leagues, each containing 16 teams. Leagues A and B consist of teams with a license from the Voetbalfederatie Vlaanderen (VFV, the Dutch speaking wing of the Belgian FA), while league C contains teams with a license from the Association des Clubs Francophones de Football (ACFF, the French speaking wing of the RBFA). The champions from each of the three leagues will promote to the 2018–19 Belgian First Amateur Division. The fixtures will be announced in July 2017.

== Team changes ==
=== In ===
- Sprimont-Comblain and WS Brussels after finishing in the relegation zone in the 2016–17 Belgian First Amateur Division.
- Hasselt was also relegated from the 2016–17 Belgian First Amateur Division after losing the Second Amateur Division promotion play-offs, where the team failed to regain its place in the First Amateur Division.
- Ingelmunster was promoted after winning the 2016–17 Belgian Third Amateur Division A.
- Turnhout was promoted after winning the 2016–17 Belgian Third Amateur Division B.
- RWDM47 was promoted after winning the 2016–17 Belgian Third Amateur Division C.
- Durbuy was promoted after winning the 2016–17 Belgian Third Amateur Division D.
- City Pirates, Pepingen, Ronse, Sint-Lenaarts, Vosselaar were promoted as winners of the Third Amateur Division promotion play-offs VFV
- Rebecq was promoted as winners of the Third Amateur Division promotion play-offs ACFF

=== Out ===
- Knokke was promoted after winning the 2016–17 Belgian Second Amateur Division A.
- Berchem Sport was promoted after winning the 2016–17 Belgian Second Amateur Division B.
- Châtelet was promoted after winning the 2016–17 Belgian Second Amateur Division C.
- Aalst was promoted after winning the Second Amateur Division promotion play-offs.
- Halle, Menen, Grimbergen, Woluwe-Zaventem, Couvin-Mariembourg, Givry, Charleroi Fleurus and Namur were all relegated after finishing in the relegation positions the previous season.

=== Mergers ===
- Izegem merges with newly promoted Ingelmunster to form Mandel United.
- Newly promoted Pepingen, merges with relegated Halle to form Pepingen-Halle.

== Belgian Second Amateur Division A ==
Locations of the 2017–18 Belgian Second Amateur Division A teams

=== League table ===
Pos	Team	Pld	W	D	L	GF	GA	GD	Pts	Qualification or relegation
1	Rupel Boom (P)	30	19	4	7	74	49	+25	61	Promotion to the 2018–19 Belgian First Amateur Division
2	Mandel United	30	18	3	9	59	33	+26	57	Qualification for the Promotion play-offs VFV (Note: In theory four teams should take part in the Promotion play-offs VFV, namely the second placed team and the three period winners. Any vacant spots would be filled with the teams finishing highest in the league. However, besides Mandel United and Sint-Eloois-Winkel no other teams requested and received their licence to play in the Belgian First Amateur Division and hence two spots remain vacant.)
3	Sint-Eloois-Winkel	30	16	7	7	60	41	+19	55	Qualification for the Promotion play-offs VFV
4	Petegem	30	15	8	7	64	40	+24	53	
5	Westhoek	30	16	3	11	61	56	+5	51	
6	Sint-Niklaas	30	15	5	10	55	43	+12	50	
7	Temse	30	14	6	10	51	42	+9	48	
8	Harelbeke	30	12	7	11	45	42	+3	43	
9	Brakel	30	11	8	11	41	49	−8	41	
10	Gullegem	30	12	4	14	51	52	−1	40	
11	Gent-Zeehaven	30	12	1	17	47	59	−12	37	
12	Londerzeel	30	10	6	14	55	51	+4	36	
13	Ronse	30	7	12	11	33	44	−11	33	
14	Pepingen-Halle (R)	30	7	7	16	30	56	−26	28	Qualification for the relegation play-offs
15	Torhout (R)	30	7	5	18	36	67	−31	26	Relegation to the 2018–19 Belgian Third Amateur Division
16	Bornem (R)	30	5	2	23	28	66	−38	17	Relegation to the 2018–19 Belgian Third Amateur Division

Source: vbal4
Rules for classification: 1) Points; 2) Goal difference; 3) Goals scored.
(P) Promoted; (R) Relegated

== Belgian Second Amateur Division B ==
Locations of the 2017–18 Belgian Second Amateur Division B teams

=== League table ===
Pos	Team	Pld	W	D	L	GF	GA	GD	Pts	Qualification or relegation
1	Tessenderlo (P)	30	20	5	5	63	30	+33	65	Promotion to the 2018–19 Belgian First Amateur Division
2	Bocholt	30	17	6	7	57	42	+15	57	
3	Spouwen-Mopertingen	30	14	10	6	56	46	+10	52	
4	City Pirates	30	13	8	9	52	44	+8	47	
5	Wijgmaal	30	14	4	12	53	49	+4	46	
6	Vosselaar	30	11	11	8	49	35	+14	44	
7	Hades	30	13	4	13	46	42	+4	43	
8	Overijse	30	12	5	13	39	51	−12	41	
9	Cappellen	30	11	8	11	43	37	+6	41	
10	Duffel	30	11	7	12	46	46	0	40	
11	Turnhout	30	8	13	9	30	34	−4	37	
12	Hoogstraten	30	10	6	14	39	47	−8	36	
13	Hasselt	30	10	5	15	34	45	−11	35	Qualification for the Promotion play-offs VFV (Note: In theory four teams should take part in the Promotion play-offs VFV, namely the second placed team and the three period winners. Any vacant spots would be filled with the teams finishing highest in the league. This would mean Bocholt, Spouwen-Mopertingen, City Pirates and Wijgmaal would normally take part, however as only Hasselt requested and received their licence to play in the Belgian First Amateur Division the three other spots remain vacant.)
14	Zwarte Leeuw (R)	30	6	12	12	43	47	−4	30	Qualification for the relegation play-offs
15	Tienen (R)	30	8	4	18	39	61	−22	28	Relegation to the 2018–19 Belgian Third Amateur Division
16	Sint-Lenaarts (R)	30	6	4	20	33	66	−33	22	Relegation to the 2018–19 Belgian Third Amateur Division

Source: vbal4
Rules for classification: 1) Points; 2) Goal difference; 3) Goals scored.
(P) Promoted; (R) Relegated

== Belgian Second Amateur Division C ==
Locations of the 2017–18 Belgian Second Amateur Division C teams

=== League table ===
Pos	Team	Pld	W	D	L	GF	GA	GD	Pts	Qualification or relegation
1	RWDM (P)	28	25	1	2	84	19	+65	76	Promotion to the 2018–19 Belgian First Amateur Division
2	RFC Liège (P)	28	21	3	4	68	30	+38	66	Qualification for the Promotion play-offs ACFF (Note: In theory four teams should take part in the Promotion play-offs ACFF, namely the second placed team and the three period winners. Any vacant spots would be filled with the teams finishing highest in the league. This would mean FC Liège, Olympic Charleroi, Durbuy and Hamoir would normally take part, however the latter two teams have not requested (or received) their licence to play in the Belgian First Amateur Division. As only La Louvière Centre has received a licence from the other remaining teams, they will take part while the last spot remains vacant.)
3	Olympic Charleroi	28	16	6	6	53	37	+16	54	Qualification for the Promotion play-offs ACFF
4	Durbuy	28	13	6	9	40	37	+3	45	
5	Hamoir	28	13	5	10	44	43	+1	44	
6	La Louvière Centre	28	12	6	10	38	43	−5	42	Qualification for the Promotion play-offs ACFF
7	Walhain	28	9	10	9	38	44	−6	37	
8	Waremme	28	11	5	12	48	46	+2	38	
9	Acren-Lessines	28	9	7	12	44	46	−2	34	
10	Solières	28	9	8	11	37	41	−4	35	
11	Meux	28	8	7	13	48	55	−7	31	
12	Rebecq	28	8	7	13	41	51	−10	31	
13	Ciney (Note: Ciney might still be relegated depending on the result of the 2017–18 Belgian First Amateur Division. If the team participating in the Second Amateur Division Promotion play-offs Final is from the ACFF and relegates due to losing these play-offs, then in case the replacing team is from the VFV an extra team from the ACFF would be relegated, which would be Ciney based on their finishing position.)	28	5	9	14	35	48	−13	24	
14	Sprimont Comblain (R)	28	5	3	20	29	62	−33	18	Relegation to the 2018–19 Belgian Third Amateur Division
15	La Calamine (R)	28	3	3	22	25	70	−45	12	Relegation to the 2018–19 Belgian Third Amateur Division
16	WS Brussels (Note: WS Brussels was excluded from all competitions on 29 September 2017 and automatically placed in last position. If the club does not manage to pay its outstanding debts, its matricule will also be cancelled and the club will cease to exist.) (R)	0	0	0	0	0	0	0	0	Relegation to the 2018–19 Belgian Third Amateur Division

Source: vbal4
Rules for classification: 1) Points; 2) Goal difference; 3) Goals scored.
(P) Promoted; (R) Relegated

== Promotion play-offs ==
=== Promotion play-offs VFV ===
The teams finishing in second place in the Second Amateur Division A and Second Amateur Division B will take part in a promotion playoff first round together with three period winners from both divisions. These 8 teams from the VFV will play the first round of a promotion-playoff, with two teams qualifying for the Promotion play-offs Final. In division A, the first period was won by Petegem, the second by Mandel United and the third by champions Rupel Boom. In division B, champions Tessenderlo won all three periods.

In division A, only Mandel United and Sint-Eloois-Winkel received a license, meaning there were only two participants from this division instead of four. In division B, only Hasselt applied for a license in spite of finishing just 5 points clear of the relegation zone. The three other spots remained vacant. Overall this meant only three out of eight teams took part, with two teams qualifying for the Promotion play-offs Final. As a result of the draw, Sint-Eloois-Winkel received a bye and directly qualified for the play-offs Final.

6 May 2018
15:00

Mandel United	4–0	Hasselt
Lorthiois; Beyens	report

Gemeentelijk stadion, Ingelmunster

The winner of this match will qualify for the Promotion play-offs Final together with Sint-Eloois-Winkel.

=== Promotion play-offs ACFF ===
The team finishing in second place in the Second Amateur Division C will take part in the promotion playoff first round together with three period winners. These 4 teams will play the first round of a promotion-playoff, with the winner qualifying for the Promotion play-offs Final. While champions RWDM47 won all three periods which would meant the teams in positions 2 through 5 would take part in the playoffs, only three teams effectively received a license with the fourth place remaining vacant.

==== ACFF Round 1 ====
As a result of the draw, La Louvière-Centre received a bye into round 2.

4 May 2018
20:30

RFC Liège	2–1 (a.e.t.)	Olympic Charleroi
Kenne 58'; Electeur (red card) 105'; Vandebon 108' (pen.)		Kalincik (yellow card) 73' (yellow-red card) 80'; Sidibé 90+3'; Palmeri (yellow card) 49' (yellow-red card) 100'

Stade de Rocourt, Liège

==== ACFF Round 2 ====
9 May 2018
20:00

RFC Liège	1–0	La Louvière Centre
Vandebon 81'	Report

Stade de Rocourt, Liège

RFC Liège qualified for the Promotion play-offs Final.

=== Promotion play-offs Final ===
The two winners of the Promotion play-offs on the VFV side (Mandel United and Sint-Eloois-Winkel) and the winning team from the ACFF Promotion play-offs (RFC Liège) will play a final tournament together with the team that finished in 14th place in the 2017–18 Belgian First Amateur Division (Hamme). The winner of this play-off promotes to (or remains in) the 2018–19 Belgian First Amateur Division.

==== Final Round 1 ====
13 May 2018
16:00

Mandel United	0–2	RFC Liège
	Report	Jiyar 59'; Winandts 85'

Gemeentelijk stadion, Ingelmunster
17 May 2018
20:30

RFC Liège	1–0	Mandel United
Dethier 86'	Report

Stade de Rocourt, Liège

13 May 2018
15:00

Hamme	2–1	Sint-Eloois-Winkel
Dekuyper; D'Haeseleer		Goal

Hamme
17 May 2018
20:00

Sint-Eloois-Winkel	1–1	Hamme
Lutun 55'	Report	Claeys 90'

Gullegem

RFC Liège and Hamme qualified for the Promotion play-offs Final. Mandel United and Sint-Eloois-Winkel are eliminated and remain in the Belgian Second Amateur Division.

==== Final Round 2 ====
20 May 2018
15:00

Hamme	2–4	RFC Liège
Audin 3'; De Wilde 34'		Teruel 41'; Dethier 56'; Mombongo-Dues 75'; Electeur 81'

Hamme
27 May 2018
15:00

RFC Liège	2–1	Hamme
Mombongo-Dues 1'; Electeur 47'		Mariën 15'

Stade de Rocourt, Liège

RFC Liège won 6–3 on aggregate and as a result was promoted to the 2018–19 Belgian First Amateur Division. By losing, Hamme was relegated from the 2017–18 Belgian First Amateur Division to the 2018–19 Belgian Second Amateur Division.

== Relegation play-offs ==
The number of teams relegating from the Belgian Amateur Second Division depends on the number of teams of each wing (VFV and ACFF) relegating from the Belgian First Amateur Division.

In case the three automatic relegation spots in the 2017–18 Belgian First Amateur Division are filled by:

- 3 VFV teams, then one extra team from the VFV will need to be relegated from the 2017–18 Belgian Amateur Second Division to the 2018–19 Belgian Third Amateur Division.
- 2 VFV teams (and one ACFF), no extra teams will be relegated from the 2017–18 Belgian Amateur Second Division to the 2018–19 Belgian Third Amateur Division.
- 2 ACFF teams (and one VFV), then one extra team from the ACFF will need to be relegated from the 2017–18 Belgian Amateur Second Division to the 2018–19 Belgian Third Amateur Division.
- 3 ACFF teams, then two extra teams from the ACFF will need to be relegated from the 2017–18 Belgian Amateur Second Division to the 2018–19 Belgian Third Amateur Division.

Additionally, in case the team from the 2017–18 Belgian First Amateur Division taking part in the Promotion play-offs Final belongs to a different wing than the winner of the Promotion play-offs Final, then an additional team would be relegated of the same wing as the relegating team from the 2017–18 Belgian First Amateur Division.

As of the end of the regular competition, the number of extra relegations for the VFV would be zero, one or two, while for ACFF it would be zero or one.

=== Relegation play-offs VFV ===
The teams finishing 14th in divisions A and B play each other in a single match to avoid relegation.

6 May 2018
15:00

Pepingen-Halle	3–1	Zwarte Leeuw
Miceli; Ngadrira 44'; Morais De Almeida 85'	Report	Vanderheyden 66'

At the time of the match, it was yet uncertain how many teams from each wing would be relegated. In the end, with the relegations of Hamme, Berchem Sport and Patro Eisden Maasmechelen from the 2017–18 Belgian First Amateur Division and the addition bankruptcy of Lierse (playing in the 2017–18 Belgian First Division B), which are all VFV teams, both Zwarte Leeuw and Pepingen-Halle were eventually relegated.

=== Relegation play-offs ACFF ===
As there is only one division no playoff is organised. In case extra relegations were necessary, the teams finishing just above the relegation zone would have been relegated, starting from the bottom. With one possible extra relegation, Ciney needed to await the result of the Promotion play-offs but was eventually spared of relegation.
