= 2017–18 Belgian Third Amateur Division =

Belgian Third Amateur Division
- Season: 2017–18

The 2017–18 Belgian Third Amateur Division is the second season of the division in its current format, replacing the former Belgian Fourth Division.

== Team changes ==
=== In ===
- Menen, Grimbergen, Woluwe-Zaventem, Couvin-Mariembourg, Givry and Namur were all relegated from the 2016–17 Belgian Second Amateur Division.
- Ternesse, Termien, Melsele and Wingene were promoted as champions of the Flemish Belgian Provincial Leagues, respectively in Antwerp, Limburg, East Flanders and West Flanders.
- Binche, Stockay, Habay, Spy were promoted as champions of the Walloon Belgian Provincial Leagues, respectively in Hainaut, Liège, Luxembourg and Namur.
- Kampenhout was promoted as champion of the region matching the old Province of Brabant, comprising all Flemish and French speaking teams in both Flemish Brabant, Walloon Brabant and Brussels.
- Hoeilaart was the runner up of the Province of Brabant region and was also promoted as Halle folded as a team and an extra place became available.
- Bilzen Waltwilder, Heur-Tongeren, Herentals and Stekene were promoted through the interprovincial play-offs on VFV side.
- Visé and Braine were promoted through the interprovincial play-offs on ACFF side.

=== Out ===
- Ingelmunster was promoted after winning the 2016–17 Belgian Third Amateur Division A.
- Turnhout was promoted after winning the 2016–17 Belgian Third Amateur Division B.
- RWDM47 was promoted after winning the 2016–17 Belgian Third Amateur Division C.
- Durbuy was promoted after winning the 2016–17 Belgian Third Amateur Division D.
- City Pirates, Pepingen, Ronse, Sint-Lenaarts, Vosselaar were promoted as winners of the Third Amateur Division promotion play-offs VFV.
- Rebecq was promoted as winners of the Third Amateur Division promotion play-offs ACFF.
- Berlare, Sint-Gillis Waas, Zele, Helchteren, Betekom, Racing Mechelen, Profondeville, Warnant and Arlon were relegated to the Belgian Provincial Leagues.

=== Takeover ===
- Charleroi Fleurus was relegated from the 2016–17 Belgian Second Amateur Division but sold its matricule licence to an entrepreneur establishing a new club in La Louvière to revive the defunct club RAA La Louvière, the new club will be named RAAL La Louvière.

== Belgian Third Amateur Division A ==
Locations of the 2017–18 Belgian Third Amateur Division A teams

=== League table ===
Pos	Team	Pld	W	D	L	GF	GA	GD	Pts	Qualification or relegation
1	Menen (P)	30	19	5	6	66	35	+31	62	Promotion to the 2018–19 Belgian Second Amateur Division
2	Dikkelvenne (P)	30	18	4	8	71	36	+35	58	Qualification to Promotion play-offs VFV
3	Wingene	30	16	9	5	47	23	+24	57	Qualification to Promotion play-offs VFV
4	Eppegem (P)	30	16	7	7	60	42	+18	55	Qualification to Promotion play-offs VFV
5	Wetteren	30	14	8	8	46	38	+8	50	Qualification to Promotion play-offs VFV
6	Lebbeke	30	13	8	9	47	40	+7	47	
7	Melsele	30	12	7	11	52	44	+8	43	
8	Wervik	30	12	7	11	43	43	0	43	
9	Merelbeke	30	11	10	9	51	44	+7	43	
10	Wolvertem Merchtem	30	10	9	11	40	49	−9	39	
11	Lede	30	10	6	14	41	48	−7	36	
12	Stekene	30	9	8	13	43	51	−8	35	
13	Ninove (R)	30	8	8	14	45	57	−12	32	Qualification to relegation play-offs
14	Grimbergen (R)	30	7	5	18	34	62	−28	26	Relegation to the 2018–19 Belgian Provincial Leagues
15	Mariekerke (R)	30	6	8	16	38	55	−17	26	Relegation to the 2018–19 Belgian Provincial Leagues
16	Vlamertinge (R)	30	2	5	23	13	70	−57	11	Relegation to the 2018–19 Belgian Provincial Leagues

Source: https://www.vbal4.be/p010241z9.htm
(P) Promoted; (R) Relegated

== Belgian Third Amateur Division B ==
Locations of the 2017–18 Belgian Third Amateur Division B teams

=== League table ===
Pos	Team	Pld	W	D	L	GF	GA	GD	Pts	Qualification or relegation
1	Heur-Tongeren (P)	30	17	4	9	59	37	+22	55	Promotion to the 2018–19 Belgian Second Amateur Division
2	Wellen	30	15	10	5	53	31	+22	55	Qualification to Promotion play-offs VFV
3	Termien	30	16	6	8	60	39	+21	54	Qualification to Promotion play-offs VFV
4	Diegem (P)	30	15	5	10	61	43	+18	50	Qualification to Promotion play-offs VFV
5	Leopoldsburg	30	14	6	10	54	39	+15	48	Qualification to Promotion play-offs VFV
6	Bilzen	30	14	6	10	60	54	+6	48	
7	Nijlen	30	13	6	11	54	55	−1	45	
8	Esperanza Pelt	30	13	5	12	54	50	+4	44	
9	Woluwe-Zaventem	30	11	8	11	55	51	+4	41	
10	Houtvenne	30	11	7	12	60	59	+1	40	
11	Kampenhout	30	10	8	12	41	49	−8	38	
12	Ternesse	30	9	7	14	54	69	−15	34	
13	Diest (R)	30	9	5	16	41	66	−25	32	Qualification to relegation play-offs
14	Hoeilaart (R)	30	8	6	16	39	68	−29	30	Relegation to the 2018–19 Belgian Provincial Leagues
15	Herentals (R)	30	7	6	17	38	59	−21	27	Relegation to the 2018–19 Belgian Provincial Leagues
16	Sterrebeek (R)	30	6	9	15	40	54	−14	27	Relegation to the 2018–19 Belgian Provincial Leagues

(P) Promoted; (R) Relegated

== Belgian Third Amateur Division C ==
Locations of the 2017–18 Belgian Third Amateur Division C teams

=== League table ===
Pos	Team	Pld	W	D	L	GF	GA	GD	Pts	Qualification or relegation
1	La Louvière (P)	30	21	6	3	74	24	+50	69	Promotion to the 2018–19 Belgian Second Amateur Division
2	Francs Borains (P)	30	20	6	4	80	31	+49	66	Qualification to Promotion play-offs ACFF
3	Onhaye	30	18	2	10	66	47	+19	56	Qualification to Promotion play-offs ACFF
4	Tournai	30	16	7	7	45	27	+18	55	Qualification to Promotion play-offs ACFF
5	Couvin-Mariembourg (P)	30	16	6	8	61	43	+18	54	Qualification to Promotion play-offs ACFF
6	Binche	30	16	4	10	56	53	+3	52	
7	Wavre	30	15	7	8	58	47	+11	52	
8	Entité Manageoise	30	11	8	11	52	50	+2	41	
9	Albert Quevy-Mons	30	10	9	11	44	40	+4	39	
10	Jeunesse Tamines	30	10	7	13	46	56	−10	37	
11	Ganshoren	30	10	6	14	40	54	−14	36	
12	Léopold	30	9	5	16	47	50	−3	32	
13	Stade Brainois	30	8	5	17	35	52	−17	29	Qualification to relegation play-offs
14	Spy (R)	30	6	4	20	39	83	−44	22	Relegation to the 2018–19 Belgian Provincial Leagues
15	Solre (R)	30	4	8	18	35	67	−32	20	Relegation to the 2018–19 Belgian Provincial Leagues
16	Waterloo (R)	30	4	2	24	34	88	−54	14	Relegation to the 2018–19 Belgian Provincial Leagues

(P) Promoted; (R) Relegated

== Belgian Third Amateur Division D ==
Locations of the 2017–18 Belgian Third Amateur Division D teams

=== League table ===
Pos	Team	Pld	W	D	L	GF	GA	GD	Pts	Qualification or relegation
1	Tilleur (P)	30	21	4	5	73	24	+49	67	Promotion to the 2018–19 Belgian Second Amateur Division
2	Visé (P)	30	19	7	4	83	32	+51	64	Qualification to Promotion play-offs ACFF
3	Stockay	30	17	7	6	59	33	+26	58	Qualification to Promotion play-offs ACFF
4	Aische	30	14	8	8	53	39	+14	50	Qualification to Promotion play-offs ACFF
5	Herstal	30	12	11	7	76	59	+17	47	Qualification to Promotion play-offs ACFF
6	Longlier	30	13	6	11	46	49	−3	45	
7	Aywaille	30	13	4	13	60	59	+1	43	
8	Givry	30	11	10	9	66	48	+18	43	
9	Richelle	30	11	9	10	58	42	+16	42	
10	Verlaine	30	10	10	10	51	45	+6	40	
11	Huy	30	10	9	11	51	52	−1	39	
12	Mormont	30	10	8	12	45	53	−8	38	
13	Bertrix	30	10	6	14	36	61	−25	36	Qualification to relegation play-offs
14	Habay (R)	30	8	6	16	41	54	−13	30	Relegation to the 2018–19 Belgian Provincial Leagues
15	Namur (Note: UR Namur has been sanctioned by the control commission of the Belgian FA for financial irregularities and outstanding debts to former players and staff. The team will face relegation and start the 2018–19 season with a penalty of 9 points. If they had achieved promotion during the 2017–18 season, the club would have remained in the Belgian Third Amateur Division, however as they relegated, they immediately dropped two levels, not one.) (R)	30	2	4	24	31	111	−80	10	Relegation to the 2018–19 Belgian Provincial Leagues
16	Cointe (R)	30	1	7	22	25	93	−68	10	Relegation to the 2018–19 Belgian Provincial Leagues

(P) Promoted; (R) Relegated

== Championship matches ==
Both the two VFV and two ACFF teams winning their leagues will play a title match to determine the overall VFV and ACFF champions of the Belgian Third Division. The overall ACFF champion will be determined over two legs while Menen and Heur-Tongeren will play for the VFV title in a single match at the stadium of Menen (determined by draw). There will be no match between the overall VFV and ACFF champions.

=== Championship match VFV ===
6 May 2018
15:00

Menen	0–5 FF	Heur-Tongeren

Menen

The match was not played as Menen forfeited the game, Heur-Tongeren is the official VFV champion.

=== Championship match ACFF ===
==== First leg ====
12 May 2018
15:00

Tilleur	1–1	La Louvière
Kinif 19'		Falzone 30'

Liège

==== Second leg ====
19 May 2018
20:00

La Louvière	2–2	Tilleur
Phiri 26'; Maeyens 90+1'		Falcione 32'; Janin 87'

La Louvière

With an aggregate score of 3-3, Tilleur won the encounter on away goals and was crowned overall ACFF champion of the 2017–18 Belgian Third Amateur Division.

== Promotion play-offs ==
=== Promotion play-offs VFV ===
The teams finishing in second place in the Third Amateur Division A and Third Amateur Division B will take part in a promotion playoff first round together with three period winners from both divisions. These 8 teams from the VFV will play the first round of a promotion-playoff, with two teams promoting to the 2018–19 Belgian Second Amateur Division. Depending on the number of VFV teams relegating from the 2017–18 Belgian First Amateur Division and possible mergers and bankruptcies, more teams might get promoted. As a result, the two winning teams in the VFV Round 2 immediately received promotion, while the other teams continued the play-offs to determine the order in which possible further places would be awarded.

In Division A, champions Menen and second placed Dikkelvenne each won one periods, allowing the next three teams in the league to take part: Wingene, Eppegem and Wetteren. In Division B, the two periods were won by champion Heur-Tongeren while second placed Wellen won the remaining period. Hence the teams in overall positions 3 to 5 took part: Termien, Diegem Sport and Leopoldsburg.

==== VFV Round 1 ====
5 May 2018
20:00

Dikkelvenne	3–0	Wellen
Jabar; Martens; Pollet

Dikkelvenne
6 May 2018
15:00

Wingene	1–2	Diegem

Wingene
6 May 2018
15:00

Leopoldsburg	1–1 (a.e.t.)	Termien
Penalties
	2–4

Leopoldsburg
6 May 2018
16:00

Eppegem	4–3 (a.e.t.)	Wetteren

Eppegem

The four winners will continue into the VFV Round 2 where one extra place is available.

==== VFV Round 2 ====
10 May 2018
15:00

Diegem	3–0	Termien
Gajanovic 10'; Benamar 66'; Frick 80'

Diegem
10 May 2018
18:00

Dikkelvenne	1–2	Eppegem

Dikkelvenne

Diegem and Eppegem were promoted to the 2018–19 Belgian Second Amateur Division, while Dikkelvenne and Termien moved to the VFV Round 3 to play for the order on the waiting list in case any remaining places came up.

==== VFV Round 3 ====
13 May 2018
15:00

Dikkelvenne	2–0	Termien
Van Damme 49'; Martens 77'	Report

Dikkelvenne

Following the bankruptcy of Lierse in the Belgian First Division B, an extra spot became available. As the winner of round 3, Dikkelvenne was promoted to take up this free spot. Termien remains in the Belgian Third Amateur Division.

=== Promotion play-offs ACFF ===
The team finishing in second place in the Third Amateur Division C and Third Amateur Division D will take part in a promotion playoff first round together with three period winners from both divisions. These 8 teams from the ACFF will play the first round of a promotion-playoff, with normally one team promoting to the 2018–19 Belgian Second Amateur Division although more places could come up which is why the third round also features a match between the losers of the second round.

In Division C, Couvin-Mariembourg and Onhaye managed to each win one period. As the other period was won by champions La Louvière, the remaining spots in the play-offs went to second placed Francs Borains and fourth placed Tournai. In Division D, the champions Tilleur had won two periods, the other went to Visé who were joined in the play-offs by the teams finishing 3rd to 5th, Stockay, Aische and Herstal.

==== ACFF Round 1 ====
5 May 2018
20:00

Onhaye	2–3	Couvin-Mariembourg
Gilain 29'; Kembi 38'	Report	Hallaert 28'; Meerpoel 87'; Maistriaux 90'

Onhaye
6 May 2018
15:00

Tournai	1–4	Francs Borains

Tournai
6 May 2018
15:00

Herstal	0–2	Aische

Herstal
6 May 2018
15:00

Stockay	2–3	Visé

Liège

The four winners moved on to Round 2 while the losers are eliminated.

==== ACFF Round 2 ====
13 May 2018
15:00

Francs Borains	4–0	Aische

Boussu
13 May 2018
15:00

Visé	2–0	Couvin-Mariembourg

Visé

The winners would normally move on to Round 3 to play for promotion, however this season two teams were promoted directly and therefore the match was not necessary as both Francs Borains and Visé were promoted. The losers play a match to determine third place in case extra promotion places would come up.

==== Third place match ====
19 May 2018
20:00

Aische	1–3	Couvin-Mariembourg

Aische-en-Refail

As one extra spot became available, Couvin-Mariembourg was also promoted. Aische remained in the Belgian Third Amateur Division.

== Relegation play-offs ==
=== ACFF ===
6 May 2018
15:00

Bertrix	3–1	Stade Brainois

Bertrix

As no teams from the ACFF wing relegated from the 2017–18 Belgian First Amateur Division, both teams were eventually spared from relegation.

=== VFV ===
6 May 2018
15:00

Ninove	4–1	Diest
Verhaeghe 10'; Amazou 27'; Van Den Branden 70'; Lepage 90+5'	Report	Commers 12'

Ninove

At the time of the match, it was yet uncertain how many teams from each wing would be relegated. In the end, with the relegations of Hamme, Berchem Sport and Patro Eisden Maasmechelen from the 2017–18 Belgian First Amateur Division and the addition bankruptcy of Lierse (playing in the 2017–18 Belgian First Division B), which are all VFV teams, both Diest and Ninove were eventually relegated.
