= Dylan Vanwelkenhuysen =

Belgian footballer

Personal information
- Date of birth: 20 January 1992 (age 34)
- Place of birth: Sint-Truiden, Belgium
- Height: 1.82 m (6 ft 0 in)
- Position: Forward

Team information
- Current team: KVV Zepperen Brustem
- Number: 33

Senior career*
Years	Team	Apps	(Gls)
2011–2014	Sint-Truiden	16	(0)
2012	→ ASV Geel (loan)	14	(7)
2012–2013	→ Bocholt VV (loan)	30	(19)
2014–2015	Woluwe-Zaventem	34	(4)
2015	Alashkert	4	(0)
2015–2016	Bocholt VV	35	(8)
2016–2018	Thes Sport		
2018–2019	KVK Wellen		
2019–2020	Tienen	20	(8)
2020–	KVV Zepperen Brustem	42	(20)
- * Club domestic league appearances and goals as of 15 January 2026

Dylan Vanwelkenhuysen (born 20 January 1992) is a Belgian professional footballer who plays as a forward for KVV Zepperen Brustem.

== Career ==
Vanwelkenhuysen started his senior career with Sint-Truidense V.V. in 2011. In 2011, he signed for their senior team in the Belgian First Division A, where he made sixteen appearances and scored zero goals. After that, he played for Belgian clubs AS Verbroedering Geel, Bocholter VV, and K.V. Woluwe-Zaventem, and Armenian club Alashkert, and Belgian clubs K.V.V. Thes Sport Tessenderlo, KVK Wellen and K.V.K. Tienen-Hageland, where he now plays.

== Personal life ==
Vanwelkenhuysen has working for Nike in his home country.
