= Imad Zmimer =

French footballer (born 2000)

Personal information
- Date of birth: 9 August 2000 (age 26)
- Place of birth: Tourcoing, France
- Position: Forward

Team information
- Current team: RFC Mandel United
- Number: 17

Youth career
- US Tourcoing
- ES Roncq
- Mouscron
- Zulte Waregem
- 2015–2018: Kortrijk

Senior career*
Years	Team	Apps	(Gls)
2018–2019	Cavese	1	(0)
2019	→ Savoia (loan)		
2020–2021	AO Tsilivi		
2021–2022	KSK Geluwe		
2022–2023	Sassport Boezinge		
2023–	RFC Mandel United	3	(0)
- * Club domestic league appearances and goals as of 14:43, 15 September 2023 (UTC)

Imad Zmimer (born 9 August 2000) is a French professional footballer who plays as a forward for Belgian club Sassport Boezinge.

== Club career ==
Born in Tourcoing, Zmimer passed through the academies of US Tourcoing and ES Roncq in his native France, as well as Mouscron, Zulte Waregem and Kortrijk in Belgium. He moved to Italy to sign for Cavese in 2018. Having failed to break into the Cavese first team, he was loaned to Savoia in early 2019.

After a short spell in Greece with AO Tsilivi, Zmimer returned to Belgium in 2021, signing with KSK Geluwe. The following year, he was with Sassport Boezinge, where he scored a goal against rivals KSC Blankenberge.

== Career statistics ==
=== Club ===
As of 16 August 2021

Club	Season	League			National Cup		League Cup		Other		Total	
Club	Season	Division	Apps	Goals	Apps	Goals	Apps	Goals	Apps	Goals	Apps	Goals
Cavese	2018–19	Serie C	1	0	0	0	1 (Note: Appearances in the Coppa Italia Serie C)	0	0	0	2	0
RFC Mandel United	2023–24	Belgian Division 2	3	0	0	0	–		0	0	3	0
Career total			4	0	0	0	1	0	0	0	5	0
