= Godfroid =

Godfroid is a surname. Notable people with the surname include:

- Emmanuel Godfroid (born 1972), Belgian former footballer
- Steven Godfroid (born 1990), Belgian footballer
