= Tibeau Swinnen =

Belgian footballer (born 1995)

Personal information
- Full name: Tibeau Hugo Swinnen
- Date of birth: 11 January 1995 (age 31)
- Place of birth: Diest, Belgium
- Height: 1.75 m (5 ft 9 in)
- Position: Midfielder

Team information
- Current team: Thes
- Number: 8

Youth career
- Genk

Senior career*
Years	Team	Apps	(Gls)
2013–2018	FC Eindhoven	112	(3)
2018–2020	Helmond Sport	63	(6)
2020–2022	Lierse Kempenzonen	38	(0)
2022–	Thes	129	(9)
- * Club domestic league appearances and goals as of 3 May 2026

Tibeau Hugo Swinnen (born 11 January 1995) is a Belgian footballer who plays as a midfielder for Thes.
