= Steven Godfroid =

Rwandan footballer

Personal information
- Full name: Steven Emmanuel Godfroid Kunduma
- Date of birth: 16 March 1990 (age 36)
- Place of birth: Charleroi, Belgium
- Height: 1.80 m (5 ft 11 in)
- Position: Midfielder

Team information
- Current team: KSV Temse
- Number: 6

Senior career*
Years	Team	Apps	(Gls)
2009–2011	Olympic Charleroi	28	(1)
2011–2012	Jeunesse Turque		
2012–2014	Union Saint-Gilloise	41	(2)
2014–2015	Royal Francs-Borains		
2015–2019	Woluwe-Zaventem	30	(0)
2019–	KSV Temse	6	(1)

International career
2012–	Rwanda	2	(0)
- * Club domestic league appearances and goals as of 20:52, 27 October 2019 (UTC)

Steven Emmanuel Godfroid Kunduma (born 16 March 1990) is a footballer who plays for Belgian club KSV Temse as a midfielder. Born in Belgium, he represents Rwanda at international level.

== Career ==
Godfroid has played club football in Belgium for Charleroi, Jeunesse Turque and Saint-Gilloise. Godfroid joined KSV Temse ahead of the 2019–20 season.

He made his international debut for Rwanda in 2012, and has appeared in FIFA World Cup qualifying matches.
