= Carlo Damman =

Belgian footballer

Personal information
- Full name: Carlo Damman
- Date of birth: 18 March 1993 (age 33)
- Place of birth: Belgium
- Height: 1.81 m (5 ft 11 1/2 in)
- Position: Right-back

Team information
- Current team: Knokke

Youth career
- –2013: Zulte Waregem

Senior career*
Years	Team	Apps	(Gls)
2013–2019	KSV Roeselare	135	(0)
2020–	Knokke	0	(0)
- * Club domestic league appearances and goals as of 16:59, 24 March 2020 (UTC)

Carlo Damman (born 18 March 1993) is a Belgian footballer who currently plays for Knokke in the Belgian Second Amateur Division as a right-back.

== Career ==
=== Knokke ===
Having played for KSV Roeselare since 2013, Damman's contract was terminated by mutual agreement on 6 November 2019. He then joined R. Knokke F.C. on 3 February 2020 on a deal until the summer 2021.
