= 2016–17 Belgian Second Amateur Division =

Belgian Second Amateur Division
- Season: 2016–17
- Champions: Knokke, Berchem Sport and Châtelet
- Promoted: Knokke, Berchem Sport, Châtelet and Aalst
- Relegated: Halle, Menen, Grimbergen, Woluwe-Zaventem, Couvin-Mariembourg, Givry, Charleroi Fleurus and Namur

The 2016–17 Belgian Second Amateur Division is the inaugural season of the division in its current format, as it replaces the former Belgian Third Division and is now placed at the fourth-tier of football in Belgium.

The division consists of three separate leagues, each containing 16 teams. Leagues A and B consist of teams with a license from the Voetbalfederatie Vlaanderen (VFV, the Dutch speaking wing of the Belgian FA), while league C contains teams with a license from the Association des Clubs Francophones de Football (ACFF, the French speaking wing of the RBFA). The champions from each of the three leagues will promote to the 2017–18 Belgian First Amateur Division. The fixtures were announced on 5 July 2016.

For the inaugural season the following teams will participate:

- The 14 teams in each of the groups A and B of the 2015–16 Belgian Third Division that either did not apply for a Belgian remunerated football license, did not qualify in the top two for direct promotion or did not win promotion through the promotion play-offs.
- 20 teams promoted from the 2015–16 Belgian Fourth Division.

== Belgian Second Amateur Division A ==
Locations of the 2016–17 Belgian Second Amateur Division A teams

=== League table ===
Pos	Team	Pld	W	D	L	GF	GA	GD	Pts	Promotion or relegation
1	Knokke (P)	30	23	3	4	73	25	+48	72	Promotion to the 2017–18 Belgian First Amateur Division
2	Petegem (Note: Petegem, Izegem and Temse did not apply for (or were not awarded) a Belgian remunerated football license and are thus not allowed to play in the 2017-18 Belgian First Amateur Division. As a result, the vacant places in the promotion play-offs VFV were taken by the highest finishers not already eligible: Brakel and Gent-Zeehaven.)	30	17	7	6	60	44	+16	58	
3	Aalst (P)	30	17	5	8	55	37	+18	56	Qualification to Promotion play-offs VFV
4	Izegem	30	16	5	9	53	42	+11	53	
5	Sint-Eloois-Winkel	30	15	8	7	55	30	+25	53	Qualification to Promotion play-offs VFV
6	Brakel	30	12	7	11	59	51	+8	43	Qualification to Promotion play-offs VFV
7	Temse	30	13	3	14	38	45	−7	42	
8	Gent-Zeehaven	30	11	8	11	46	43	+3	41	Qualification to Promotion play-offs VFV
9	Torhout	30	11	6	13	36	45	−9	39	
10	Gullegem	30	10	7	13	46	52	−6	37	
11	Sint-Niklaas	30	9	8	13	45	49	−4	35	
12	Harelbeke	30	10	4	16	36	45	−9	34	
13	Westhoek	30	9	7	14	40	56	−16	34	
14	Bornem	30	8	10	12	31	39	−8	34	Qualification to relegation play-offs
15	Halle (R)	30	5	8	17	27	55	−28	23	Relegation to the 2017–18 Belgian Third Amateur Division
16	Menen (R)	30	4	4	22	35	77	−42	16	Relegation to the 2017–18 Belgian Third Amateur Division

Updated to match(es) played on 13 May 2017. Source: https://www.soccerway.com/belgium/second-amateur-division-group-vfv-a-2016-2017/results/
Rules for classification: 1) points; 2) goal difference; 3) number of goals scored.
(P) Promoted; (R) Relegated

== Belgian Second Amateur Division B ==
Locations of the 2016–17 Belgian Second Amateur Division B teams

=== League table ===
Pos	Team	Pld	W	D	L	GF	GA	GD	Pts	Promotion or relegation
1	Berchem Sport (P)	30	20	8	2	65	24	+41	68	Promotion to the 2017–18 Belgian First Amateur Division
2	Tessenderlo	30	21	3	6	61	38	+23	66	Qualification to Promotion play-offs VFV
3	Rupel Boom	30	15	7	8	55	38	+17	52	Qualification to Promotion play-offs VFV
4	Spouwen-Mopertingen (Note: Besides Berchem Sport, Tessenderlo and Rupel-Boom, no other teams applied for (or were awarded) a Belgian remunerated football license although several were eligible to participate based on their finishing position. As a result, these teams are not allowed to play in the 2017-18 Belgian First Amateur Division and therefore two places in the promotion play-offs VFV were vacant.)	30	15	5	10	54	56	−2	50	
5	Wijgmaal	30	12	8	10	45	42	+3	44	
6	Bocholt	30	10	11	9	44	39	+5	41	
7	Zwarte Leeuw	30	12	4	14	39	56	−17	40	
8	Londerzeel	30	10	8	12	46	39	+7	38	
9	Hoogstraten	30	11	4	15	51	60	−9	37	
10	Hades	30	11	4	15	45	60	−15	37	
11	Overijse	30	11	3	16	53	59	−6	36	
12	Cappellen	30	8	12	10	41	42	−1	36	
13	Duffel	30	10	5	15	53	56	−3	35	
14	Tienen-Hageland	30	8	6	16	29	45	−16	30	Qualification to relegation play-offs
15	Grimbergen (R)	30	7	8	15	35	46	−11	29	Relegation to the 2017–18 Belgian Third Amateur Division
16	Woluwe-Zaventem (R)	30	7	8	15	46	62	−16	29	Relegation to the 2017–18 Belgian Third Amateur Division

Updated to match(es) played on 13 May 2017. Source: https://www.soccerway.com/belgium/second-amateur-division-group-vfv-b-2016-2017/results/
Rules for classification: 1) points; 2) goal difference; 3) number of goals scored.
(P) Promoted; (R) Relegated

== Belgian Second Amateur Division C ==
Locations of the 2016–17 Belgian Second Amateur Division C teams

=== League table ===
Pos	Team	Pld	W	D	L	GF	GA	GD	Pts	Promotion or relegation
1	Châtelet (P)	30	21	7	2	67	32	+35	70	Promotion to the 2017–18 Belgian First Amateur Division
2	RFC Liège	30	19	8	3	66	30	+36	65	Qualification to Promotion play-offs ACFF
3	Olympic Charleroi	30	15	6	9	61	46	+15	51	Qualification to Promotion play-offs ACFF
4	La Louvière Centre	30	13	11	6	54	35	+19	50	Qualification to Promotion play-offs ACFF
5	Hamoir (Note: Besides RFC Liège, Olympic Charleroi and La Louvière Centre, no other teams applied for (or were awarded) a Belgian remunerated football license although several were eligible to participate based on their finishing position. As a result, these teams are not allowed to play in the 2017-18 Belgian First Amateur Division and therefore one place in the promotion play-offs ACFF was vacant.)	30	12	8	10	50	49	+1	44	
6	Acrenoise	30	12	6	12	48	48	0	42	
7	Solières	30	11	9	10	52	48	+4	42	
8	Walhain	30	11	8	11	52	53	−1	41	
9	Union La Calamine	30	11	7	12	65	59	+6	40	
10	Waremme	30	12	2	16	60	58	+2	38	
11	Ciney	30	9	10	11	56	57	−1	37	
12	Meux	30	10	6	14	53	51	+2	36	
13	Couvin-Mariembourg (R)	30	9	6	15	54	66	−12	33	Relegation to the 2017–18 Belgian Third Amateur Division
14	Givry (R)	30	7	9	14	39	60	−21	30	Relegation to the 2017–18 Belgian Third Amateur Division
15	Charleroi Fleurus (R)	30	6	8	16	37	77	−40	26	Relegation to the 2017–18 Belgian Third Amateur Division
16	Namur (R)	30	3	7	20	32	77	−45	16	Relegation to the 2017–18 Belgian Third Amateur Division

Updated to match(es) played on 16 May 2017. Source: https://www.soccerway.com/belgium/second-amateur-division-group-acff-2016-2017/results/
Rules for classification: 1) points; 2) goal difference; 3) number of goals scored.
(P) Promoted; (R) Relegated

== Promotion play-offs ==
=== Promotion play-offs VFV ===
The teams finishing in second place in the Second Amateur Division A and Second Amateur Division B will take part in a promotion playoff first round together with three period winners from both divisions. These 8 teams from the VFV will play the first round of a promotion-playoff, with two teams qualifying for the Promotion play-offs Final. In division A, the first period was won by Petegem, while the second and third periods were won by Knokke. In division B, Tessenderlo won the first period, while periods two and three were won by Berchem Sport.

In division A, with the promotion of Knokke and the fact that Petegem did not apply for a remunerated license, the four participants were simply the highest finishers in the standings that had applied for a license: Aalst (3rd), Sint-Eloois-Winkel (5th), Brakel (6th) and Gent-Zeehaven (8th). In division B, no teams outside the top two applied for a license except for Rupel Boom. As a result only Tessenderlo and Rupel Boom took place in the play-offs while the two other places were not used. Therefore in the draw for round one of these play-offs, two teams received a bye.

==== VFV Round 1 ====
As a result of the draw, both Brakel and Gent-Zeehaven received byes into round 2.

7 May 2017
15:00

Rupel Boom	0–2	Tessenderlo
	Report	Vanwelkenhuysen 4'; Bennassar 85'

Gemeentelijk parkstadion, Boom
Referee: Robin Lefever
7 May 2017
15:00

Sint-Eloois-Winkel	0–4	Aalst
	Report	Yala Lusala 7'; De Rock 14'; F. Geenens 66'; Mitu 72'

Sportpark Terschueren, Sint-Eloois-Winkel

==== VFV Round 2 ====
11 May 2017
20:30

Aalst	1–0	Gent-Zeehaven
De Rock 67'	Report

Pierre Cornelisstadion, Aalst
11 May 2017
20:30

Brakel	2–2 (a.e.t.)	Tessenderlo
Kaj Knipping; Delie	Report	Vanwelkenhuysen; Van Oudenhove (pen.)
Penalties
	4–3

Olsa Stadion, Brakel

Aalst and Brakel qualified for the Promotion play-offs Final.

=== Promotion play-offs ACFF ===
The team finishing in second place in the Second Amateur Division C will take part in the promotion playoff first round together with three period winners. These 4 teams will play the first round of a promotion-playoff, with the winner qualifying for the Promotion play-offs Final. The period winners were RFC Liège (periods 1 and 3) and overall champions Châtelet.

As only Olympic Charleroi and La Louvière-Centre had received a remunerated license, only three teams played the play-offs instead of four, resulting in one team receiving a bye into round 2.

==== ACFF Round 1 ====
As a result of the draw, RFC Liège received a bye into round 2.

6 May 2017
20:00

Olympic Charleroi	2–2 (a.e.t.)	La Louvière Centre
Jatta 40'; Khaïda 92'	Report	Sbaa 61', 82'
Penalties
	6–5

Stade de la Neuville, Montignies-sur-Sambre

==== ACFF Round 2 ====
10 May 2017
20:00

RFC Liège	2–1	Olympic Charleroi
Bruggeman 2'; Ezzahri 89'	Report	Giorlando 54'

Stade de Rocourt, Liège

RFC Liège qualified for the Promotion play-offs Final.

=== Promotion play-offs Final ===
The two winners of the Promotion play-offs on the VFV side (Aalst and Brakel) and the winning team from the ACFF Promotion play-offs (RFC Liège) will play a final tournament together with the team that finished in 13th place in the 2016–17 Belgian First Amateur Division, Hasselt. The winner of this play-off promotes to (or remains in) the 2017–18 Belgian First Amateur Division.

==== Final Round 1 ====
14 May 2017
15:00

Hasselt	1–3	Aalst
Sidibe 54'	Report	Mitu 7', 68'; F. Geenens 44'

Stedelijk Sportstadion Hasselt, Hasselt
17 May 2017
20:30

Aalst	2–3 (a.e.t.)	Hasselt
Van Hoevelen 15'; Baras 107'		Sidibe 43'; Jarju 46'; Bilican 55'

Pierre Cornelisstadion, Aalst

14 May 2017
15:00

Brakel	3–1	RFC Liège
De Lange 8'; Haezebroeck 69'; Delie 80'	Report	Ezzahri 19'

Olsa Stadion, Brakel
17 May 2017
20:30

RFC Liège	3–1 (a.e.t.)	Brakel
Teruel 15'; Ezzahri 38', 90' (pen.)	Report	Delie 73'
Penalties
	4–2

Stade de Rocourt, Liège

Aalst and RFC Liège qualified for the Promotion play-offs Final. By not progressing, Hasselt relegated from the Belgian First Amateur Division.

==== Final Round 2 ====
21 May 2017
15:00

Aalst	0–1	RFC Liège
		Mauclet 87'

Pierre Cornelisstadion, Aalst
28 May 2017
15:00

RFC Liège	1–2	Aalst
Ezzahri 90+1'		Mitu 56'; Diarra 75'

Stade de Rocourt, Liège

2–2 on aggregate. Aalst promoted to the 2017–18 Belgian First Amateur Division on the away goals rule.

== Relegation play-offs ==
7 May 2017
14:00

Bornem	1–4	Tienen-Hageland
Hermans 2'	Report	Singh 13' (pen.); Grancea 43'; Haroun 84'; Eboigbe 88'

Stadion Het Breeven, Bornem

Before the match, it was not known whether an extra VFV team would be relegated, which depended on the result of the promotion play-offs. If an ACFF team won the promotion play-offs, then an extra VFV team would be relegated. By winning the match, Tienen-Hageland was sure of avoiding relegation, while losing team Bornem were now dependent on the result of the only ACFF team in contention for promotion, RFC Liège. On 28 May 2017, RFC Liège lost the final match of the promotion play-off, resulting in Bornem being saved and avoiding relegation to the Belgian Third Amateur Division.
