= 2016–17 Belgian Third Amateur Division =

Belgian Third Amateur Division
- Season: 2016–17
- Champions: Ingelmunster, Turnhout, RWDM47 and Durbuy
- Promoted: Ingelmunster, Turnhout, RWDM47, Durbuy, Pepingen, Ronse, City Pirates, Sint-Lenaarts, Vosselaar and Rebecq
- Relegated: Berlare, Sint-Gillis Waas, Zele, Helson Helchteren, Betekom, KRC Mechelen, Profondeville, Warnant and Arlon

The 2016–17 Belgian Third Amateur Division was the inaugural season of the division in its current format, replacing the former Belgian Fourth Division and now placed at the fifth-tier of football in Belgium.

The division consists of four separate leagues, leagues A and B consist of teams with a license from the Voetbalfederatie Vlaanderen (VFV, the Dutch speaking wing of the Belgian FA) and contain 16 teams each, while leagues C and D contain teams with a license from the Association des Clubs Francophones de Football (ACFF, the French speaking wing of the RBFA) and contain 14 teams each. The champions from each of the four leagues will promote to the 2017–18 Belgian Second Amateur Division. The fixtures were announced on 5 July 2016.

For the inaugural season the following teams participated:

- The two teams finishing last in groups A and B of the 2015–16 Belgian Third Division.
- 35 teams in the groups A through D of the 2015–16 Belgian Fourth Division that either did not qualify in the top three for direct promotion, did not win promotion through the promotion play-offs or dissolved.
- 23 teams promoted from the Belgian Provincial Leagues.

== Belgian Third Amateur Division A ==
Locations of the 2016–17 Belgian Third Amateur Division A teams

=== League table ===
Pos	Team	Pld	W	D	L	GF	GA	GD	Pts	Qualification or relegation
1	Ingelmunster (Note: Although OMS Ingelmunster officially received promotion, the team will cease to exist and instead merge with KFC Izegem, playing in the Belgian Second Amateur Division, to become Mandel United. As a result, one extra promotion spot became available in the Promotion play-offs VFV.) (C, P)	30	22	5	3	71	33	+38	71	Promotion to the 2017–18 Belgian Second Amateur Division
2	Wetteren	30	20	2	8	58	37	+21	62	Qualification to Promotion play-offs VFV
3	Pepingen (P)	30	16	7	7	50	38	+12	55	Qualification to Promotion play-offs VFV
4	Ronse (P)	30	16	5	9	54	33	+21	53	Qualification to Promotion play-offs VFV
5	Dikkelvenne	30	12	11	7	56	45	+11	47	Qualification to Promotion play-offs VFV
6	Ninove	30	13	5	12	59	43	+16	44	
7	Mariekerke	30	11	6	13	49	51	−2	39	
8	Wolvertem Merchtem	30	11	6	13	38	52	−14	39	
9	Lebbeke	30	10	9	11	49	43	+6	39	
10	Lede	30	10	7	13	53	52	+1	37	
11	Merelbeke	30	9	10	11	40	46	−6	37	
12	Wervik	30	9	9	12	41	44	−3	36	
13	Vlamertinge	30	8	7	15	37	46	−9	31	Qualification to relegation play-offs
14	Berlare (R)	30	8	6	16	31	55	−24	30	Relegation to the 2017–18 Belgian Provincial Leagues
15	Sint-Gillis Waas (R)	30	4	12	14	24	49	−25	24	Relegation to the 2017–18 Belgian Provincial Leagues
16	Zele (R)	30	3	9	18	25	68	−43	18	Relegation to the 2017–18 Belgian Provincial Leagues

(C) Champions; (P) Promoted; (R) Relegated

== Belgian Third Amateur Division B ==
Locations of the 2016–17 Belgian Third Amateur Division B teams

=== League table ===
Pos	Team	Pld	W	D	L	GF	GA	GD	Pts	Qualification or relegation
1	Turnhout (C, P)	30	19	6	5	74	38	+36	63	Promotion to the 2017–18 Belgian Second Amateur Division
2	City Pirates (P)	30	18	5	7	80	40	+40	59	Qualification to Promotion play-offs VFV
3	Sint-Lenaarts (P)	30	15	9	6	45	32	+13	54	Qualification to Promotion play-offs VFV
4	Diegem	30	14	8	8	54	49	+5	50	Qualification to Promotion play-offs VFV
5	Vosselaar (P)	30	15	4	11	55	49	+6	49	Qualification to Promotion play-offs VFV
6	Esperanza Pelt	30	13	6	11	49	44	+5	45	
7	Houtvenne	30	13	5	12	60	53	+7	44	
8	Eppegem	30	12	7	11	49	49	0	43	
9	Leopoldsburg	30	10	9	11	38	38	0	39	
10	Nijlen	30	10	8	12	31	36	−5	38	
11	Wellen	30	10	6	14	48	42	+6	36	
12	Sterrebeek	30	9	9	12	37	40	−3	36	
13	Diest	30	9	7	14	46	67	−21	34	Qualification to relegation play-offs
14	Helchteren (R)	30	9	5	16	29	44	−15	32	Relegation to the 2017–18 Belgian Provincial Leagues
15	Betekom (R)	30	9	5	16	45	67	−22	32	Relegation to the 2017–18 Belgian Provincial Leagues
16	Racing Mechelen (R)	30	2	7	21	29	81	−52	13	Relegation to the 2017–18 Belgian Provincial Leagues

(C) Champions; (P) Promoted; (R) Relegated

== Belgian Third Amateur Division C ==
Locations of the 2016–17 Belgian Third Amateur Division C teams

=== League table ===
Pos	Team	Pld	W	D	L	GF	GA	GD	Pts	Qualification or relegation
1	RWDM47 (C, P)	26	19	4	3	72	31	+41	61	Promotion to the 2017–18 Belgian Second Amateur Division
2	Rebecq (P)	26	19	4	3	58	24	+34	61	Qualification to Promotion play-offs ACFF
3	Francs Borains	26	18	6	2	63	21	+42	60	Qualification to Promotion play-offs ACFF
4	Albert Quevy-Mons	26	13	8	5	54	28	+26	47	Qualification to Promotion play-offs ACFF
5	Tournai	26	11	7	8	55	46	+9	40	Qualification to Promotion play-offs ACFF
6	Onhaye	26	11	4	11	34	44	−10	37	
7	Manage	26	9	8	9	34	35	−1	35	
8	Uccle	26	8	10	8	44	32	+12	34	
9	Wavre	26	8	6	12	41	35	+6	30	
10	Solre	26	6	9	11	32	59	−27	27	
11	Waterloo	26	7	5	14	30	49	−19	26	
12	Ganshoren	26	7	4	15	38	66	−28	25	
13	Tamines	26	5	5	16	29	51	−22	20	Qualification to relegation play-offs
14	Profondeville (R)	26	0	2	24	18	81	−63	2	Relegation to the 2017–18 Belgian Provincial Leagues

(C) Champions; (P) Promoted; (R) Relegated

== Belgian Third Amateur Division D ==
Locations of the 2016–17 Belgian Third Amateur Division D teams

=== League table ===
Pos	Team	Pld	W	D	L	GF	GA	GD	Pts	Qualification or relegation
1	Durbuy (C, P)	26	20	4	2	52	15	+37	64	Promotion to the 2017–18 Belgian Second Amateur Division
2	Tilleur	26	17	6	3	60	20	+40	57	Qualification to Promotion play-offs ACFF
3	Verlaine	26	13	6	7	40	29	+11	45	Qualification to Promotion play-offs ACFF
4	Richelle	26	12	7	7	46	36	+10	43	Qualification to Promotion play-offs ACFF
5	Mormont	26	12	5	9	49	42	+7	41	Qualification to Promotion play-offs ACFF
6	Huy	26	12	3	11	51	44	+7	39	
7	Bertrix	26	8	8	10	39	46	−7	32	
8	Cointe	26	9	4	13	38	47	−9	31	
9	Aische	26	9	3	14	35	42	−7	30	
10	Longlier	26	8	6	12	35	40	−5	30	
11	Herstal	26	7	7	12	30	36	−6	28	
12	Aywaille	26	7	7	12	30	43	−13	28	
13	Warnant (R)	26	8	3	15	34	61	−27	27	Qualification to relegation play-offs
14	Arlon (R)	26	2	7	17	32	70	−38	13	Relegation to the 2017–18 Belgian Provincial Leagues

(C) Champions; (P) Promoted; (R) Relegated

== Promotion play-offs ==
=== Promotion play-offs VFV ===
The teams finishing in second place in the Third Amateur Division A and Third Amateur Division B will take part in a promotion playoff first round together with three period winners from both divisions. These 8 teams from the VFV will play the first round of a promotion-playoff, with normally only teams promoting to the 2017–18 Belgian Second Amateur Division. Depending on the number of VFV teams relegating from the 2016–17 Belgian First Amateur Division, more teams might get promoted which was the case this season as before the play-offs it was already known that on the VFV side at least four teams would gain promotion through the play-offs, due to the fact that Coxyde vacated its place and the upcoming merger between Izegem and Ingelmunster to form Mandel United. As a result, the four winning teams in the VFV Round 1 immediately received promotion, while the other teams continued the play-offs to determine the order in which possible further places would be awarded.

In Division A, champions Ingelmunster and second placed Wetteren won the three periods, allowing the next three teams in the league to take part: Pepingen, Ronse and Dikkelvenne. In Division B, Sint-Lenaarts and Vosselaar each won one period and were assured of a place in the play-offs before the end of the season, the other places were taken by City Pirates (for finishing second overall) and Diegem (the highest finisher not already qualified).

==== VFV Round 1 ====
6 May 2017
19:30

Pepingen	2–3	Ronse

Pepingen
6 May 2017
20:00

City Pirates	3–2	Wetteren

Merksem
7 May 2017
15:00

Vosselaar	2–0	Diegem

Vosselaar
7 May 2017
15:00

Dikkelvenne	0–3	Sint-Lenaarts

Dikkelvenne

City Pirates, Ronse, Sint-Lenaarts and Vosselaar promoted to the 2017–18 Belgian Second Amateur Division. Diegem, Dikkelvenne, Pepingen and Wetteren continue into the VFV Round 2 where one extra place is available.

==== VFV Round 2 ====
11 May 2017
20:30

Dikkelvenne	2–0	Wetteren

Dikkelvenne
11 May 2017
20:30

Pepingen	2–1	Diegem

Pepingen

Dikkelvenne and Pepingen move to the VFV Round 3 to play for promotion, Diegem and Wetteren eliminated.

==== VFV Round 3 ====
14 May 2017
15:00

Pepingen	3–2	Dikkelvenne

Pepingen

Pepingen promoted to the 2017–18 Belgian Second Amateur Division, Dikkelvenne eliminated.

=== Promotion play-offs ACFF ===
The team finishing in second place in the Third Amateur Division C and Third Amateur Division D will take part in a promotion playoff first round together with three period winners from both divisions. These 8 teams from the ACFF will play the first round of a promotion-playoff, with one team promoting to the 2017–18 Belgian Second Amateur Division.

In Division C, the top three teams had each won one period. With champions RWDM47 already promoted, the other places were taken by 4th placed Albert Quevy-Mons and 5th placed Tournai. In Division D, the champions Durbuy had won two periods, the other went to Tilleur who were joined in the play-offs by the teams finishing 3rd to 5th, Verlaine, Richelle and Mormont.

==== ACFF Round 1 ====
7 May 2017
15:00

Rebecq	4–2	Albert Quevy-Mons

Rebecq
7 May 2017
15:00

Tilleur	4–5	Verlaine

Liège
7 May 2017
15:00

Mormont	3–2	Francs Borains

Mormont
7 May 2017
15:00

Richelle	1–0	Tournai

Visé

Mormont, Rebecq, Richelle and Verlaine moved on to Round 2 while Albert Quevy-Mons, Francs Borains, Tilleur and Tournai were eliminated.

==== ACFF Round 2 ====
14 May 2017
15:00

Rebecq	2–1	Mormont

Rebecq
14 May 2017
15:00

Verlaine	4–0	Richelle

Verlaine

Rebecq and Verlaine moved on to Round 3 to play for promotion. Mormont and Richelle played a match to determine third place in case extra promotion places would come up.

==== ACFF Round 3 ====
21 May 2017
15:30

Verlaine	2–2 (a.e.t.)	Rebecq
Penalties
	2–4

Verlaine

Rebecq was promoted to the 2017–18 Belgian Second Amateur Division, while Verlaine was first in line to fill up any extra vacant spot in case the amount of ACFF teams relegating in leagues above would have increased. In the end, no places freed up and Verlaine remained in the Third Amateur Division.

==== Third place match ====
21 May 2017
15:00

Mormont	2–1	Richelle

Mormont

The third place match was played to determine the order in which teams would fill any extra promotion places, if they would become available. Behind Verlaine, Mormont was ranked above Richelle due to winning the third place match. However, in the end no places freed up and both teams remained in the Third Amateur Division.

== Relegation play-offs ==
=== ACFF ===
7 May 2017
15:00

Warnant	1–4 (a.e.t.)	Tamines
Vanstechelman 68'	Report	Deketelaere 23', 111'; Jeanmart 98' (pen.); Tshiala 117'

Warnant

Warnant is relegated to the Belgian Provincial Leagues.

=== VFV ===
7 May 2017
15:00

Vlamertinge	3–0	Diest

Vlamertinge

Before the match, it was not known whether an extra VFV team would be relegated, which depended on the result of the Second Amateur Division promotion play-offs. If an ACFF team won those promotion play-offs, then an extra VFV team would be relegated. By winning the match, Vlamertinge was sure of avoiding relegation, while losing team Diest were now dependent on the result of the only ACFF team in contention for promotion, RFC Liège. On 28 May 2017, RFC Liège lost the final match of the promotion play-off, resulting in Diest being also saved and avoiding relegation to the Belgian Provincial Leagues.
