= 2017–18 Belgian First Amateur Division =

Belgian First Amateur Division
- Season: 2017–18
- Champions: Knokke
- Promoted: Lommel
- Relegated: Hamme, Berchem Sport and Patro Eisden Maasmechelen

The 2017–18 Belgian First Amateur Division was the second season of the third-tier football league in Belgium, as it was established in 2016. The fixtures were announced near the end of June 2017.

Although Knokke won the title after winning the playoffs, it was Lommel who was promoted as Knokke had not applied for a license to play at the professional level. At the bottom side of the table, following the bankruptcy of Lierse (playing in the 2017–18 Belgian First Division B), one less team was forced to be relegated. As a result, 13th placed Châtelet was saved and did not have to play the 2017–18 Belgian Second Amateur Division Promotion play-offs Final, which was played instead by Hamme who avoided direct relegation. Hamme in the end could not win the Promotion Final and was relegated after all, together with Berchem Sport and Patro Eisden Maasmechelen who had finished in the bottom two places.

== Team information ==
Locations of the 2017–18 Belgian First Amateur Division teams

=== Team changes ===
==== In ====
- Lommel United was relegated from the 2016–17 Belgian First Division B after finishing last in the relegation play-offs. In the mid-season the team changed their name back to Lommel SK.
- Knokke was promoted after winning the 2016–17 Belgian Second Amateur Division A.
- Berchem Sport was promoted after winning the 2016–17 Belgian Second Amateur Division B.
- Châtelet was promoted after winning the 2016–17 Belgian Second Amateur Division C.
- Aalst won the Second Amateur Division promotion play-offs to obtain the final promotion spot.

==== Out ====
- Beerschot Wilrijk were promoted as 2016–17 Belgian First Amateur Division winners.
- Coxyde finished in the relegation zone (14th) in the 2016–17 Belgian First Amateur Division and was therefore relegated. On top of that, the team announced it would be folding its first team for one season, only to be restarted for the 2018–19 season at the very bottom level of the Belgian football pyramid. As a result they had not applied for a Belgian remunerated football license and would have been relegated irrespective of their finishing position.
- WS Brussels finished in the relegation zone (15th) in the 2016–17 Belgian First Amateur Division and was therefore relegated. On top of that, the team was refused a Belgian remunerated football license by the Belgian FA for outstanding debts and would therefore have relegated automatically.
- Sprimont-Comblain finished in the relegation zone (16th) in the 2016–17 Belgian First Amateur Division and was therefore relegated to the 2017–18 Belgian Second Amateur Division.
- Hasselt was also relegated to the 2017–18 Belgian Second Amateur Division after finishing 13th meant they were to take part in the Second Amateur Division promotion play-offs, where the team failed to regain its place in the First Amateur Division.

== Regular season ==
=== League table ===
| Pos | Team | Pld | W | D | L | GF | GA | GD | Pts | Qualification or relegation |
|---|---|---|---|---|---|---|---|---|---|---|
| 1 | Lommel (Note: On 13 February a questionnaire revealed that only four clubs had requested a license to play in the Belgian First Division B: Deinze, Dessel, Lommel and Seraing.) | 30 | 22 | 5 | 3 | 69 | 20 | +49 | 71 | Qualification for the promotion play-offs |
| 2 | Knokke | 30 | 18 | 7 | 5 | 69 | 32 | +37 | 61 | Qualification for the promotion play-offs |
| 3 | Dessel (Note: On 13 February a questionnaire revealed that only four clubs had requested a license to play in the Belgian First Division B: Deinze, Dessel, Lommel and Seraing. Dessel eventually did not receive the license as their stadium was deemed insufficient, they are thus ineligible for promotion.) | 30 | 18 | 6 | 6 | 53 | 29 | +24 | 60 | Qualification for the promotion play-offs |
| 4 | Deinze (Note: On 13 February a questionnaire revealed that only four clubs had requested a license to play in the Belgian First Division B: Deinze, Dessel, Lommel and Seraing. Deinze eventually withdrew their application for a license and are ineligible for promotion.) | 30 | 15 | 5 | 10 | 44 | 30 | +14 | 50 | Qualification for the promotion play-offs |
| 5 | Seraing (Note: On 13 February a questionnaire revealed that only four clubs had requested a license to play in the Belgian First Division B: Deinze, Dessel, Lommel and Seraing.) | 30 | 13 | 9 | 8 | 50 | 34 | +16 | 48 | |
| 6 | Heist | 30 | 13 | 8 | 9 | 47 | 45 | +2 | 47 | |
| 7 | Oudenaarde | 30 | 13 | 6 | 11 | 50 | 36 | +14 | 45 | |
| 8 | Aalst | 30 | 13 | 5 | 12 | 48 | 46 | +2 | 44 | |
| 9 | ASV Geel | 30 | 11 | 6 | 13 | 47 | 53 | −6 | 39 | |
| 10 | Virton (Note: Virton was initially refused a license for the First Amateur Division, but received it after appeal. Virton would have been relegated irrespective of their finishing position if their appeal had been denied, as they would then be placed in last place irrespective of the number of points obtained.) | 30 | 11 | 4 | 15 | 40 | 45 | −5 | 37 | |
| 11 | Dender EH | 30 | 9 | 9 | 12 | 39 | 52 | −13 | 36 | |
| 12 | Oosterzonen | 30 | 9 | 7 | 14 | 39 | 47 | −8 | 34 | |
| 13 | Châtelet | 30 | 6 | 11 | 13 | 34 | 53 | −19 | 29 | |
| 14 | Hamme (Note: Due to the bankruptcy of Lierse in the 2017–18 Belgian First Division B, one less team needed to relegate from the Belgian First Amateur Division, as a result, 13th placed Châtelet was saved and Hamme was not automatically relegated but rather given a chance to avoid relegation through the Promotion play-offs Final.) (R) | 30 | 8 | 4 | 18 | 32 | 59 | −27 | 28 | Qualification for the Second Amateur Division Promotion play-offs Final |
| 15 | Berchem (R) | 30 | 6 | 7 | 17 | 34 | 53 | −19 | 25 | Relegation to the Second Amateur Division |
| 16 | Patro Eisden Maasmechelen (Note: Patro Eisden Maasmechelen did not request a license for the First Amateur Division and would have been relegated irrespective of its finishing position.) (R) | 30 | 3 | 5 | 22 | 18 | 79 | −61 | 14 | Relegation to the Second Amateur Division |

Source: Belgian First Division A (in Dutch), Soccerway
Rules for classification: 1) Points; 2) Matches won; 3) Goal difference; 4) Goals scored; 5) Away goals scored; 6) Away matches won.
(R) Relegated

=== Results ===
| Home \ Away | AAL | BER | CHA | DEI | DEN | DES | GEE | HAM | HEI | KNO | LOM | OOS | OUD | PAT | SER | VIR |
|---|---|---|---|---|---|---|---|---|---|---|---|---|---|---|---|---|
| Aalst | — | 1–0 | 1–2 | 0–1 | 1–3 | 1–1 | 1–0 | 3–4 | 1–1 | 1–1 | 0–3 | 3–4 | 1–0 | 2–0 | 4–2 | 2–1 |
| Berchem | 3–3 | — | 3–0 | 1–1 | 1–2 | 3–2 | 1–3 | 0–2 | 1–1 | 1–2 | 0–0 | 4–1 | 0–2 | 3–1 | 0–2 | 2–0 |
| Châtelet | 0–3 | 1–0 | — | 2–1 | 1–2 | 2–2 | 2–2 | 2–0 | 0–1 | 0–2 | 1–2 | 1–1 | 0–1 | 3–0 | 0–0 | 2–2 |
| Deinze | 1–2 | 1–1 | 2–2 | — | 1–2 | 2–0 | 2–1 | 4–0 | 2–0 | 1–0 | 0–1 | 0–1 | 4–0 | 2–0 | 2–3 | 0–3 |
| Dender EH | 1–1 | 2–0 | 1–1 | 1–0 | — | 0–1 | 2–2 | 3–1 | 4–1 | 1–3 | 0–2 | 1–2 | 2–2 | 1–1 | 1–1 | 0–2 |
| Dessel | 2–1 | 3–0 | 1–1 | 3–1 | 1–0 | — | 3–1 | 3–0 | 3–0 | 1–0 | 1–1 | 1–0 | 1–0 | 6–1 | 3–2 | 1–0 |
| ASV Geel | 0–1 | 3–0 | 4–0 | 1–3 | 3–3 | 2–0 | — | 2–1 | 1–3 | 1–3 | 3–0 | 0–0 | 2–1 | 2–1 | 1–5 | 1–1 |
| Hamme | 2–4 | 3–2 | 1–0 | 0–1 | 2–2 | 1–3 | 3–1 | — | 0–3 | 0–3 | 0–3 | 1–2 | 1–2 | 2–0 | 1–2 | 0–0 |
| Heist | 2–0 | 2–2 | 0–1 | 0–1 | 2–1 | 2–1 | 2–2 | 1–0 | — | 2–1 | 2–4 | 4–1 | 0–3 | 6–0 | 1–1 | 1–1 |
| Knokke | 1–2 | 4–2 | 6–3 | 2–2 | 5–0 | 3–2 | 4–0 | 0–0 | 3–1 | — | 1–4 | 4–1 | 4–0 | 1–1 | 3–2 | 4–0 |
| Lommel | 2–1 | 2–0 | 1–1 | 1–2 | 4–0 | 1–0 | 2–0 | 3–1 | 5–0 | 1–1 | — | 2–0 | 2–1 | 4–0 | 2–0 | 6–0 |
| Oosterzonen | 3–2 | 0–1 | 1–1 | 0–1 | 4–0 | 1–1 | 3–0 | 2–2 | 0–1 | 0–2 | 1–3 | — | 2–2 | 3–0 | 0–1 | 2–3 |
| Oudenaarde | 4–0 | 3–1 | 3–0 | 1–0 | 2–2 | 1–1 | 6–1 | 0–1 | 3–3 | 1–2 | 0–1 | 1–0 | — | 4–0 | 2–0 | 3–0 |
| Patro Eisden Maasmechelen | 0–4 | 2–1 | 3–3 | 1–2 | 2–1 | 1–3 | 0–4 | 0–2 | 1–2 | 0–0 | 1–5 | 0–3 | 1–1 | — | 1–0 | 0–2 |
| Seraing | 1–0 | 1–1 | 6–2 | 1–1 | 3–0 | 0–1 | 0–2 | 3–1 | 1–1 | 1–1 | 1–1 | 1–1 | 1–0 | 5–0 | — | 2–0 |
| Virton | 1–2 | 3–0 | 1–0 | 0–3 | 0–1 | 1–2 | 0–2 | 5–0 | 1–2 | 1–3 | 2–1 | 4–0 | 3–1 | 2–0 | 1–2 | — |

Source: Nationaal : 1st klasse (in Dutch)
Legend: Blue = home team win; Yellow = draw; Red = away team win.

== Promotion play-offs ==
The teams finishing in the top four positions entered the promotion play-offs. The points obtained during the regular season were halved (and rounded up) before the start of the playoff, as a result, Knokke started with 36 points, Lommel with 31 points, Dessel with 30 points and Deinze with 25 points. As Lommel were the only team which obtained a licence and qualified for the promotion play-offs, they were already certain of promotion even before the start of the playoffs.

| Pos | Team | Pld | W | D | L | GF | GA | GD | Pts | Qualification | KNO | LOM | DES | DEI |
|---|---|---|---|---|---|---|---|---|---|---|---|---|---|---|
| 1 | Knokke (C) | 6 | 5 | 1 | 0 | 15 | 4 | +11 | 47 | | — | 4–0 | 2–1 | 4–1 |
| 2 | Lommel (Note: Before the start of the playoffs, Lommel was already certain of promotion as the other three teams in the promotion-playoffs had either not requested or not received a license to play in the Belgian First Division B.) (P) | 6 | 3 | 1 | 2 | 9 | 7 | +2 | 46 | Promotion to the 2018–19 Belgian First Division B | 0–0 | — | 3–0 | 2–0 |
| 3 | Dessel Sport | 6 | 1 | 2 | 3 | 5 | 9 | −4 | 35 | | 1–2 | 2–1 | — | 1–1 |
| 4 | Deinze | 6 | 0 | 2 | 4 | 4 | 13 | −9 | 27 | | 1–3 | 1–3 | 0–0 | — |

Source: Belgian First Amateur Division, Soccerway
Rules for classification: 1) Points; 2) Points without (possible) half points added due to rounding; 3) Matches won; 4) Goal difference; 5) Goals scored; 6) Away goals scored; 7) Away matches won; 8) Play-off.
(C) Champions; (P) Promoted

== Number of teams by provinces ==
| Number of teams | Province | Team(s) |
|---|---|---|
| 5 | Antwerp | Berchem, Dessel, Geel, Heist and Oosterzonen Oosterwijk |
| 5 | East Flanders | Aalst, Dender EH, Deinze, Hamme and Oudenaarde |
| 2 | Limburg | Lommel and Patro Eisden Maasmechelen |
| 1 | Liège | Seraing |
| 1 | Luxembourg | Virton |
| 1 | Hainaut | Châtelet |
| 1 | West Flanders | Knokke |
