= KVV Thes Sport Tessenderlo =

Belgian football club

Thes
- Full name: Koninklijke Voetbalvereniging Tessenderlo Hulst Engsbergen Schoot Sport Tessenderlo
- Founded: 14 June 1942; 83 years ago (as Heidebloem Voetbalvereeniging Hulst)
- Ground: Gemeentelijk Sportpark, Tessenderlo
- Capacity: 3,000
- Chairman: Wendy De Wit
- Manager: Patrick Witters
- League: Belgian Division 1
- 2024–25: Belgian Division 1 VV, 6th of 16
- Website: https://www.thes-sport.be/
Home colours	Away colours

Koninklijke Voetbalvereniging Tessenderlo Hulst Engsbergen Schoot Sport Tessenderlo, more commonly known as Thes Sport or simply Thes, is a Belgian association football club founded in 1942 based in Tessenderlo, Limburg. The club colours are blue and yellow and the team currently plays in the Belgian Division 1, the third tier of Belgian football. Their home stadium is the 3,000-seat capacity Gemeentelijk Sportpark.

== History ==
The club was founded as Heidebloem Voetbalvereeniging Hulst on 14 June 1942, joining the Royal Belgian Football Association just a few months later. In 1943 the first dressing rooms were built next to the pitch in Hulst, a village encompassed by the municipality of Tessenderlo. In 1970 a new sports centre was built, which was completed in 1973. At that time the club played at the lowest levels of Belgian football, mainly in the third and fourth provincial level in Limburg, at that time corresponding to the seventh and eighth level of Belgian football.

In 1992; the club obtained royal patronage for its fiftieth year of existence, thus becoming Koninklijke Heidebloem Voetbalvereeniging Hulst (Dutch: Royal heatherflower football club Hulst). Two years later it succeeded for the first time to promote to the second provincial level, the sixth level of Belgian football and almost promoted again the following seasons, losing promotion play-offs twice. The club relegated in 1998 and started merger negotiations with two neighbouring clubs within Tessenderlo: VK Penarol Engsbergen from the village Engsbergen and Schoot Sport from the village Schoot. In preparation of the merger, the club became KVV Thes Sport Tessenderlo in 1999, with the acronym Thes standing for Tessenderlo, Hulst, Engsbergen and Schoot. The clubs in the end did not find a mutual agreement and continued to compete separately during the 1999–2000 season. Schoot Sport did not want to cooperate and would eventually cease to exist in 2002. Penarol Engsbergen did cooperate with Thes Sport in the youth leagues, but remained a separate club.

In 2001, the club moved from its accommodations in the commune of Hulst to the Gemeentelijk Sportpark closer to the centre of Tessenderlo. The terrain was available because Looi Sport, which was the original occupant, had gone defunct a few years before that in 1997. Meanwhile, Thes Sport started its rise in the ranks of Belgian football, promoting to the first provincial division in 2003 and even into the national leagues in 2005, before relegating back in 2009.

In 2015, the club again gained access to the Belgian Fourth Division, the lowest level of national football, at which time the merger with VK Penarol Engsbergen did complete and the latter ceased to exist. Following a title in the 2017–18 Belgian Second Amateur Division, the club promoted for the first time ever to the third level of Belgian football.

== First-team squad ==
As of 1 March 2026

Note: Flags indicate national team as defined under FIFA eligibility rules; some limited exceptions apply. Players may hold more than one non-FIFA nationality.

No.	Pos.	Nation	Player
2	DF	BEL	Iebe Swers
4	DF	BEL	Kobe Lemmens
5	DF	BEL	Roel Jacquemyn
6	MF	BEL	Kenneth Kerckhofs
8	MF	BEL	Tibeau Swinnen
9	FW	BEL	Fallou Fall
11	FW	BEL	Christiaan Vaes
13	DF	BEL	Nick Hulsmans
14	FW	BEL	Cédric Mateso-Liongola
15	DF	BEL	Lusandu Madimba Kaleki
17	FW	BEL	Andries Claes

No.	Pos.	Nation	Player
18	DF	BEL	Pieter Jochmans
21	FW	BEL	Ephraïm Matuasilua
22	DF	BEL	Jamil Takidine
23	MF	BEL	Toon De Wit
26	MF	BEL	Mats Van Genechten
27	GK	BEL	Milo Roekaerts
28	MF	BEL	Devin Veraghtert
30	GK	BEL	Arwen Vanhaeren
34	GK	RWA	Maxime Wenssens
48	DF	NED	Mitchel Keulen
77	MF	BEL	Lars Michiels
