= Royal Knokke FC =

Belgian football club

Knokke
- Full name: Royal Knokke Football Club
- Founded: 1905; 121 years ago
- Ground: Burgemeester Graaf Leopold Lippens Park, Knokke
- Capacity: 3,000
- Chairman: Vincent Vanhonsebrouck
- Manager: Ruud Vormer
- League: Division 1
- 2025–26: Division 1 VV, 2nd of 16
- Website: rkfc.be
Home colours	Away colours

Royal Knokke Football Club is a Belgian association football club based in Knokke, West Flanders. The club currently play in the Belgian Division 1, the third tier of Belgian football.

== History ==
The club was founded in 1905.

In 2016–17, Knokke won the Second Amateur Division winning promotion to the First Amateur Division. After another successful season, Knokke finished second in the league standing, allowing them to participate in the final play-off round for promotion. Knokke won the final round, but did not apply for a licence for second-tier Belgian First Division B, which meant that only Lommel promoted.

The following year, the club finished last in the table and relegated to the Second Amateur Division. There, they regained the league title and won promotion – albeit in a special way. Due to the COVID-19 pandemic, the Royal Belgian Football Association decided on 27 March 2020 to cancel all competitions and to determine the final rankings. Knokke had at that point played 24 games in the Second Amateur Division and finished on top with 63 points, forcing promotion back to the First Amateur Division.

Knokke made headlines when it knocked Belgian Pro League side KV Mechelen out of the 2023–24 Belgian Cup seventh round, winning 5–4 on penalties after a 1–1 draw.

In May 2026, it was announced retired Dutch midfielder Ruud Vormer would be the team's new head coach.

== Current squad ==
As of 1 March 2026

Note: Flags indicate national team as defined under FIFA eligibility rules; some limited exceptions apply. Players may hold more than one non-FIFA nationality.

No.	Pos.	Nation	Player
1	GK	BEL	Lars Knipping
2	DF	BEL	Ruben Vanraefelghem
6	MF	BEL	Luca Ferrera
7	MF	BEL	Mathias De Wolf
8	MF	BEL	Nils Pierre
9	FW	BEL	Fousseni Ouro-Sama
10	MF	BEL	Lilian Vergeylen
14	DF	BEL	Bruce Deuwel
15	DF	BEL	Lars Cooman
19	MF	BEL	Justin Pieters
20	MF	POL	Patryk Walicki (on loan from Francs Borains)
22	MF	FRA	Mohamed Boussadia (on loan from Kortrijk)

No.	Pos.	Nation	Player
23	MF	BEL	Sada Diallo
28	DF	BEL	Bryan Van Den Bogaert
34	FW	BEL	Stan Braem
42	FW	BEL	Aske Sampers
44	MF	BEL	Yari Brachet
58	DF	BEL	Leander Legein
66	GK	BEL	Wout Meese
70	GK	BEL	Indigo Lambrecht
78	DF	NED	Tresor Matanda
80	DF	BEL	Naguy Maertens
91	FW	BEL	Ike Vanleenhove
-	FW	BEL	Lennert Govaere

== Honours ==
- Champion of 2016–17 Belgian Second Amateur Division A
