= KV Woluwe-Zaventem =

Belgian football club

Woluwe-Zaventem
- Full name: Koninklijke Voetbalclub Woluwe-Zaventem
- Nickname: "De Vliegeniers" (The Aviators)
- Founded: 1941
- Ground: Gemeentelijk Stadion, Zaventem
- Capacity: 1,500
- Chairman: Edward Ceuppens
- Manager: Nico Van Nerom
- League: Belgian Third Amateur Division
- 2016–17: Belgian Second Amateur Division, 16th (relegated)
Home colours	Away colours

K.V. Woluwe-Zaventem, mostly known as Woluwe-Zaventem is a Belgian football club located in the city of Zaventem.

The club was founded in 1941 as Woluwe Sporting Club with matricule 3149. In 1993, the team merged with Wosjot Woluwe (matricule 8836, founded 1982) to form K.V. Wosjot Woluwe, with the matricule 8836 dissolving in the process. A last merger occurred in 2003, when the team merged with K.V.K. Zaventem (matricule 424, founded 1921 and dissolved in the merger) to form K.V. Woluwe-Zaventem.

== Current squad ==
Updated 19 August 2014. Note: Flags indicate national team as defined under FIFA eligibility rules; some limited exceptions apply. Players may hold more than one non-FIFA nationality.

No.	Pos.	Nation	Player
1	GK	BIH	Radenko Vujadinovic
3	DF	BEL	Romeo Debefve
5	DF	BEL	Mehdi Benloaufi
6	MF	BEL	Thomas Regnier
7	FW	BEL	Maurice Weynants
8	MF	BEL	Pieter Kempeneers
9	DF	BEL	Jente Van Ongeval
10	FW	BEL	Axel Dheur
11	MF	BEL	Walid Ben Abbes
14	FW	BEL	Joren Dehond
15	DF	BEL	Nehemie Muzembo

No.	Pos.	Nation	Player
16	DF	BEL	Achraf Essikal
17	DF	BEL	Stef Van den Heuvel
19	DF	BEL	Ugo Nwadikwa
20	FW	BEL	Anthony Lorenzon
21	MF	BEL	Denis Dessaer
22	GK	BEL	Patrick Coenen
23	DF	BEL	Seppe Geerts
24	MF	BEL	Julien Charlier
25	MF	BEL	Joachim Lyase Gengezo
