= Royal FC Mandel United =

Association football club in Izegem, Belgium

- Full name: Royal Football Club Mandel United
- Short name: RFCMU
- Founded: 1926; 100 years ago
- Ground: Skyline Arena, Izegem
- Capacity: 2,200
- Chairman: Paul Seynaeve
- Head coach: Angelo Paravizzini
- League: Belgian Division 1
- 2025–26: Belgian Division 2 VV A, 1st of 16 (promoted)
- Website: www.kfcmandelunited.be
Home colours

Royal FC Mandel United, commonly known as RFC Mandel United, formerly KFC Mandel United, is a football club based in Izegem, Belgium which is located in the Flemish Region. The club set to competing in the Belgian Division 1 from 2026–27, the third tier of Belgian football after promotion from Belgian Division 2 in 2025–26. The club was originally founded in 1926.

== History ==
=== KFC Izegem ===
KFC Izegem was founded as Football Club Izegem in 1926 and joined the Belgian Football Federation one year later. FC Izegem started in the regional divisions. At the end of the Second World War, in 1945, Izegem was promoted to the national series for the first time. From that season on, they played in the national leagues. Izegem soon performed well and finished the next seasons ranked at the top of the league every time.

In 1950, FC Izegem finally managed to win its series. For the first time in its history, the club was promoted to the Second Division. After some major league reforms, a large number of second division teams had to drop a level. In 1953, the club received the royal title.

In the sixties, after having been relegated twice, Izegem climbed back to the national divisions. The following decades, however, it went up and down between the lower national divisions and the highest provincial series.

Most of the seventies and eighties, they played in the Belgian Third Division. In the first season in the third division, Izegem finished second, barely one point behind series winner Aalst, and so missed the chance to advance to the second division.

KFC Izegem returned to the Third Division in 2012 and from then onwards, they managed to stay in that division.

=== OMS Ingelmunster ===
OMS Ingelmunster was founded in 2003 after the disappearance of the first football club in the municipality, KSV Ingelmunster. OMS Ingelmunster was already founded in 1930 and played after the Second World War as SV Olympic Ingelmunster. At that time, Molen Sport Ingelmunster also played in the municipality. Both clubs continued together from 1962 onwards as KSV Ingelmunster. This club had risen to the national series in the 1990s, even to Second Division.

After a not so successful merge with the team of Harelbeke, a new club was founded to continue the long history of Ingelmunster football. The new club was called Olympic Molen Sport Ingelmunster, a name that refers to the two former clubs of Ingelmunster, Olympic and Molen Sport. OMS Ingelmunster joined the Belgian Football Federation with matricule number 9441 and adopted the yellow and red colors of the former KSV Ingelmunster.

The club started in the very lowest provincial series but was soon able to move up in the following years. Thanks to a championship title in the Second Provincial in 2009, the club advanced to the highest provincial level that year, where it immediately made it to the final round in 2010. Ingelmunster became champions in 2012, and played in the fourth division for the first time.

=== Mandel United ===
The two clubs of KFC Izegem and OMS Ingelmunster merged in the spring of 2017 and began play in the 2017–18 season as KFC Mandel United.

KFC Mandel United finished second three times in the Belgian Second Amateur Division and ultimately was promoted in 2020–2021 to National First Division, where the team currently plays.

During the 2018–19 season, the team made an impressive run in the Belgian Cup. KFC Mandel United knocked out top-tier club Waasland-Beveren to reach the round of sixteen as one of few teams outside the first division to do so. After a strong game in Sint-Truiden, another First Division team, Mandel lost 3–2.

=== Merger ===
Formed through the merger of KFC Izegem and OMS Ingelmunster in 2017, Strive Football Group took a major share in the newly created public limited company in April 2021, changing the name of the club from KFC Mandel United to Royal FC Mandel United. The venture capital stated that the acquisition of the club "is fully part of Strive Football Group’s ambition to develop the best football talent, providing players with the best exposure opportunities worldwide".

== Stadium ==
KFC Mandel United played its home matches at OMS Ingelmunster Stadion for the 2017–18 and 2018–19 seasons.

The team then moved to Skyline Arena in Izegem beginning in the 2019–20 season. Skyline Arena has a capacity of 2,200 spectators.

Skyline Arena is used by all Royal FC Mandel United Academy teams for all training sessions and games. It has two artificial grass fields and two natural grass fields and extended hospitality options.

== Youth academy ==
Royal FC Mandel United has academy teams from U7 to U19. The team has set up a cooperation with two local fitness clubs and is working together with most of the schools of Izegem. the season 2024-2025 the U17 and U19 were champions.

Two of the club's development pillars are to develop the club into an international platform for the development of young talents and to offer young Belgian players unique international career development opportunities through the integrated Strive Football Group network, increasing the club's attractiveness for young talents.

== Crest and colours ==
Royal FC Mandel United's colors are red, black, and a hint of yellow, which are the historical colors of the club.

The logo features a crown, representing the title of "Royal", a favour bestowed on the club by the King of Belgium thanks to its 50 years of existence. The logo includes KFC Izegem's year of inception: 1926. The flag of the city of Izegem, a Dutch-speaking city in Belgium located in the Flemish Region where the club is based, is also featured in the logo. It represents the city's coat of arms since the 19th century with the cross and 12 blackbirds. The waves in the logo symbolise the Mandel River, where the city of Izegem and the club are located on its southern bank. The name of the merged club, Mandel United, refers to a tributary of the Lys, the small river Mandel.

The logo aims to mark the club's history, while giving it a new impulse, following the involvement of Strive Football Group.

The slogans of the club, 'Oes jeun', 'goestèhn' and 'goaze gevn', mean having fun, having the desire and giving everything.

== See also ==
- Category:Royal FC Mandel United players
