= 2020–21 in Belgian football =

Football in Belgium
- Season: 2020–21

Men's football
- First Division A: Club Brugge
- First Division B: Union SG
- First Amateur Division: not held
- Cup: Genk
- Super Cup: not held

The following article is a summary of the 2020–21 football season in Belgium, which is the 118th season of competitive football in the country and will run from August 2020 until June 2021.

== Men's football ==
=== League season ===
==== Promotion and relegation ====
The following teams had achieved promotion or suffered relegation going into the 2019–20 season.

League	Promoted to league	Relegated from league
First Division A	Beerschot; OH Leuven	
First Division B	Deinze; Lierse Kempenzonen; Seraing; RWD Molenbeek; Club NXT (Note: Club NXT was not promoted, but rather admitted as a youth squad into the 2020–21 Belgian First Division B, to fill the open gap left, as only 23 teams had obtained the required Belgian professional football license, while 24 teams were needed. Club NXT is ineligible for promotion as well as relegation.)	Lokeren; Roeselare; Virton
First Division Amateur Division	Francs Borains; Knokke; Mandel United; Tienen	Tubize
Second Division Amateur Division	Brakel; City Pirates; Ganshoren; Heur-Tongeren; Houtvenne; Jette; Lyra-Lierse; Ninove; Warnant; Wetteren; Zelzate	Duffel; Geel; Hamme; Namur Fosses; Onhaye; Sint-Niklaas; Tilleur; Vosselaar
Third Division Amateur Division	Anzegem; Bambrugge; Berlaar-Heikant; Binche; Crossing Schaerbeek; De Kempen; Diest; Dison; Gouvy; Koersel; Lille; Marloie; Racing Mechelen; Nijlen; Oostkamp; Rhode-De Hoek; Stockel; Tamines; Voorde-Appelterre; Wanze Bas-Oha	Bilzen; Bornem; Ciney; Helson Helchteren; Kosova Schaerbeek; Léopold Uccle; Linden; Meix-devant-Virton; Oostnieuwkerke; Spy; Walhain; Wavre; Wingene

==== Belgian First Division A ====
===== Regular season =====
Pos	Team	Pld	W	D	L	GF	GA	GD	Pts	Qualification or relegation
1	Club Brugge (C)	34	24	4	6	73	26	+47	76	Qualification for the Europa Conference League and Play-offs I (Note: The regular season winners will qualify for the 2021–22 UEFA Europa Conference League if they do not qualify for the 2021–22 UEFA Champions League in the playoffs or for the 2021–22 UEFA Europa League through the 2020–21 Belgian Cup.)
2	Antwerp	34	18	6	10	57	48	+9	60	Qualification for the Play-offs I
3	Anderlecht	34	15	13	6	51	34	+17	58	Qualification for the Play-offs I
4	Genk (Note: Genk qualifies for at least the play-off round of the Europa League through winning the 2021 Belgian Cup.)	34	16	8	10	67	48	+19	56	Qualification for the Play-offs I
5	Oostende (Note: On 14 April 2021 news was released that both Excel Mouscron and Oostende had not received a Belgian professional football license for the coming season, a requirement to play at the top two levels of Belgian football. For Oostende, a lack of financial transparency, together with generally poor quality and incompleteness of the submitted report, was given as the main reason by the committee for not awarding a license, while Excel Mouscron was refused a license as besides insufficient transparency, the committee also questioned several cash flows and whether the club was creditworthy in general, also due to the fact that the wages for the months of February and March had not yet been paid at that point. For Excel Mouscron, it was already the sixth year running the license was (initially) refused, however, the club has appealed the decision with the Belgian Court for Sports Arbitrage (BAS) successfully on each occasion and intended to do so again. Oostende was planning to launch an appeal as well, with the BAS to rule on the matter for both clubs before the 10th of May. Both clubs were allowed to add new documents to their case, but in case they however still did not receive a license after appeal, knew they would have been forced to relegate to the 2021–22 Belgian Division 2 and start the season with a 3-point penalty. Both Excel Mouscron and Oostende were however eventually awarded a license after appeal, meaning Oostende remained at the top level, while Excel Mouscron only dropped one level.)	34	15	8	11	49	41	+8	53	Qualification for the Play-offs II
6	Standard Liège	34	13	11	10	52	41	+11	50	Qualification for the Play-offs II
7	Gent	34	14	7	13	55	42	+13	49	Qualification for the Play-offs II
8	Mechelen	34	13	9	12	54	54	0	48	Qualification for the Play-offs II
9	Beerschot	34	14	5	15	58	64	−6	47	
10	Zulte Waregem	34	14	4	16	53	69	−16	46	
11	OH Leuven	34	12	9	13	54	59	−5	45	
12	Eupen	34	10	13	11	44	55	−11	43	
13	Charleroi	34	11	9	14	46	49	−3	42	
14	Kortrijk	34	11	6	17	44	57	−13	39	
15	Sint-Truiden	34	10	8	16	41	52	−11	38	
16	Cercle Brugge	34	11	3	20	40	51	−11	36	
17	Waasland-Beveren (R)	34	8	7	19	44	70	−26	31	Qualification for the Relegation play-off
18	Excel Mouscron (R)	34	7	10	17	32	54	−22	31	Relegation to First Division B

Source: Jupiler Pro League (in Dutch), Soccerway
Rules for classification: 1) Points; 2) Matches won; 3) Goal difference; 4) Goals scored; 5) Away matches won; 6) Away goal difference; 7) Away goals scored; 8) Play-off.
(C) Champions; (R) Relegated

==== Belgian First Division B ====
Pos	Team	Pld	W	D	L	GF	GA	GD	Pts	Qualification
1	Union SG (C, P)	28	22	4	2	69	24	+45	70	Promotion to the 2021–22 Belgian First Division A
2	Seraing (O, P)	28	16	4	8	54	37	+17	52	Qualification to Promotion play-off
3	Lommel	28	13	4	11	49	47	+2	43	
4	Westerlo	28	10	13	5	41	30	+11	43	
5	Deinze	28	10	9	9	45	46	−1	39	
6	RWDM47	28	10	5	13	44	48	−4	35	
7	Lierse Kempenzonen (Note: Normally, the team finishing in last place (except Club NXT which is ineligible for promotion/relegation) would have been relegated. However, the general meeting of the Pro League decided on 16 March that no team would be relegated, as the 2020–21 Belgian National Division 1 had been cancelled due to measures taken by the Belgian government against the spread of COVID-19 prohibiting amateur football, causing no team to be promoted from that league to fill the gap.)	28	4	4	20	25	54	−29	16	
8	Club NXT (Y)	28	2	7	19	23	64	−41	13	Not eligible for promotion or relegation Leave the league due to Virton's readmission.

Source: Belgian First Division B
Rules for classification: 1) Points; 2) Matches won; 3) Goal difference; 4) Goals scored; 5) Away goals scored; 6) Away matches won; 7) Play-off.
(C) Champions; (O) Play-off winners; (P) Promoted; (Y) Cannot get promoted or relegated

==== Amateur Leagues ====
All leagues from the third level and below, were cancelled in January 2021 with just a few matches played, as measures taken by the Belgian government against the spread of COVID-19 prohibited amateur football. The tables below represent the standings at the time the leagues were cancelled, however the season will be recorded as a "blank season", meaning all results are void and no teams will be promoted or relegated for sportive reasons. Clubs might however still be removed in case they do not fulfill the requirements for their level or want to restart at the bottom of the pyramid.

===== Belgian National Division 1 =====
Pos	Team	Pld	W	D	L	GF	GA	GD	Pts	Qualification or relegation
1	Tessenderlo	3	3	0	0	7	3	+4	9	
2	Tienen	4	2	0	2	5	5	0	6	
3	Heist	2	1	1	0	3	2	+1	4	
4	Sint-Eloois-Winkel	2	1	0	1	4	2	+2	3	
5	Francs Borains	1	1	0	0	2	1	+1	3	
6	Knokke	2	1	0	1	2	1	+1	3	
7	Visé (Note: Mid-April, Visé was refused a Belgian remunerated football license due to use of an incorrect employment contract as its manager José Riga was self-employed rather than signed full-time as per the requirements. Visé appealed the decision with the Belgian Court for Sports Arbitration, adjusting the contract ahead of the new deadline, but also used the appeal to apply for a Belgian professional football license, which would allow the club to play at the second level. The BAS ruled in favor of the club, meaning that in case any vacant places open up at a higher level, Visé would be eligible if manage to adhere to the more stringent requirements, such as extra capacity in the stadium and sufficient luminous intensity in the stadium.)	2	1	0	1	3	3	0	3	
8	Olympic Charleroi CF	2	1	0	1	1	1	0	3	
9	Patro Eisden Maasmechelen (Note: Patro Eisden Maasmechelen announced on 13 April 2021 that it would not be receiving a Belgian remunerated football license, a requirement to play at this level, due to outstanding debts related to social security and taxes. The club added it would appeal the decision with the Belgian Court for Sports Arbitration and believed it would be receiving a license in the end, as in the meantime the necessary funds had been obtained. Eventually the license was indeed granted.)	1	0	1	0	2	2	0	1	
10	RFC Liège	1	0	1	0	0	0	0	1	
11	Rupel Boom	2	0	1	1	0	2	−2	1	
12	Dender EH	0	0	0	0	0	0	0	0	
13	Dessel	0	0	0	0	0	0	0	0	
14	Mandel United	2	0	0	2	1	4	−3	0	
15	La Louvière Centre	2	0	0	2	1	5	−4	0	
16	Roeselare (Note: Roeselare went bankrupt before the season actually started, resulting in the team automatically finishing last. After the season neighbouring club Forza Dadizele, playing at the highest level of the Belgian Provincial Leagues, was renamed SK Roeselare-Daisel, hoping to lure in supporters from the defaulted club to help climb the club up the pyramid.)	0	0	0	0	0	0	0	0	Ceased to exist

Source: Soccerway
Rules for classification: 1) Points; 2) Matches won; 3) Goal difference; 4) Goals scored; 5) Away goals scored; 6) Away matches won.

===== Belgian Division 2 =====
====== Division VFV A ======
Pos	Team	Pld	W	D	L	GF	GA	GD	Pts
1	Ninove	4	4	0	0	9	3	+6	12
2	Gent-Zeehaven	4	2	2	0	7	5	+2	8
3	Oudenaarde	4	2	1	1	9	4	+5	7
4	Petegem	3	2	0	1	4	1	+3	6
5	Harelbeke	4	1	3	0	8	5	+3	6
6	Dikkelvenne	4	1	3	0	7	5	+2	6
7	Olsa Brakel	3	1	2	0	4	2	+2	5
8	Merelbeke	4	1	2	1	4	2	+2	5
9	Lokeren-Temse	3	1	2	0	4	3	+1	5
10	Zwevezele	3	1	1	1	2	2	0	4
11	Zelzate	3	0	3	0	5	5	0	3
12	Wetteren	4	0	2	2	3	6	−3	2
13	Ronse	4	0	2	2	4	8	−4	2
14	Menen	3	0	1	2	4	9	−5	1
15	Gullegem	4	0	1	3	1	7	−6	1
16	Westhoek	4	0	1	3	3	11	−8	1

Source: vbal4
Rules for classification: 1) Points; 2) Matches won; 3) Goal difference; 4) Goals scored; 5) Away matches won; 6) Goal difference in away matches; 7) Away goals scored.

====== Division VFV B ======
Pos	Team	Pld	W	D	L	GF	GA	GD	Pts
1	Bocholt	4	3	1	0	11	5	+6	10
2	Hoogstraten	4	2	1	1	9	4	+5	7
3	Lyra-Lierse	4	2	1	1	7	4	+3	7
4	Hasselt	3	2	1	0	6	3	+3	7
5	Diegem	4	2	1	1	8	7	+1	7
6	Londerzeel	4	2	1	1	7	9	−2	7
7	Hades	3	2	0	1	9	3	+6	6
8	Pepingen-Halle	3	2	0	1	5	3	+2	6
9	Berchem	3	1	2	0	4	3	+1	5
10	Houtvenne	4	1	1	2	4	7	−3	4
11	Cappellen	3	1	0	2	6	6	0	3
12	Spouwen-Mopertingen	3	1	0	2	5	8	−3	3
13	Heur-Tongeren	3	0	1	2	1	7	−6	1
14	Aalst	2	0	0	2	1	3	−2	0
15	City Pirates	2	0	0	2	3	7	−4	0
16	Wijgmaal	3	0	0	3	2	9	−7	0

Source: vbal4
Rules for classification: 1) Points; 2) Matches won; 3) Goal difference; 4) Goals scored; 5) Away matches won; 6) Goal difference in away matches; 7) Away goals scored.

====== Division ACFF ======
Pos	Team	Pld	W	D	L	GF	GA	GD	Pts	Qualification or relegation
1	Tubize	3	3	0	0	9	2	+7	9	
2	Ganshoren	3	2	1	0	6	4	+2	7	
3	Stockay	4	2	1	1	6	5	+1	7	
4	La Louvière	2	2	0	0	10	0	+10	6	
5	Hamoir	4	2	0	2	10	7	+3	6	
6	Givry	4	1	2	1	6	6	0	5	
7	Jette	2	1	0	1	4	2	+2	3	
8	Solières	3	1	0	2	6	6	0	3	
9	Couvin-Mariembourg	2	1	0	1	3	5	−2	3	
10	Verlaine	2	1	0	1	1	3	−2	3	
11	Waremme	3	1	0	2	5	9	−4	3	
12	Meux	3	0	3	0	4	4	0	3	
13	Rebecq	2	0	2	0	2	2	0	2	
14	Acren-Lessines	2	0	1	1	3	4	−1	1	
15	Warnant	2	0	0	2	2	6	−4	0	
16	Durbuy	3	0	0	3	2	14	−12	0	
17	Virton (Note: On 12 May 2020, Virton were refused both a professional football license and a remunerated football license, meaning they were relegated two levels, directly from the 2019–20 Belgian First Division B to the 2020–21 Belgian Division 2. The club refused to take part in the 2020–21 Belgian Division 2, forfeiting its matches and instead appealing the license decision. While initially seeming to lose the appeal, eventually the Belgian Competition Authority (BMA) ruled on 20 November 2020 that the Belgian FA had violated the competition rules in the license application of Virton. As the competitions had already progressed too far at that point, the BMA asked to reinstate Virton at the second level from the 2021–22 season, while only requiring the club to adhere to the conditions for a remunerated football license for that season, rather than the stricter rules for a professional football license, which is normally the case at this level. Among other things, this would allow the club to also employ players on amateur contracts for their initial season back at the second level. Virton has applied for a license to be allowed to play in the 2021–22 Belgian First Division B and has sued the Belgian FA for 15 million euro in damages. On 12 May 2021, the BAS agreed with the appeal of Virton, not only awarding the license to play in the 2021–22 Belgian First Division B, but also including not to be placed under extreme financial scrutiny for the 2021–22 season.)	0	0	0	0	0	0	0	0	Reinstated to the 2021–22 Belgian First Division B

Source: vbal4
Rules for classification: 1) Points; 2) Matches won; 3) Goal difference; 4) Goals scored; 5) Away matches won; 6) Goal difference in away matches; 7) Away goals scored.

==== Belgian Division 3 ====
===== Division VFV A =====
Pos	Team	Pld	W	D	L	GF	GA	GD	Pts
1	Stekene	4	3	1	0	7	2	+5	10
2	Lebbeke	4	2	2	0	9	5	+4	8
3	Overijse	3	2	1	0	7	3	+4	7
4	Oostkamp	4	2	1	1	10	8	+2	7
5	Lochristi	3	2	0	1	8	6	+2	6
6	Bambrugge	4	2	0	2	3	4	−1	6
7	Torhout	4	1	1	2	8	8	0	4
8	Hamme	3	1	1	1	4	4	0	4
9	Anzegem	4	1	1	2	3	5	−2	4
10	Wolvertem Merchtem	4	1	1	2	6	9	−3	4
11	Sint-Niklaas	2	1	0	1	3	5	−2	3
12	Voorde-Appelterre	3	0	3	0	5	5	0	3
13	Eppegem	2	0	2	0	3	3	0	2
14	Lede	3	0	2	1	1	2	−1	2
15	Rhodienne-De Hoek	3	0	1	2	4	6	−2	1
16	Melsele	4	0	1	3	4	10	−6	1

Source: vbal4
Rules for classification: 1) Points; 2) Matches won; 3) Goal difference; 4) Goals scored; 5) Away matches won; 6) Goal difference in away matches; 7) Away goals scored.

===== Division VFV B =====
Pos	Team	Pld	W	D	L	GF	GA	GD	Pts
1	Betekom	4	3	0	1	11	6	+5	9
2	Nijlen	4	3	0	1	9	7	+2	9
3	Berlaar-Heikant	4	2	2	0	9	6	+3	8
4	Lille	4	2	1	1	13	7	+6	7
5	Termien	4	2	1	1	11	8	+3	7
6	Esperanza Pelt	3	2	0	1	8	4	+4	6
7	Witgoor	4	2	0	2	7	6	+1	6
8	Sint-Lenaarts	4	2	0	2	8	9	−1	6
9	Racing Mechelen	4	2	0	2	5	9	−4	6
10	Diest	4	1	1	2	6	7	−1	4
11	Zwarte Leeuw	3	1	1	1	5	6	−1	4
12	Turnhout	3	1	0	2	3	7	−4	3
13	Wellen	4	0	3	1	5	6	−1	3
14	De Kempen	4	0	2	2	4	6	−2	2
15	Beringen	4	0	2	2	4	8	−4	2
16	Koersel	3	0	1	2	4	10	−6	1

Source: vbal4
Rules for classification: 1) Points; 2) Matches won; 3) Goal difference; 4) Goals scored; 5) Away matches won; 6) Goal difference in away matches; 7) Away goals scored.

===== Division ACFF A =====
Pos	Team	Pld	W	D	L	GF	GA	GD	Pts	Qualification or relegation
1	Tamines	4	4	0	0	12	4	+8	12	
2	Crossing Schaerbeek	4	3	1	0	11	4	+7	10	
3	Namur FLV	4	3	1	0	8	1	+7	10	
4	Binche	4	2	1	1	8	7	+1	7	
5	CS Braine	4	2	1	1	4	3	+1	7	
6	Manageoise	2	2	0	0	4	0	+4	6	
7	Aische	3	2	0	1	4	3	+1	6	
8	Stade Brainois (Note: On 3 April 2020, Stade Braine announced it would merge with neighboring Tubize to form Royale Union Tubize-Braine, which will start playing at the current level of Tubize, the Belgian Division 2. As such, the place of Stade Braine in the Belgian Division 3 will be vacated.)	4	1	1	2	5	5	0	4	Merged into Tubize
9	Stockel	4	1	1	2	9	10	−1	4	
10	Symphorinois	4	1	1	2	5	6	−1	4	
11	Ostiches-Ath	3	1	0	2	2	4	−2	3	
12	Mons	4	1	0	3	5	12	−7	3	
13	Tournai	3	0	1	2	2	4	−2	1	
14	Saint-Ghislain	3	0	1	2	2	7	−5	1	
15	Gosselies	4	0	1	3	5	11	−6	1	
16	Pont-à-Celles-Buzet	2	0	0	2	1	6	−5	0	

Source: vbal4
Rules for classification: 1) Points; 2) Matches won; 3) Goal difference; 4) Goals scored; 5) Away matches won; 6) Goal difference in away matches; 7) Away goals scored.

===== Division ACFF B =====
Pos	Team	Pld	W	D	L	GF	GA	GD	Pts
1	Dison	3	2	1	0	7	2	+5	7
2	Mormont	3	2	1	0	6	2	+4	7
3	Richelle	2	2	0	0	6	2	+4	6
4	Habay	3	2	0	1	7	7	0	6
5	Herstal	3	2	0	1	5	5	0	6
6	Jodoigne	4	2	0	2	8	9	−1	6
7	Raeren-Eynatten	3	1	1	1	6	5	+1	4
8	Onhaye	3	1	0	2	7	5	+2	3
9	Rochefort	2	1	0	1	4	5	−1	3
10	Aywaille	2	1	0	1	3	4	−1	3
11	Huy	3	1	0	2	5	8	−3	3
12	Oppagne-Wéris	2	0	1	1	1	2	−1	1
13	Gouvy	2	0	1	1	3	5	−2	1
14	Sprimont	2	0	1	1	1	3	−2	1
15	Wanze Bas-Oha	1	0	0	1	0	2	−2	0
16	Marloie	2	0	0	2	4	7	−3	0

Source: vbal4
Rules for classification: 1) Points; 2) Matches won; 3) Goal difference; 4) Goals scored; 5) Away matches won; 6) Goal difference in away matches; 7) Away goals scored.

=== Cup competitions ===
Competition	Winner	Score	Runner-up
2020–21 Belgian Cup	Genk	2–1	Standard Liège
2020 Belgian Super Cup	not held (Club Brugge vs. Antwerp)		

== UEFA competitions ==
Champions Club Brugge qualified directly for the group stage of the Champions League, while runners-up Gent started in the qualifying rounds. Cup winners Antwerp started in the group stage of the Europa League, while Charleroi and Standard Liège started in the UEFA Europa League qualifying rounds after respectively finishing third and fifth.

Date	Team	Competition	Round	Leg	Opponent	Location	Score	Belgian Team Goalscorers
15 September 2020	Gent	Champions League	Qual. Round 3	Single Leg, Home	(Austria) Rapid Wien	Ghelamco Arena, Ghent	2–1	Dorsch, Yaremchuk (p)
17 September 2020	Standard Liège	Europa League	Qual. Round 2	Single Leg, Home	(Wales) Bala Town	Stade Maurice Dufrasne, Liège	2–0	Avenatti (p), Amallah
23 September 2020	Gent	Champions League	Play-off round	Leg 1, Home	(Ukraine) Dynamo Kyiv	Ghelamco Arena, Ghent	1–2	Kleindienst
24 September 2020	Charleroi	Europa League	Qual. Round 3	Single Leg, Home	(Serbia) Partizan	Stade du Pays de Charleroi, Charleroi	2–1 (a.e.t.)	Dessoleil, Rezaei
24 September 2020	Standard Liège	Europa League	Qual. Round 3	Single Leg, Home	(Serbia) Vojvodina	Stade Maurice Dufrasne, Liège	2–1 (a.e.t.)	Avenatti (p), Amallah
29 September 2020	Gent	Champions League	Play-off round	Leg 2, Away	(Ukraine) Dynamo Kyiv	NSC Olimpiyskiy, Kyiv	3–0	
24 September 2020	Charleroi	Europa League	Qual. Round 3	Single Leg, Home	(Poland) Lech Poznań	Stade du Pays de Charleroi, Charleroi	1–2	Fall
1 October 2020	Standard Liège	Europa League	Play-off round	Single Leg, Home	(Hungary) Fehérvár	Stade Maurice Dufrasne, Liège	3–1	Gavory, Amallah (2x (p))
20 October 2020	Club Brugge	Champions League	Group Stage	Matchday 1, Away	(Russia) Zenit Saint Petersburg	Krestovsky Stadium, Saint Petersburg	1–2	Dennis, De Ketelaere
22 October 2020	Antwerp	Europa League	Group Stage	Matchday 1, Away	(Bulgaria) Ludogorets Razgrad	Huvepharma Arena, Razgrad	1–2	Gerkens, Refaelov
22 October 2020	Gent	Europa League	Group Stage	Matchday 1, Away	(Czech Republic) Slovan Liberec	Stadion u Nisy, Liberec	1–0	
22 October 2020	Standard Liège	Europa League	Group Stage	Matchday 1, Home	(Scotland) Rangers	Stade Maurice Dufrasne, Liège	0–2	
28 October 2020	Club Brugge	Champions League	Group Stage	Matchday 2, Home	(Italy) Lazio	Jan Breydel Stadium, Bruges	1–1	Vanaken (p)
29 October 2020	Antwerp	Europa League	Group Stage	Matchday 2, Home	(England) Tottenham Hotspur	Bosuilstadion, Antwerp	1–0	Refaelov
29 October 2020	Gent	Europa League	Group Stage	Matchday 2, Home	(Germany) 1899 Hoffenheim	Ghelamco Arena, Ghent	1–4	Kleindienst
29 October 2020	Standard Liège	Europa League	Group Stage	Matchday 2, Away	(Portugal) Benfica	Estádio da Luz, Lisbon	3–0	
4 November 2020	Club Brugge	Champions League	Group Stage	Matchday 3, Home	(Germany) Borussia Dortmund	Jan Breydel Stadium, Bruges	0–3	
5 November 2020	Antwerp	Europa League	Group Stage	Matchday 3, Home	(Austria) LASK	Bosuilstadion, Antwerp	0–1	
5 November 2020	Gent	Europa League	Group Stage	Matchday 3, Away	(Serbia) Red Star Belgrade	Red Star Stadium, Belgrade	2–1	Odjidja-Ofoe
5 November 2020	Standard Liège	Europa League	Group Stage	Matchday 3, Away	(Poland) Lech Poznań	Stadion Miejski, Poznań	3–1	Lestienne
24 November 2020	Club Brugge	Champions League	Group Stage	Matchday 4, Away	(Germany) Borussia Dortmund	Westfalenstadion, Dortmund	3–0	
26 November 2020	Antwerp	Europa League	Group Stage	Matchday 4, Away	(Austria) LASK	Linzer Stadion, Linz	0–2	Refaelov, Gerkens
26 November 2020	Gent	Europa League	Group Stage	Matchday 4, Home	(Serbia) Red Star Belgrade	Ghelamco Arena, Ghent	0–2	
26 November 2020	Standard Liège	Europa League	Group Stage	Matchday 4, Home	(Poland) Lech Poznań	Stade Maurice Dufrasne, Liège	2–1	Tapsoba, Laifis
2 December 2020	Club Brugge	Champions League	Group Stage	Matchday 5, Home	(Russia) Zenit Saint Petersburg	Jan Breydel Stadium, Bruges	3–0	De Ketelaere, Vanaken (p), Lang
3 December 2020	Antwerp	Europa League	Group Stage	Matchday 5, Home	(Bulgaria) Ludogorets Razgrad	Bosuilstadion, Antwerp	3–1	Hongla, De Laet, Benson
3 December 2020	Gent	Europa League	Group Stage	Matchday 5, Home	(Czech Republic) Slovan Liberec	Ghelamco Arena, Ghent	1–2	Yaremchuk
3 December 2020	Standard Liège	Europa League	Group Stage	Matchday 5, Away	(Scotland) Rangers	Ibrox Stadium, Glasgow	3–2	Lestienne, Čop
8 December 2020	Club Brugge	Champions League	Group Stage	Matchday 6, Away	(Italy) Lazio	Stadio Olimpico, Rome	2–2	Vormer, Vanaken
10 December 2020	Antwerp	Europa League	Group Stage	Matchday 6, Away	(England) Tottenham Hotspur	Tottenham Hotspur Stadium, London	0–2	
10 December 2020	Gent	Europa League	Group Stage	Matchday 6, Away	(Germany) 1899 Hoffenheim	Rhein-Neckar-Arena, Sinsheim	1–4	Fortuna
10 December 2020	Standard Liège	Europa League	Group Stage	Matchday 6, Home	(Portugal) Benfica	Stade Maurice Dufrasne, Liège	2–2	Raskin, Tapsoba
18 February 2021	Antwerp	Europa League	Round of 32	Leg 1, Home	(Scotland) Rangers	Bosuilstadion, Antwerp	3–4	Avenatti, Refaelov (p), Hongla
18 February 2021	Club Brugge	Europa League	Round of 32	Leg 1, Away	(Ukraine) Dynamo Kyiv	NSC Olimpiyskiy Stadium, Kyiv	1–1	Mechele
25 February 2021	Antwerp	Europa League	Round of 32	Leg 2, Away	(Scotland) Rangers	Ibrox Stadium, Glasgow	5–2	Refaelov, Lamkel Zé
25 February 2021	Club Brugge	Europa League	Round of 32	Leg 2, Home	(Ukraine) Dynamo Kyiv	Jan Breydel Stadium, Bruges	0–1	

1. LASK play their home matches at Linzer Stadion, Linz, instead of their regular home stadium Waldstadion, Pasching.

=== European qualification for 2021–22 summary ===
Competition	Qualifiers	Reason for Qualification
UEFA Champions League Group Stage	Club Brugge	1st in Belgian First Division A
UEFA Champions League Third Qualifying Round	Genk	2nd in Belgian First Division A
UEFA Europa League Play-off round	Antwerp	3rd in Belgian First Division A
UEFA Europa Conference League Third Qualifying Round	Anderlecht	4th in Belgian First Division A
UEFA Europa Conference League Second Qualifying Round	Gent	Play-off II winner

== Managerial changes ==
This is a list of changes of managers within Belgian professional league football:

=== First Division A ===
Team	Outgoing manager	Manner of departure	Date of vacancy	Position	Replaced by	Date of appointment
Cercle Brugge	(Germany) Bernd Storck	End of contract	End of 2019–20 season	Pre-season	(England) Paul Clement	3 July 2020
Antwerp	(Romania) László Bölöni	End of contract	End of 2019–20 season	Pre-season	(Croatia) Ivan Leko	20 May 2020
Sint-Truiden	(Slovenia) Miloš Kostić	Mutual consent	End of 2019–20 season	Pre-season	(Australia) Kevin Muscat	2 June 2020
Waasland-Beveren	(Belgium) Dirk Geeraerd (caretaker)	Caretaker replaced	End of 2019–20 season	Pre-season	(Belgium) Nicky Hayen	4 June 2020
Oostende	(Bosnia and Herzegovina) Adnan Čustović	Replaced	End of 2019–20 season	Pre-season	(Germany) Alexander Blessin	7 June 2020
Standard Liège	(Belgium) Michel Preud'homme	Resigned	End of 2019–20 season	Pre-season	(France) Philippe Montanier	10 June 2020
Excel Mouscron	(Germany) Bernd Hollerbach	Mutual consent	End of 2019–20 season	Pre-season	(France) Fernando Da Cruz	18 July 2020
Anderlecht	(Belgium) Franky Vercauteren	Kompany became sole manager	17 August 2020	3rd	(Belgium) Vincent Kompany	17 August 2020
Gent	(Denmark) Jess Thorup	Sacked	20 August 2020	16th	(Romania) László Bölöni	20 August 2020
Gent	(Romania) László Bölöni	Sacked	14 September 2020	16th	(Belgium) Wim De Decker	14 September 2020
Genk	(Germany) Hannes Wolf	Sacked	15 September 2020	14th	(Belgium) Domenico Olivieri (caretaker)	15 September 2020
Genk	(Belgium) Domenico Olivieri	Caretaker replaced	24 September 2020	14th	(Denmark) Jess Thorup	24 September 2020
Excel Mouscron	(France) Fernando Da Cruz	Sacked	19 October 2020	18th	(Portugal) Jorge Simão	20 October 2020
Genk	(Denmark) Jess Thorup	Hired by (Denmark) Copenhagen	2 November 2020	7th	(Netherlands) John van den Brom	8 November 2020 (Note: While van den Brom was announced on 6 November 2020, caretaker Domenico Olivieri was still leading the group during the match of 7 November 2020 against Sint-Truiden, with van den Brom only officially taking charge of 8 November 2020.)
Sint-Truiden	(Australia) Kevin Muscat	Sacked	1 December 2020	16th	(Belgium) Stef Van Winckel (caretaker)	1 December 2020
Gent	(Belgium) Wim De Decker	Sacked	3 December 2020	12th	(Belgium) Hein Vanhaezebrouck	4 December 2020
Sint-Truiden	(Belgium) Stef Van Winckel	Caretaker replaced	7 December 2020	17th	(Belgium) Peter Maes	7 December 2020
Standard Liège	(France) Philippe Montanier	Sacked	26 December 2020	11th	(Senegal) Mbaye Leye	30 December 2020
Antwerp	(Croatia) Ivan Leko	Hired by (China) Shanghai SIPG	29 December 2020	5th	(Belgium) Franky Vercauteren	4 January 2021
Beerschot	(Argentina) Hernán Losada	Hired by (United States) D.C. United	17 January 2021	10th	(Belgium) Will Still	19 January 2021
Kortrijk	(Belgium) Yves Vanderhaeghe	Sacked	31 January 2021	15th	(Slovenia) Luka Elsner	31 January 2021
Cercle Brugge	(England) Paul Clement	Sacked	1 February 2021	17th	(Belgium) Yves Vanderhaeghe	3 February 2021

=== First Division B ===
Team	Outgoing manager	Manner of departure	Date of vacancy	Position	Replaced by	Date of appointment
Union SG	(Spain) Thomas Christiansen	Contract not prolonged	End of 2019–20 season	Pre-season	(Belgium) Felice Mazzù	24 May 2020
Lommel	(Belgium) Peter Maes	Contract not prolonged	End of 2019–20 season	Pre-season	(England) Liam Manning	10 July 2020
RWD Molenbeek	(Belgium) Frédéric Stilmant (caretaker)	Caretaker replaced	End of 2019–20 season	Pre-season	(Belgium) Laurent Demol	11 June 2020
RWD Molenbeek	(Belgium) Laurent Demol	Sacked	2 December 2020	6th	(Belgium) Frédéric Stilmant (caretaker)	2 December 2020
RWD Molenbeek	(Belgium) Frédéric Stilmant (caretaker)	Caretaker replaced	7 December 2020	6th	(Belgium) Vincent Euvrard	7 December 2020
Deinze	(Belgium) David Gevaert	Sacked	4 March 2021	6th	(Belgium) Cédric Vlaeminck (caretaker) (Note: Wim De Decker was appointed the new manager of Deinze, but would only be observing and analysing the players for the remainder of the season. Assistant-manager Cédric Vlaeminck will take up the role of manager until the end of the season, leading the training sessions and being on the sideline during matches.)	4 March 2021

== See also ==
- 2020–21 Belgian First Division A
- 2020–21 Belgian First Division B
- 2020–21 Belgian National Division 1
- 2020–21 Belgian Division 2
- 2020–21 Belgian Division 3
- 2020–21 Belgian Cup
- 2020 Belgian Super Cup
