= 2020–21 Belgian Cup =

Tournament details
- Country: Belgium
- Dates: 2 August 2020 – 25 April 2021

Final positions
- Champions: Genk
- Runners-up: Standard Liège

The 2020–21 Belgian Cup, called the Croky Cup for sponsorship reasons, was the 66th season of Belgium's annual football cup competition. The competition began on 2 August 2020 and ended with the final on 25 April 2021. The winners of the competition qualified for the 2021–22 UEFA Europa League play-off round.

== Competition format ==
The competition consisted of one preliminary round, followed by ten proper rounds. All rounds were single-match elimination rounds, including the semi-finals which were traditionally held over two legs but not this season due to an extremely tight schedule. When tied after 90 minutes in the first three rounds, penalties were taken immediately. From round four, when tied after 90 minutes first an extra time period of 30 minutes was played, then penalties were taken if still necessary.

Teams entered the competition in different rounds, based upon their 2020–21 league affiliation. Teams from the fifth-level Belgian Division 3 or lower began in round 1, with the exception of four teams from the Luxembourg Belgian Provincial League which started in the preliminary round. Belgian Division 2 teams entered in round 2, Belgian National Division 1 teams entered in round 3, Belgian First Division B teams in round 5 and finally the Belgian First Division A teams entered in round 6.

Round	Clubs remaining	Clubs involved	Winners from previous round	New entries this round	Leagues entering at this round	Exceptions entering at this round
Preliminary Round	312	4	none	4		4 Luxembourg Belgian Provincial League teams
Round 1	310	221	2	219	Belgian Division 3 (63 teams) and Belgian Provincial Leagues (156 teams)	Wetteren
Round 2	200	160	110 + 1 bye	49	Belgian Division 2	Mandel United
Round 3	120	96	80	16	Belgian National Division 1	Lierse Kempenzonen
Round 4	72	48	48	none	none	
Round 5	48	32	24	8	Belgian First Division B (except Club NXT)	Waasland-Beveren & OH Leuven
Round 6	32	32	16	16	Belgian First Division A	
Round 7	16	16	16	none	none	
Quarter-Finals	8	8	8	none	none	
Semi-Finals	4	4	4	none	none	
Final	2	2	2	none	none	

== Round and draw dates ==
Round	Draw date	Match date
Preliminary Round	14 July 2020	23 August 2020
First Round	14 July 2020	29 & 30 August 2020
Second Round	14 July 2020	5 & 6 September 2020
Third Round	14 July 2020	11 - 15 September 2020
Fourth Round	14 July 2020	20 September 2020
Fifth Round	21 September 2020	11 October 2020
Sixth Round	12 October 2020	2 & 3 February 2021
Seventh Round	8 January 2021	9 - 11 February 2021
Quarter-finals	11 February 2021	2 - 4 March 2021
Semi-finals	4 March 2021	13 & 14 March 2021
Final		25 April 2021

== Preliminary round ==
This round of matches was played on 23 August 2020 and included four teams playing in the Luxembourg Belgian Provincial League.

Tie	Home team (tier)	Score	Away team (tier)
1	Arlon (6)	6 - 0	Melreux-Hotton (7)
2	Freylange (6)	1 - 2	St-Hubert (6)

== First round ==
This round of matches was played on 29 and 30 August 2020 and includes teams playing in the Belgian Division 3 and Belgian Provincial Leagues. Teams were divided into eight geographical groups and teams from the Belgian Division 3 were seeded and could not play each other. Note: Wetteren was promoted into the Belgian Division 2 after the draw was made to fill up a vacant spot but no redraw was made.

Tie	Home team (tier)	Score	Away team (tier)
Group 1
3	Diksmuide (6)	1 - 0	Oostnieuwkerke (6)
4	Torhout (5)	2 - 3	RC Lauwe (6)
5	Rumbeke (6)	3 - 0	Jong Zulte (6)
6	Wevelgem City (7)	1 - 8	Eendracht Wervik (6)
7	Sassport Boezinge (6)	2 - 2 (4–3 p)	Dadizele (6)
8	Lauwe (6)	1 - 3	Latem (6)
9	Anzegem (5)	0 - 1	Eeklo Meetjesland (7)
10	Zedelgem (6)	1 - 1 (5–6 p)	Wielsbeke (6)
11	Racing Waregem (6)	2 - 1	Proven (8)
12	Adegem (7)	2 - 2 (3–5 p)	Mariakerke (6)
13	Munkzwalm (6)	2 - 1	Aalter (6)
14	Voorwaarts Zwevezele B (7)	2 - 2 (4–5 p)	St-Denijs Sport (7)
15	Oostkamp (5)	5 - 1	Houthulst (7)
16	Oostduinkerke (6)	0 - 4	Blankenberge (6)
Group 2
17	RFC Wetteren (4)	3 - 0	Wemmel (7)
18	Svelta Melsele (5)	2 - 1	Rapid Leest (6)
19	Hamme (5)	7 - 0	Schelle (7)
20	Willebroek (7)	2 - 2 (3–2 p)	Grimbergen (6)
21	Wolvertem Merchtem (5)	2 - 0	Wambeek (6)
22	Groot Dilbeek (7)	1 - 1 (4–3 p)	St-Jozef Londerzeel (8)
23	Haasdonk (7)	2 - 0	Eendracht Zele (6)
24	Eppegem (5)	7 - 0	Rupelmonde (8)
25	Lebbeke (5)	2 - 0	Bornem (6)
26	Lochristi (5)	5 - 0	Dendermonde (6)
27	Berlare (6)	0 - 0 (4–2 p)	Sint-Niklaas (5)
28	Racing Mechelen (5)	3 - 1	HO Kalken (6)
29	Schelde Serskamp (8)	0 - 0 (6–5 p)	Avanti Stekene (5)
30	Jong Lede (5)	2 - 0	Kruibeke (7)
Group 3
31	AFC Evere (6)	0 - 3	Hoboken (7)
32	Berlaar-Heikant (5)	2 - 4	Stockel (6)
33	Herent (6)	6 - 1	Broechem (7)
34	Sporting Bruxelles (6)	1 - 1 (6–7 p)	St-Jozef Rijkevorsel (8)
35	Kosova Schaerbeek (6)	1 - 0	Ixelles (6)
36	Stade Everois (6)	2 - 3	Berchem Sport B (8)
37	Sint-Job (7)	2 - 1	Betekom (5)
38	Standaard Meerbeek (8)	0 - 5	Saint-Josse (6)
39	Stade Bierbeek (6)	0 - 3	Zwarte Leeuw (5)
40	Linden (6)	2 - 1	Excelsior Mariaburg (8)
41	BX Brussels (6)	0 - 5	Bertem-Leefdaal (6)
42	Kontich (6)	3 - 2	Léopold (6)
43	Ranst (6)	3 - 2	St-Lenaarts (5)
44	Crossing Schaerbeek (5)	4 - 1	FC Schaerbeek (6)
Group 4
45	Punt-Larum (8)	2 - 2 (8–9 p)	St-Dymphna (7)
46	Witgoor Sport (5)	3 - 0	Kadijk Overpelt (8)
47	Diest (5)	1 - 2	Berg en Dal (6)
48	Achel (6)	4 - 2	Verbroedering Lommel (8)
49	Esperanza Pelt (5)	1 - 1 (5–3 p)	SK Meldert (8)
50	Crossing Vissenaken (8)	0 - 1	De Kempen (5)
51	Lille (5)	2 - 0	Helson Helchteren (6)
52	Herk (6)	5 - 2	Herselt (7)
53	Vorselaar (6)	4 - 0	Oud-Turnhout (9)
54	Jodoigne (5)	2 - 2 (2–0 p)	Juve Hasselt (6)
55	Beringen (5)	2 - 0	Noordstar Noorderwijk (8)
56	Glabbeek-Zuurbemde (8)	0 - 3	Hoegaarden-Outgaarden (6)
57	Weerstand Koersel (5)	0 - 1	Wezel (6)
58	Waanrode (8)	0 - 11	KFC Turnhout (5)

Tie	Home team (tier)	Score	Away team (tier)
Group 5
59	Alken (6)	0 - 1	Torpedo Hasselt (6)
60	Raeren-Eynatten (5)	4 - 2	Trois Frontières (7)
61	Groen Star Beek (6)	8 - 1	Sart-Tilman (8)
62	Vliermaal (8)	0 - 4	FC Tilleur (8)
63	Richelle United (5)	3 - 1	Calcio Genk (8)
64	Rechain (6)	1 - 2	Hombourg (7)
65	Herstal (5)	1 - 6	Schoonbeek-Beverst (6)
66	Wellen (5)	1 - 0	Espoir Minerois (7)
67	Stade Disonais (5)	10 - 2	Aubel B (7)
68	Aubel (6)	0 - 1	Bilzerse Waltwilder (6)
69	Entente Blegnytoise B (9)	2 - 5	Herderen-Millen (6)
70	Opitter (8)	1 - 4	JS Fizoise (6)
71	Elsautoise (6)	1 - 1 (3–5 p)	Vaux-Chaudfontaine (7)
72	Standard Elen (7)	0 - 4	Eendracht Termien (5)
Group 6
73	Vaux-Noville (6)	1 - 1 (3–4 p)	Sprimont B (6)
74	St-Hubert (6)	0 - 2	Sprimont (5)
75	Huy (5)	0 - 2	Ster-Francorchamps B (9)
76	La Roche (6)	0 - 2	Messancy (7)
77	Wanze/Bas-Oha (5)	3 - 4	Chevetogne (6)
78	Tenneville Sports (7)	1 - 3	Huccorgne (7)
79	Meix-Devant-Virton B (7)	0 - 4	Aywaille (5)
80	Andennais (6)	1 - 2	Marloie Sports (5)
81	Arlon (6)	0 - 1	Habay-la-Neuve (5)
82	Rochefort (5)	11 - 0	St-Louis-St-Leger (7)
83	Oppagne-Wéris (5)	4 - 1	Bastogne (6)
84	Spa (8)	0 - 2	Mormont (5)
85	Gouvy (5)	2 - 2 (4–2 p)	FC Bercheux (7)
Group 7
86	Montignies (6)	9 - 1	Forchies (8)
87	Rhisnes (7)	0 - 0 (3–5 p)	Malonne (6)
88	Braine (5)	3 - 0	Bossière (7)
89	Hoeilaart (7)	1 - 2	Aische (5)
90	Rhodienne-De-Hoek (5)	10 - 1	Walcourt (8)
91	Arquet (7)	5 - 0	Walhain (5)
92	Onhaye (5)	3 - 0	Fernelmont-Hemptinne (6)
93	Sart-Bernard (7)	2 - 2 (3–4 p)	Tempo Overijse (5)
94	Nismes (6)	1 - 1 (8–7 p)	Union Lasne-Ohain (6)
95	Jeunesse Tamines (5)	2 - 1	Genappe (6)
96	RAS Monceau (6)	1 - 3	Union Namur (5)
97	Gembloux (7)	2 - 3	Gosselies Sports (5)
98		bye	Pont-a-Celles Buzet (5)
99	Binche (5)	4 - 1	Ransart (6)
Group 8
100	Tollembeek (8)	0 - 2	Tournai (5)
101	Galmaarden (7)	0 - 3	Rapid Symphorinois (5)
102	Renaissance Mons (5)	3 - 0	Mesvin (7)
103	Vacresse (7)	0 - 1	Ardennen (6)
104	Stade Brainois (5)	3 - 0	Naastois (7)
105	Hornu (6)	0 - 3	Templeuve (7)
106	Gerpinnes (7)	0 - 6	Entité Manageoise (5)
107	Nivellois (6)	1 - 3	Denderhoutem (6)
108	Excelsior Biévène (6)	0 -3	SG-Tertre-Hautrage (5)
109	Belœil (6)	5 - 0	Mons Nord (7)
110	Elene-Grotenberge (6)	5 - 1	Houdinois (6)
111	Bambrugge (5)	5 - 1	Luingnois (6)
112	Ostiches (5)	2 - 2 (5–4 p)	Olympic Burst (7)
113	Voorde Appelterre (5)	1 - 1 (9–8 p)	Meslin Grand-Marais (7)

== Second round ==
This round of matches was played on 5 and 6 September 2020 and includes the 111 winners from the First Round together with 49 teams playing in the Belgian Division 2. Teams from the Belgian Division 2 were seeded and could not play each other. Note: Mandel United was promoted into the Belgian National Division 1 after the draw was made to fill up a vacant spot but no redraw was made.

Tie	Home team (tier)	Score	Away team (tier)
114	Mandel United (3)	3–1	Binche (5)
115	Stockel (6)	0–0 (4–5 p)	Raeren-Eynatten (5)
116	Latem (6)	0–0 (4–5 p)	Lochristi (5)
117	Durbuy (4)	3–0	Malonne (6)
118	City Pirates (4)	1–1 (5–4 p)	FC Lebbeke (5)
119	Stockay (4)	3–0	Aywaille (5)
120	Waremme (4)	2–1	Gouvy (5)
121	Virton (4)	FF 0–5	Bambrugge (5)
122	Bertem-Leefdaal (6)	3–1	Tubize (4)
123	Rochefort (5)	4–2	Mormont (5)
124	Harelbeke (4)	3–0	Elene-Grotenberge (6)
125	St-Jozef Rijkevorsel (8)	1–4	Sprimont (5)
126	Hades (4)	2–0	Tempo Overijse (5)
127	Petegem (4)	5–0	Willebroekse (7)
128	Westhoek (4)	2–0	Denderhoutem (6)
129	Oostkamp (5)	3–5	Aalst (4)
130	Wijgmaal (4)	2–0	JS Fizoise (6)
131	Munkzwalm (6)	2–0	Templeuve (7)
132	Houtvenne (4)	1–1 (6–5 p)	Sassport Boezinge (6)
133	FC Tilleur (8)	2–2 (14–13 p)	Racing Waregem (6)
134	Hasselt (4)	1–1 (5–4 p)	Eendracht Wervik (6)
135	RC Gent (4)	3–1	Saint-Josse (6)
136	Crossing Schaerbeek (5)	3–0	Richelle United (5)
137	Diksmuide (6)	0–1	SG-Tertre-Hautrage (5)
138	Jong Lede (5)	2–1	Eppegem (5)
139	Eendracht Termien (5)	3–3 (3–4 p)	Jette (4)
140	Bocholt (4)	0–2	Oppagne-Wéris (5)
141	Hombourg (7)	3–2	Sint-Job (7)
142	Schoonbeek-Beverst (6)	5–0	Excelsior Mariakerke (6)
143	Hoogstraten (4)	4–1	Ranst (6)
144	Warnant (4)	1–1 (5–4 p)	Habaye-la-Neuve (5)
145	Rebecq (4)	4–1	Arquet (7)
146	Rhodienne-De-Hoek (5)	0–5	Zelzate (4)
147	Diegem (4)	1–0	Herderen-Millen (6)
148	Marloie Sport (5)	3–0	Stade Disonais (5)
149	Belœil (6)	0–1	Ronse (4)
150	Aische (5)	3–5	Couvin-Mariembourg (4)
151	Esperanza Pelt (5)	2–2 (5–3 p)	Stade Brainois (5)
152	Herent (6)	4–0	Svelta Melsele (5)
153	Groen Star Beek (6)	1–0	Huccorgne (7)

Tie	Home team (tier)	Score	Away team (tier)
154	St-Dymphna (7)	4–3	Kontich (6)
155	Racing Mechelen (5)	5–4	Lille (5)
156	Gullegem (4)	3–0	Witgoor Sport (5)
157	Renaissance Mons (5)	4–0	Schelde Serskamp (8)
158	Pepingen-Halle (4)	2–2 (6–7 p)	Herk (6)
159	Verlaine (4)	4–2	Berg en Dal (6)
160	Wellen (5)	0–2	Voorde Appelterre (5)
161	Vorselaar (6)	0–0 (10–9 p)	Beringen (5)
162	RAAL La Louvière (4)	3–2	Ostiches (5)
163	Messancy (7)	1–3	RC Lauwe (6)
164	Meux (4)	2–1	De Kempen (5)
165	Braine (5)	2–1	Jodoigne (5)
166	Bilzerse Waltwilder (6)	1–1 (4–3 p)	Merelbeke (4)
167	Ardennen (6)	5–1	Wezel (6)
168	Berlare (6)	1–2	Heur-Tongeren (4)
169	Wolvertem Merchtem (5)	3–1	Tournai (5)
170	Achel (6)	3–1	Ster-Francorchamps B (9)
171	Lokeren-Temse (4)	3–1	Haasdonk (7)
172	Nismes (6)	2–3	Hoboken (7)
173	Berchem Sport B (8)	1–1 (2–4 p)	Union Namur (5)
174	Givry (4)	0–1	Gosselies Sports (5)
175	VC Groot Dilbeek (7)	2–3	Blankenberge (6)
176	Dikkelvenne (4)	7–2	Chevetogne (6)
177	Vaux-Chaudfontaine (7)	1–4	Wielsbeke (6)
178	Zwarte Leeuw (5)	2–1	RFC Wetteren (4)
179	Hamme (5)	3–0	Sprimont B (6)
180	Spouwen-Mopertingen (4)	4–0	Montignies (6)
181	Ganshoren (4)	4–1	Kosova Schaerbeek (6)
182	Hoegaarden-Outgaarden (6)	2–3	Oudenaarde (4)
183	Londerzeel (4)	1–0	Eeklo Meetjesland (7)
184	Menen (4)	5–0	Linden (6)
185	Entité Manageoise (5)	4–4 (4–2 p)	Solières (4)
186	Berchem (4)	1–0	KFC Turnhout (5)
187	Hamoir (4)	2–3	Onhaye (5)
188	Ninove (4)	2–3	Rapid Symphorinois (5)
189	Lyra-Lierse Berlaar (4)	2–0	Torpedo Hasselt (6)
190	Pont-a-Celles Buzet (5)	1–0	Cappellen (4)
191	Jeunesse Tamines (5)	2–0	Acren-Lessines (4)
192	St-Denijs Sport (7)	1–3	Olsa Brakel (4)
193	Zwevezele (4)	4–0	Rumbeke (6)

== Third round ==
This round of matches was played from 11 till 15 September 2020 and included the 80 winners from the Second Round together with 16 teams playing in the Belgian National Division 1. Teams from the Belgian National Division 1 were seeded and could not play each other. The lowest team in the competition came from the third provincial division (8th level): FC Tilleur. Note: Lierse Kempenzonen was promoted into the Belgian First Division B after the draw was made to fill up a vacant spot but no redraw was made.

Tie	Home team (tier)	Score	Away team (tier)
194	RFC Liège (3)	3–1	Waremme (4)
195	Londerzeel (4)	3–0	Gullegem (4)
196	Marloie Sport (5)	1–3	RAAL La Louvière (4)
197	Francs Borains (3)	2–0	Dikkelvenne (4)
198	Gosselies Sports (5)	1–3	Vorselaar (6)
199	Mandel United (3)	0–0 (2–4 p)	Zwevezele (4)
200	Ganshoren (4)	4–0	Oudenaarde (4)
201	Raeren-Eynatten (5)	0–4	Zelzate (4)
202	FC Tilleur (8)	0–6	Knokke (3)
203	Renaissance Mons (5)	1–1 (4–3 p)	Hombourg (7)
204	Jong Lede (5)	2–0	Schoonbeek-Beverst (6)
205	Jeunesse Tamines (5)	2–1	Herent (6)
206	Racing Mechelen (5)	0–4	La Louvière Centre (3)
207	Oppagne-Wéris (5)	1–3	Lochristi (5)
208	Achel (6)	1–3	Entité Manageoise (5)
209	Durbuy (4)	0–0 (5–4 p)	Verlaine (4)
210	Warnant (4)	1–1 (4–2 p)	Meux (4)
211	Harelbeke (4)	0–1	Wijgmaal (4)
212	Lyra-Lierse Berlaar (4)	2–1	Berchem (4)
213	Houtvenne (4)	1–1 (3–4 p)	Heur-Tongeren (4)
214	Aalst (4)	3–1	Sint-Eloois-Winkel (3)
215	St-Dymphna (7)	0–4	Rupel Boom (3)
216	City Pirates (4)	3–0	Wolvertem Merchtem (5)
217	Visé (3)	FF 5–0	Munkzwalm (6)

Tie	Home team (tier)	Score	Away team (tier)
218	Braine (5)	2–0	Zwarte Leeuw (5)
219	Bambrugge (5)	2–1	Ardennen (6)
220	Lierse Kempenzonen (2)	4–0	Hoboken (7)
221	Hades (4)	3–1	Herk (6)
222	Patro Eisden Maasmechelen (3)	3–0	Stockay (4)
223	Voorde Appelterre (5)	0–3	Petegem (4)
224	Esperanza Pelt (5)	5–3	Spouwen-Mopertingen (4)
225	Union Namur (5)	1–2	Jette (4)
226	Diegem (4)	0–1	Olsa Brakel (4)
227	Rochefort (5)	4–1	Westhoek (4)
228	Olympic Charleroi CF (3)	6–3	Sprimont (5)
229	Ronse (4)	1–2	Blankenberge (6)
230	Rebecq (4)	FF 5–0	Roeselare (3)
231	Bertem-Leefdaal (6)	0–1	Dender EH (3)
232	Groen Star Beek (6)	2–3	Wielsbeke (6)
233	Pont-a-Celles Buzet (5)	2–3	Hoogstraten (4)
234	SG-Tertre-Hautrage (5)	2–1	Tienen (3)
235	RC Lauwe (6)	1–3	Crossing Schaerbeek (5)
236	RC Gent (4)	3–1	Hamme (5)
237	Couvin-Mariembourg (4)	1–1 (2–4 p)	Bilzerse Waltwilder (6)
238	Tessenderlo (3)	3–0	Menen (4)
239	Dessel (3)	1–0	Rapid Symphorinois (5)
240	Heist (3)	3–0	Onhaye (5)
241	Hasselt (4)	1–1 (1–3 p)	Lokeren-Temse (4)

== Fourth round ==
This round of matches was played on 20 September 2020 and includes the 48 winners from the Third Round. Lowest ranked teams still available were Blankenberge, Wielsbeke, Bilzerse Waltwilder and Vorselaar, all playing at the sixth level (First Provincial Division).

Tie	Home team (tier)	Score	Away team (tier)
242	Bambrugge (5)	~~0–0 (4–4 p)~~ FF 0–5	SG-Tertre-Hautrage (5)
243	Zwevezele (4)	1–3	City Pirates (4)
244	Olympic Charleroi CF (3)	2–1	Lierse Kempenzonen (2)
245	Hoogstraten (4)	1–3	Dessel (3)
246	Crossing Schaerbeek (5)	0–4	Knokke (3)
247	Blankenberge (6)	3–2	RC Gent (4)
248	Londerzeel (4)	0–2	Tessenderlo (3)
249	Jette (4)	2–0	Braine (5)
250	Heur-Tongeren (4)	2–1	Esperanza Pelt (5)
251	Rebecq (4)	FF 0–5	Petegem (4)
252	Visé (3)	2–1	La Louvière Centre (3)
253	Heist (3)	4–0	Lochristi (5)

Tie	Home team (tier)	Score	Away team (tier)
254	Renaissance Mons (5)	0–1	Olsa Brakel (4)
255	Lokeren-Temse (4)	3–0	Wielsbeke (6)
256	Bilzerse Waltwilder (6)	1–2	Rochefort (5)
257	Lyra-Lierse Berlaar (4)	0–1	RAAL La Louvière (4)
258	Durbuy (4)	0–2	Hades (4)
259	Ganshoren (4)	0–1	Dender EH (3)
260	Rupel Boom (3)	4–0	Wijgmaal (4)
261	Francs Borains (3)	2–3	Zelzate (4)
262	Aalst (4)	1–0	Jeunesse Tamines (5)
263	Vorselaar (6)	0–3	RFC Liège (3)
264	Jong Lede (5)	2–1	Patro Eisden Maasmechelen (3)
265	Warnant (4)	5–2	Entité Manageoise (5)

== Fifth round ==
This round of matches was played on 10 and 11 October 2020 and includes the 24 winners from the Fourth Round together with the teams from the Belgian First Division B (with the exception of U23 team Club NXT which was ineligible, and Lierse Kempenzonen which already entered in the Third Round) and two teams from the Belgian First Division A, Oud-Heverlee Leuven and Waasland-Beveren. The lowest-ranked team still available was Blankenberge, all playing at the sixth level (First Provincial Division).

10 October 2020 Match 266	Tessenderlo (3)	3–1 (a.e.t.)	Deinze (2)	Tessenderlo
19:30 CEST	Battista 31'; Stefani 103'; Vaesen 112'		De Schutter 90'	Stadium: Gemeentelijk Sportpark; Referee: Tom Stevens

11 October 2020 Match 267	Lommel (2)	3–2	Zelzate (4)	Lommel
16:00 CEST	Moreno 25'; Hendrickx 68' (pen.); Brebels 75'		Vandenhende 40'; Broeckaert 62'	Stadium: Soevereinstadion; Referee: Pieter Vandevenne

10 October 2020 Match 268	Rochefort (5)	1–8	RWDM47 (2)	Rochefort
17:00 CEST	Monmart 55'		Walbrecq 26', 74'; Rocha 37', 39', 45'; Senakuku 70'; Lavie 82', 87'	Stadium: Parc Roches; Referee: Arnaud Soors

11 October 2020 Match 269	Union SG (2)	4–0	Heist (3)	Forest, Brussels
16:00 CEST	Sigurðarson 21'; Undav 82'; Vanzeir 84' (pen.); Lapoussin 90'			Stadium: Stade Joseph Marien; Referee: Anthony Letellier

11 October 2020 Match 270	Westerlo (2)	5–1	Hades (4)	Westerlo
16:00 CEST	Van Eenoo 3'; Gboho 10'; Çiçek 32', 65', 89'		Vanratingen 64' (pen.)	Stadium: Het Kuipje; Referee: Thomas Vanboven

11 October 2020 Match 271	Olsa Brakel (4)	2–0	Dender EH (3)	Brakel
16:00 CEST	Nelis 55'; Cordie 90+1' (pen.)			Stadium: Stephan Van den Berghe Stadion; Referee: Niels Bossuyt

11 October 2020 Match 272	Warnant (4)	0–1	RFC Liège (3)	Warnant-Dreye
16:00 CEST			Lallemand 10'	Stadium: Complexe Sportif; Referee: Farid Louai

11 October 2020 Match 273	RAAL La Louvière (4)	2–0	Jette (4)	La Louvière
16:00 CEST	Azevedo-Janelas 35'; Gálvez López 90'			Stadium: Stade Communal du Tivoli; Referee: Guillaume Chaspierre

10 October 2020 Match 274	Jong Lede (5)	0–2	Lokeren-Temse (4)	Lede
20:00 CEST			Oliveira 34' (pen.); Cabumi 64'	Stadium: Sportcomplex Ommegang; Referee: Michiel Allaerts

10 October 2020 Match 275	City Pirates (4)	1–2	Rupel Boom (3)	Merksem
20:00 CEST	Ernst 31'		Nzinga 39'; Mrani 65'	Stadium: Jef Mermansstadion; Referee: Hannes De Couvreur

10 October 2020 Match 276	Waasland-Beveren (1)	3–0	Petegem (4)	Beveren
19:00 CEST	Heymans 30'; Frey 52', 84'			Stadium: Freethiel Stadion; Referee: Florian Stove

11 October 2020 Match 277	Knokke (3)	0–2	OH Leuven (1)	Knokke-Heist
16:00 CEST			Mercier 34'; Duplus 89'	Stadium: Stadion Olivier; Referee: Simon Bourdeaud'hui

11 October 2020 Match 278	Visé (3)	1–2 (a.e.t.)	Dessel (3)	Visé
16:00 CEST	Mputu 26'		Cerigioni 10'; Boulaouali 102'	Stadium: Stade de la Cité de l'Oie; Referee: Quentin Malhaise

11 October 2020 Match 279	Seraing (2)	6–1	Blankenberge (6)	Seraing
16:00 CEST	Cascio 5', 39'; Al Badaoui 8', 16' (pen.) unknown 77' (o.g.); N'Diaye 83'		Longueville 66'	Stadium: Stade du Pairay; Referee: Théophile Diskeuve

11 October 2020 Match 280	Heur-Tongeren (4)	3–0	SG-Tertre-Hautrage (5)	Tongeren
16:00 CEST	Camara 35', 75'; Dango 77'			Stadium: Eburons Dome Sportoase; Referee: Arne De Beuckelaer

11 October 2020 Match 281	Olympic Charleroi CF (3)	2–1 (a.e.t.)	Aalst (4)	Montignies-sur-Sambre
15:00 CEST	Gadi 1'; Jatta 103'		Cobos Copado 42'	Stadium: Stade de la Neuville; Referee: Charles-Henri Boeur

== Sixth round ==
The draw for the sixth round was made on 12 October and included the teams from the Belgian First Division A, with the exception of Waasland-Beveren and OH Leuven which had entered in the prior round. The 16 teams entering at this stage were seeded and could not meet each other. Lowest teams still in the competition are RAAL La Louvière, Heur-Tongeren, Lokeren-Temse and Olsa Brakel, all from the Belgian Division 2 (tier 4).

As part of containment measures taken to limit to spread of the COVID-19 disease in the second half of October, amateur clubs were not allowed to organize group training sessions until mid-December, making it very difficult for these teams to prepare for the cup matches. Therefore, in November 2020 the matches were postponed from their initial dates (15, 16, and 17 December 2020) to 9 and 10 January 2021. Additionally, amateur clubs hosting matches without field-heating installations might lose their home advantage if weather conditions prove too challenging. With the containment measures in Belgium prolonged and amateur teams not allowed to play matches prior to 15 January unless adhering to the (expensive) professional sports protocols, an agreement was found in December with the amateur teams still in the cup to postpone all matches further, now from 9 and 10 January 2021 to the midweek of 2 to 4 February 2021. With no further postponements possible, in case further containment measures prevent the amateur teams from restarting on 15 January, these teams will be excluded from the competition, receiving some financial compensation in return. On 17 January, K.F.C. Dessel Sport forfeited their match, after the mayor of Dessel had not allowed Dessel Sport to follow the protocol of the professional football clubs, making it impossible for them to prepare for their cup tie with Beerschot. Beerschot immediately progressed to the next round. On January 19, for the same reasons, both Rupel Boom and Tessenderlo also forfeited their matches, respectively against Eupen and Genk. Eupen and Genk progressed automatically to the seventh round.

2 February 2021	Antwerp (1)	2–1	RAAL La Louvière (4)	Antwerp
18:00 CET	Mbenza 20'; De Laet 73'	report	Lazitch 58'	Stadium: Bosuilstadion; Attendance: 0

2 February 2021	Union SG (2)	2–1	Excel Mouscron (1)	Forest, Brussels
18:00 CET	Vanzeir 79'; Nielsen 90+2'	report	Bakić 30'	Stadium: Stade Joseph Marien; Attendance: 0

2 February 2021	Dessel (3)	0–5 FF	Beerschot (1)	Dessel
18:00 CET				Stadium: Armand Melisstadion; Attendance: 0

2 February 2021	Rupel Boom (3)	0–5 FF	Eupen (1)	Boom
18:00 CET				Stadium: Gemeentelijk Parkstadion; Attendance: 0

2 February 2021	Tessenderlo (3)	0–5 FF	Genk (1)	Tessenderlo
18:00 CET				Stadium: Gemeentelijk Sportpark; Attendance: 0

2 February 2021	Lommel (2)	1–3	Kortrijk (1)	Lommel
18:00 CET	Kis 71' (pen.)	report	Guèye 14'; Chevalier 61'; Selemani 90+3'	Stadium: Soevereinstadion; Attendance: 0

3 February 2021	KV Mechelen (1)	2–0	RWDM (2)	Mechelen
16:00 CET	Druijf 28'; Shved 65'	report		Stadium: Achter de Kazerne; Attendance: 0

3 February 2021	Charleroi (1)	1–0	Westerlo (2)	Charleroi
18:00 CET	Teodorczyk 87'	report		Stadium: Stade du Pays de Charleroi; Attendance: 0

3 February 2021	Gent (1)	5–0	Heur-Tongeren (4)	Ghent
18:00 CET	Tissoudali 26'; Bezus 35'; Samoise 54'; Niangbo 79'; Mbayo 90+2' (pen.)	report		Stadium: Ghelamco Arena; Attendance: 0

3 February 2021	OH Leuven (1)	2–3	Cercle Brugge (1)	Heverlee, Leuven
18:00 CET	Maertens 3'; Hubert 90+3'	report	Hotić 1' (pen.); Marcelin 39'; Taravel 73' (pen.)	Stadium: Den Dreef; Attendance: 0

3 February 2021	Seraing (2)	1–4	Standard Liège (1)	Seraing
19:00 CET	Mouhli 85' (pen.)	report	Bokadi 3'; Jans 36'; Klauss 67'; Muleka 90+1'	Stadium: Stade du Pairay; Attendance: 0

3 February 2021	Club Brugge (1)	6–1	Olsa Brakel (4)	Bruges
19:30 CET	Vanaken 2'; Badji 21', 60', 74'; Nelis 51' (o.g.); Chong 69'	Report	Haezebroeck 9'	Stadium: Jan Breydel Stadium; Attendance: 0

3 February 2021	Lokeren-Temse (4)	0–2	Sint-Truiden (1)	Lokeren
20:00 CET		Report	Nazon 8'; Ito 62'	Stadium: Daknamstadion; Attendance: 0

3 February 2021	Waasland-Beveren (1)	2–3	Oostende (1)	Beveren
20:00 CET	Frey 24'; Faucher 54'	Report	Gueye 40', 72'; Hjulsager 76'	Stadium: Freethiel Stadion; Attendance: 0

3 February 2021	Olympic Charleroi CF (3)	1–0	Zulte Waregem (1)	Montignies-sur-Sambre
20:00 CET	Delbergue 78'	Report		Stadium: Stade de la Neuville; Attendance: 0

3 February 2021	RFC Liège (3)	0–2	Anderlecht (1)	Liège
21:15 CET		Report	Mukairu 29'; Ashimeru 67'	Stadium: Stade de Rocourt; Attendance: 0

== Seventh round ==
With the seventh round scheduled just one week after the sixth round, the draw was already made on 8 January 2021, before the previous round was even played. The lowest team still in the competition was Olympic Charleroi CF, the only non-professional team to make it this far.

9 February 2021	Cercle Brugge (1)	3–1	Oostende (1)	Bruges
18:00 CET	Deman 32'; Denkey 64'; Ugbo 90'	Report	Bätzner 29'	Stadium: Jan Breydel Stadium; Attendance: 0 Referee: Bert Put

9 February 2021	Kortrijk (1)	1–1 (a.e.t.) (5–6 p)	Standard Liège (1)	Kortrijk
20:00 CET	Selemani 90+2'	Report	Laifis 36'	Stadium: Guldensporen Stadion; Attendance: 0 Referee: Lothar D'hondt
	Penalties
	Chevalier (penalty scored); Makarenko (penalty scored); Stojanović (penalty scored); Derijck (penalty missed); Selemani (penalty scored); Guèye (penalty scored); Sainsbury (penalty missed)		(penalty scored) Bastien; (penalty scored) Klauss; (penalty scored) Dussenne; (penalty missed) Muleka; (penalty scored) Raskin; (penalty scored) Laifis; (penalty scored) Siquet

10 February 2021	Eupen (1)	5–1	Olympic Charleroi CF (3)	Eupen
17:00 CET	Koné 8'; Baby 50'; Magnée 61'; Koch 65'; Bushiri 90+3'	Report	Delbergue 14' (pen.)	Stadium: Kehrwegstadion; Attendance: 0 Referee: Christof Dierick

10 February 2021	Genk (1)	1–0	Sint-Truiden (1)	Genk
18:00 CET	Onuachu 87'	Report		Stadium: Luminus Arena; Attendance: 0 Referee: Alexandre Boucaut

10 February 2021	Club Brugge (1)	3–1	Antwerp (1)	Bruges
20:45 CET	Vanaken 49'; Dost 81'; Vormer 85'	Report	Lamkel Zé 83'	Stadium: Jan Breydel Stadium; Attendance: 0 Referee: Erik Lambrechts

11 February 2021	Beerschot (1)	0–1	KV Mechelen (1)	Antwerp
18:00 CET		Report	Schoofs 49'	Stadium: Olympic Stadium; Attendance: 0 Referee: Kevin Van Damme

11 February 2021	Gent (1)	3–1	Charleroi (1)	Ghent
18:00 CET	Yaremchuk 74'; Odjidja-Ofoe 81'; Berahino 83' (o.g.)	Report	Nicholson 1'	Stadium: Ghelamco Arena; Attendance: 0 Referee: Lawrence Visser

11 February 2021	Union SG (2)	0–5	Anderlecht (1)	Forest, Brussels
20:45 CET		Report	Nmecha 16', 57'; Mukairu 61'; Diaby 71' (pen.), 82'	Stadium: Stade Joseph Marien; Attendance: 0

== Quarter-finals ==
The draw for the quarter-finals was made on 11 February 2021, right after the conclusion of the last match of the previous round, Union SG vs Anderlecht. Only teams from the top division were still present in the tournament.

3 March 2021	Eupen (1)	1–0	Gent (1)	Eupen
18:00 CET	Heris 49'	Report		Stadium: Kehrwegstadion; Attendance: 0 Referee: Jan Boterberg

3 March 2021	Anderlecht (1)	1–0	Cercle Brugge (1)	Anderlecht
20:45 CET	Nmecha 13'	Report		Stadium: Constant Vanden Stock Stadium; Attendance: 0 Referee: Bram Van Driessche

4 March 2021	Genk (1)	4–1	KV Mechelen (1)	Genk
18:00 CET	Thorstvedt 2', 64'; Muñoz 10'; Bongonda 85'	Report	Mrabti 82'	Stadium: Luminus Arena; Attendance: 0 Referee: Nicolas Laforge

4 March 2021	Standard Liège (1)	1–0	Club Brugge (1)	Liège
20:45 CET	Muleka 49'	Report		Stadium: Stade Maurice Dufrasne; Attendance: 0 Referee: Nathan Verboomen

== Semi-finals ==
The draw for the semi-finals was made on 4 March 2021, right after the conclusion of the last match of the previous round, Standard Liège vs Club Brugge.

13 March 2021	Eupen (1)	0–1	Standard Liège (1)	Eupen
20:45 CET		Report	Amallah 67'	Stadium: Kehrwegstadion

14 March 2021	Anderlecht (1)	1–2	Genk (1)	Anderlecht
20:45 CET	Trebel 75'	Report	Onuachu 18'; Miazga 60' (o.g.)	Stadium: Constant Vanden Stock Stadium; Attendance: 0 Referee: Jonathan Lardot

== Final ==
25 April 2021
20:45 CEST

Standard Liège	1–2	Genk
Muleka 83'	Report	Itō 48'; Bongonda 80'

King Baudouin Stadium, Brussels
Attendance: 0 (Note: The final was played behind closed doors due to the COVID-19 pandemic in Belgium.)
Referee: Bram Van Driessche

== Notes ==
1. Tie reversed after the original draw.
2. Tie reversed after the original draw as home team stadium has no field heating installed or another possibility to cover the field, with possibly severe weather in the days before the match.
3. The match between Bambrugge and Tertre-Hautrage was stopped during the penalty shootout at a score of 4–4 due to racist comments from supporters towards a Tertre-Hautrage player. After extra-time, the match had finished 0–0. Eventually, Bambrugge was penalized with a 0–5 loss by forfeit.
4. To fill open spots, several teams were promoted after the draw was made. In theory, these teams would thus have started one or two rounds later.
5. With the Belgian First Division A expanded from 16 to 18 teams, two teams had to start a round earlier.
