= 2020–21 Belgian Division 3 =

Belgian Division 3
- Season: 2020–21

The 2020–21 Belgian Division 3 was the fifth season of the division in its current format, placed at the fifth-tier of football in Belgium and the first under this name, after being renamed (Belgian) Division 3 from (Belgian) Third Amateur Division. The season was cancelled in January 2021 with just a few matches played, as measures taken by the Belgian government against the spread of COVID-19 prohibited amateur football.

The division consist of four separate leagues. Leagues VFV A and VFV B consist of teams with a license from the Voetbalfederatie Vlaanderen (VFV, the Flemish/Dutch speaking wing of the Belgian FA), while the leagues ACFF A and ACFF B contain teams with a license from the Association des Clubs Francophones de Football (ACFF, the French-speaking wing of the RBFA). The champions from each of the four leagues would normally have been promoted to the 2021–22 Belgian Division 2, but due to the cancellation no teams were promoted or relegated.

== Team changes ==
=== In ===
- Hamme, Sint-Niklaas, Namur FLV and Onhaye were all relegated from the 2019–20 Belgian Second Amateur Division.
- Lille, Koersel, Voorde-Appelterre and Oostkamp were promoted as champions of the Flemish Belgian Provincial Leagues, respectively in Antwerp, Limburg, East Flanders and West Flanders.
- Binche, Dison, Marloie and Tamines were promoted as champions of the Walloon Belgian Provincial Leagues, respectively in Hainaut, Liège, Luxembourg and Namur.
- Crossing Schaerbeek was promoted as the champion of the French-speaking teams in the region matching the former Province of Brabant and Brussels.
- Diest was promoted as the champion of the Flemish-speaking teams in the region matching the former Province of Brabant and Brussels.
- With the 2019–20 season ending prematurely due to the COVID-19 pandemic in Belgium, all vacant positions were filled up by the highest finishing teams from the same province as the disappearing clubs. Clubs promoted as a result per province:
  - Antwerp: Racing Mechelen, De Kempen, Berlaar-Heikant, Nijlen
  - Flemish-speaking teams from the former Province of Brabant and Brussels: Rhodienne-De Hoek
  - French-speaking teams from the former Province of Brabant and Brussels: Stockel
  - East Flanders: Bambrugge
  - Liège: Wanze Bas-Oha
  - Luxembourg: Gouvy
  - West Flanders: Anzegem

=== Out ===
- Zelzate was promoted after winning the 2019–20 Belgian Third Amateur Division A.
- Lyra-Lierse was promoted after winning the 2019–20 Belgian Third Amateur Division B.
- Ganshoren was promoted after winning the 2019–20 Belgian Third Amateur Division C.
- Warnant was promoted after winning the 2019–20 Belgian Third Amateur Division D.
- As no promotion play-offs could be held due to the 2019–20 season ending prematurely due to the COVID-19 pandemic in Belgium, Ninove, Brakel, Wetteren, City Pirates, Heur-Tongeren, Houtvenne, Ganshoren and Jette were all promoted based on their finishing position.
- Based on their finishing positions at the bottom of the table, Oostnieuwkerke, Bornem, Bilzen, Helson Helchteren, Linden, Kosova Schaerbeek, Léopold Uccle, Wavre, Spy, Meix-devant-Virton and Ciney were all relegated to the Belgian Provincial Leagues.
- Furthermore two clubs were without a license and hence were also relegated to the Belgian Provincial Leagues: Wingene (had not applied for a license) and Walhain (moved to Beauvechain and changed its name to FC Golden Black causing its license to be removed).

== Belgian Division 3 VFV A ==
Locations of the 2020–21 Belgian Division 3 VFV A teams

=== League table ===
Pos	Team	Pld	W	D	L	GF	GA	GD	Pts
1	Stekene	4	3	1	0	7	2	+5	10
2	Lebbeke	4	2	2	0	9	5	+4	8
3	Overijse	3	2	1	0	7	3	+4	7
4	Oostkamp	4	2	1	1	10	8	+2	7
5	Lochristi	3	2	0	1	8	6	+2	6
6	Bambrugge	4	2	0	2	3	4	−1	6
7	Torhout	4	1	1	2	8	8	0	4
8	Hamme	3	1	1	1	4	4	0	4
9	Anzegem	4	1	1	2	3	5	−2	4
10	Wolvertem Merchtem	4	1	1	2	6	9	−3	4
11	Sint-Niklaas	2	1	0	1	3	5	−2	3
12	Voorde-Appelterre	3	0	3	0	5	5	0	3
13	Eppegem	2	0	2	0	3	3	0	2
14	Lede	3	0	2	1	1	2	−1	2
15	Rhodienne-De Hoek	3	0	1	2	4	6	−2	1
16	Melsele	4	0	1	3	4	10	−6	1

Source: vbal4
Rules for classification: 1) Points; 2) Matches won; 3) Goal difference; 4) Goals scored; 5) Away matches won; 6) Goal difference in away matches; 7) Away goals scored.

== Belgian Division 3 VFV B ==
Locations of the 2020–21 Belgian Division 3 VFV B teams

=== League table ===
Pos	Team	Pld	W	D	L	GF	GA	GD	Pts
1	Betekom	4	3	0	1	11	6	+5	9
2	Nijlen	4	3	0	1	9	7	+2	9
3	Berlaar-Heikant	4	2	2	0	9	6	+3	8
4	Lille	4	2	1	1	13	7	+6	7
5	Termien	4	2	1	1	11	8	+3	7
6	Esperanza Pelt	3	2	0	1	8	4	+4	6
7	Witgoor	4	2	0	2	7	6	+1	6
8	Sint-Lenaarts	4	2	0	2	8	9	−1	6
9	Racing Mechelen	4	2	0	2	5	9	−4	6
10	Diest	4	1	1	2	6	7	−1	4
11	Zwarte Leeuw	3	1	1	1	5	6	−1	4
12	Turnhout	3	1	0	2	3	7	−4	3
13	Wellen	4	0	3	1	5	6	−1	3
14	De Kempen	4	0	2	2	4	6	−2	2
15	Beringen	4	0	2	2	4	8	−4	2
16	Koersel	3	0	1	2	4	10	−6	1

Source: vbal4
Rules for classification: 1) Points; 2) Matches won; 3) Goal difference; 4) Goals scored; 5) Away matches won; 6) Goal difference in away matches; 7) Away goals scored.

== Belgian Division 3 ACFF A ==
Locations of the 2020–21 Belgian Division 3 ACFF A teams

=== League table ===
Pos	Team	Pld	W	D	L	GF	GA	GD	Pts	Qualification or relegation
1	Tamines	4	4	0	0	12	4	+8	12	
2	Crossing Schaerbeek	4	3	1	0	11	4	+7	10	
3	Namur FLV	4	3	1	0	8	1	+7	10	
4	Binche	4	2	1	1	8	7	+1	7	
5	CS Braine	4	2	1	1	4	3	+1	7	
6	Manageoise	2	2	0	0	4	0	+4	6	
7	Aische	3	2	0	1	4	3	+1	6	
8	Stade Brainois (Note: On 3 April 2020, Stade Braine announced it would merge with neighboring Tubize to form Royale Union Tubize-Braine, which will start playing at the current level of Tubize, the Belgian Division 2. As such, the place of Stade Braine in the Belgian Division 3 will be vacated.)	4	1	1	2	5	5	0	4	Merged into Tubize
9	Stockel	4	1	1	2	9	10	−1	4	
10	Symphorinois	4	1	1	2	5	6	−1	4	
11	Ostiches-Ath	3	1	0	2	2	4	−2	3	
12	Mons	4	1	0	3	5	12	−7	3	
13	Tournai	3	0	1	2	2	4	−2	1	
14	Saint-Ghislain	3	0	1	2	2	7	−5	1	
15	Gosselies	4	0	1	3	5	11	−6	1	
16	Pont-à-Celles-Buzet	2	0	0	2	1	6	−5	0	

Source: vbal4
Rules for classification: 1) Points; 2) Matches won; 3) Goal difference; 4) Goals scored; 5) Away matches won; 6) Goal difference in away matches; 7) Away goals scored.

== Belgian Division 3 ACFF B ==
Locations of the 2020–21 Belgian Division 3 ACFF B teams

=== League table ===
Pos	Team	Pld	W	D	L	GF	GA	GD	Pts
1	Dison	3	2	1	0	7	2	+5	7
2	Mormont	3	2	1	0	6	2	+4	7
3	Richelle	2	2	0	0	6	2	+4	6
4	Habay	3	2	0	1	7	7	0	6
5	Herstal	3	2	0	1	5	5	0	6
6	Jodoigne	4	2	0	2	8	9	−1	6
7	Raeren-Eynatten	3	1	1	1	6	5	+1	4
8	Onhaye	3	1	0	2	7	5	+2	3
9	Rochefort	2	1	0	1	4	5	−1	3
10	Aywaille	2	1	0	1	3	4	−1	3
11	Huy	3	1	0	2	5	8	−3	3
12	Oppagne-Wéris	2	0	1	1	1	2	−1	1
13	Gouvy	2	0	1	1	3	5	−2	1
14	Sprimont	2	0	1	1	1	3	−2	1
15	Wanze Bas-Oha	1	0	0	1	0	2	−2	0
16	Marloie	2	0	0	2	4	7	−3	0

Source: vbal4
Rules for classification: 1) Points; 2) Matches won; 3) Goal difference; 4) Goals scored; 5) Away matches won; 6) Goal difference in away matches; 7) Away goals scored.

== Number of teams by provinces ==
Number of teams	Province or region	Team(s) in VFV A	Team(s) in VFV B	Team(s) in ACFF A	Team(s) in ACFF B
10	Hainaut	–	–	Binche, Stade Braine, Gosselies, Manage, Ostiches-Ath, P-à-Celles, Ren. Mons, Saint-Ghislain, Symphorinois, Tournai	none
9	Antwerp	none	Berlaar-H., De Kempen, Lille, KRC Mechelen, Nijlen, Sint-Lenaarts, Turnhout, Witgoor and Zwarte Leeuw	–	–
9	East Flanders	Bambrugge, Hamme, Lebbeke, Lede, Lochristi, Melsele, Sint-Niklaas, Stekene and Voorde-Appelterre	none	–	–
8	Liège	–	–	none	Aywaille, Dison, Herstal, Huy, Raeren-Eynatten, Richelle, Sprimont, Wanze Bas-Oha
6	Flemish Brabant	Eppegem, Overijse, Rhode-De Hoek and Wolvertem Merchtem	Betekom and Diest	–	–
5	Limburg	none	Beringen, Koersel, Pelt, Termien and Wellen	–	–
5	Luxembourg	–	–	none	Gouvy, Habay, Marloie, Mormont, Oppagne-Wéris
5	Namur	–	–	Aische, Namur FLV and Tamines	Onhaye, Rochefort
4	Walloon Brabant	–	–	CS Braine, Schaerbeek and Stockel	Jodoigne
3	West Flanders	Anzegem, Oostkamp, Torhout	none	–	–
0	Brussels	none	none	none	none
