= Jos Van Riel =

Belgian footballer (1943–2023)

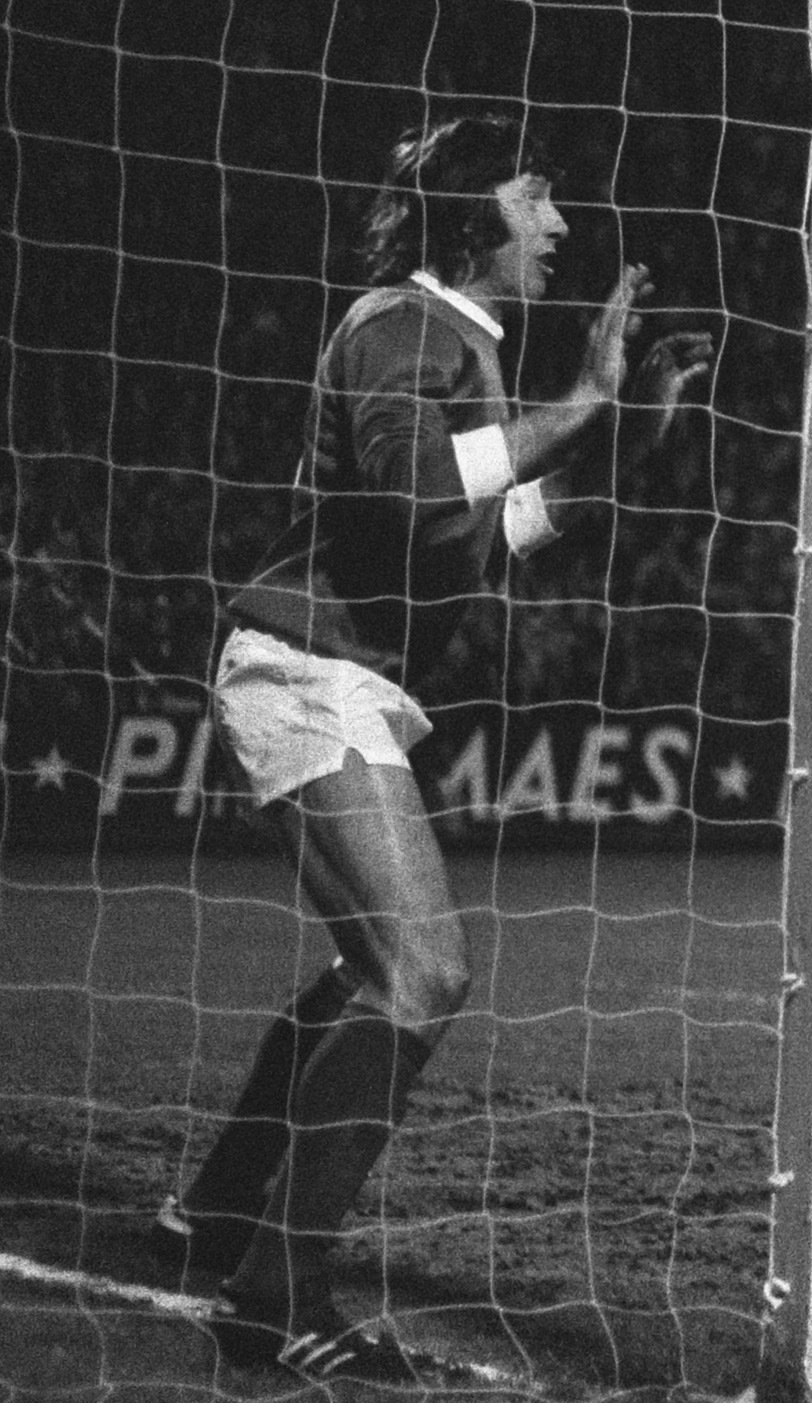
- Van Riel with Antwerp

Personal information
- Full name: Jozef Van Riel
- Date of birth: 16 November 1943
- Place of birth: Ekeren, Belgium
- Date of death: 19 January 2023 (aged 79)
- Place of death: Antwerp, Belgium
- Position: Defender

Senior career*
Years	Team	Apps	(Gls)
1967–1970	Sportkring Sint-Niklaas		
1970–1973	K.F.C. Diest		
1973–1976	Antwerp	99	(8)
- * Club domestic league appearances and goals

Jozef Van Riel (16 November 1943 – 19 January 2023) was a Belgian footballer who played as a defender.

== Biography ==
Van Riel started playing football in Ekeren Donk. He later played in Kalmthout and afterwards at Sportkring Sint-Niklaas in Sint-Niklaas and at K.F.C. Diest in Diest. In 1973 he signed a contract with Royal Antwerp. He played 99 matches for the team in the Belgian Pro League, the Belgian Cup and in UEFA Europa League matches. Playing as a defender he had shirt number one and scored eight league goals. In his first two seasons, 1973–74 Belgian First Division and 1974–75 Belgian First Division, he became vice champion of Belgium. In its third and last year he finished eleventh with the team at the 1975–76 Belgian First Division. In 1975 he was on the team during the 1974–75 Belgian Cup where they lost 1–0 to Anderlecht.

Van Riel died on 19 January 2023, at the age of 79.

== Other websites ==
- Jos Van Riel at WorldFootball.net
