= 2020 Belgian Super Cup =

Club Brugge	Antwerp
League winners	Cup winners
- Match cancelled due to COVID-19 pandemic
- Date: July 2020
- Venue: Jan Breydel Stadium, Bruges

The 2020 Belgian Super Cup was a football match that was planned to be played in late July or early August 2020, as opener of the 2020–21 Belgian football season, between the winners of the 2018–19 Belgian First Division A and the winners of the 2018–19 Belgian Cup, but was cancelled due to the COVID-19 pandemic in Belgium. Due to the COVID-19 outbreak, all football in Belgium was cancelled from mid-March until the end of July. While the decision was made to discontinue the league, awarding the title to league leaders Club Brugge and the entry tickets into the UEFA competitions based on finishing positions, the 2020 Belgian Cup Final was not cancelled but instead rescheduled to be played on 1 August 2020, instead of organizing the 2020 Belgian Super Cup (which would, in any case, be disputed by the same teams as champions Club Brugge had also qualified for the cup final).

== See also ==
- 2020–21 Belgian First Division A
- 2020–21 Belgian Cup
