= 2020–21 Belgian Division 2 =

Belgian Division 2
- Season: 2020–21

The 2020–21 Belgian Division 2 was the fifth season of the division in its current format, placed at the fourth-tier of football in Belgium and the first under this name, after being renamed (Belgian) Division 2 from (Belgian) Second Amateur Division. The season was cancelled in January 2021 with just a few matches played, as measures taken by the Belgian government against the spread of COVID-19 prohibited amateur football.

The division consisted of three separate leagues. Leagues VFV A and VFV B consist of teams with a license from the Voetbalfederatie Vlaanderen (VFV, the Flemish/Dutch speaking wing of the Belgian FA) and contain 16 teams, while the ACFF league contains teams with a license from the Association des Clubs Francophones de Football (ACFF, the French-speaking wing of the RBFA) and contains 17 teams. The champions from each of the three leagues would normally have been promoted to the 2021–22 Belgian National Division 1, but due to the cancellation no teams were promoted or relegated.

== Team changes ==
=== In ===
- Tubize after finishing in the relegation zone in the 2019–20 Belgian First Amateur Division.
- Zelzate was promoted after winning the 2019–20 Belgian Third Amateur Division A.
- Lyra-Lierse was promoted after winning the 2019–20 Belgian Third Amateur Division B.
- Ganshoren was promoted after winning the 2019–20 Belgian Third Amateur Division C.
- Warnant was promoted after winning the 2019–20 Belgian Third Amateur Division D.
- As no promotion play-offs could be held due to the 2019–20 season ending prematurely due to the COVID-19 pandemic in Belgium, Ninove, Brakel, Wetteren, City Pirates, Heur-Tongeren, Houtvenne and Jette were all promoted based on their finishing position.
- Virton were refused both a professional football license and a remunerated football license, meaning they were relegated two levels, coming in directly from the 2019–20 Belgian First Division B.

=== Out ===
- Knokke was promoted after winning the 2019–20 Belgian Second Amateur Division A.
- Tienen was promoted after winning the 2019–20 Belgian Second Amateur Division B.
- Francs Borains was promoted after winning the 2019–20 Belgian Second Amateur Division C.
- Hamme, Sint-Niklaas, Namur FLV and Onhaye were all relegated after finishing in the relegation positions the previous season.
- Duffel did not complete the previous season due to financial difficulties and was hence automatically relegated.
- Vosselaar and Tilleur decided not to apply for a football license, while Geel did apply for a license but wasn't awarded one, resulting in all three teams being relegated.

==== Merger ====
- Temse merged with Lokeren to become K.S.C. Lokeren-Temse, known as Lokeren-Temse. Strictly speaking, the new club is a continuation of Temse rather than Lokeren, as the latter club has been dissolved.

== Belgian Division 2 VFV A ==
Locations of the 2020–21 Belgian Division 2 VFV A teams

=== League table ===
Pos	Team	Pld	W	D	L	GF	GA	GD	Pts
1	Ninove	4	4	0	0	9	3	+6	12
2	Gent-Zeehaven	4	2	2	0	7	5	+2	8
3	Oudenaarde	4	2	1	1	9	4	+5	7
4	Petegem	3	2	0	1	4	1	+3	6
5	Harelbeke	4	1	3	0	8	5	+3	6
6	Dikkelvenne	4	1	3	0	7	5	+2	6
7	Olsa Brakel	3	1	2	0	4	2	+2	5
8	Merelbeke	4	1	2	1	4	2	+2	5
9	Lokeren-Temse	3	1	2	0	4	3	+1	5
10	Zwevezele	3	1	1	1	2	2	0	4
11	Zelzate	3	0	3	0	5	5	0	3
12	Wetteren	4	0	2	2	3	6	−3	2
13	Ronse	4	0	2	2	4	8	−4	2
14	Menen	3	0	1	2	4	9	−5	1
15	Gullegem	4	0	1	3	1	7	−6	1
16	Westhoek	4	0	1	3	3	11	−8	1

Source: vbal4
Rules for classification: 1) Points; 2) Matches won; 3) Goal difference; 4) Goals scored; 5) Away matches won; 6) Goal difference in away matches; 7) Away goals scored.

== Belgian Division 2 VFV B ==
Locations of the 2020–21 Belgian Division 2 VFV B teams

=== League table ===
Pos	Team	Pld	W	D	L	GF	GA	GD	Pts
1	Bocholt	4	3	1	0	11	5	+6	10
2	Hoogstraten	4	2	1	1	9	4	+5	7
3	Lyra-Lierse	4	2	1	1	7	4	+3	7
4	Hasselt	3	2	1	0	6	3	+3	7
5	Diegem	4	2	1	1	8	7	+1	7
6	Londerzeel	4	2	1	1	7	9	−2	7
7	Hades	3	2	0	1	9	3	+6	6
8	Pepingen-Halle	3	2	0	1	5	3	+2	6
9	Berchem	3	1	2	0	4	3	+1	5
10	Houtvenne	4	1	1	2	4	7	−3	4
11	Cappellen	3	1	0	2	6	6	0	3
12	Spouwen-Mopertingen	3	1	0	2	5	8	−3	3
13	Heur-Tongeren	3	0	1	2	1	7	−6	1
14	Aalst	2	0	0	2	1	3	−2	0
15	City Pirates	2	0	0	2	3	7	−4	0
16	Wijgmaal	3	0	0	3	2	9	−7	0

Source: vbal4
Rules for classification: 1) Points; 2) Matches won; 3) Goal difference; 4) Goals scored; 5) Away matches won; 6) Goal difference in away matches; 7) Away goals scored.

== Belgian Division 2 ACFF ==
Locations of the 2019–20 Belgian Division 2 ACFF teams

=== League table ===
Pos	Team	Pld	W	D	L	GF	GA	GD	Pts	Qualification or relegation
1	Tubize	3	3	0	0	9	2	+7	9	
2	Ganshoren	3	2	1	0	6	4	+2	7	
3	Stockay	4	2	1	1	6	5	+1	7	
4	La Louvière	2	2	0	0	10	0	+10	6	
5	Hamoir	4	2	0	2	10	7	+3	6	
6	Givry	4	1	2	1	6	6	0	5	
7	Jette	2	1	0	1	4	2	+2	3	
8	Solières	3	1	0	2	6	6	0	3	
9	Couvin-Mariembourg	2	1	0	1	3	5	−2	3	
10	Verlaine	2	1	0	1	1	3	−2	3	
11	Waremme	3	1	0	2	5	9	−4	3	
12	Meux	3	0	3	0	4	4	0	3	
13	Rebecq	2	0	2	0	2	2	0	2	
14	Acren-Lessines	2	0	1	1	3	4	−1	1	
15	Warnant	2	0	0	2	2	6	−4	0	
16	Durbuy	3	0	0	3	2	14	−12	0	
17	Virton (Note: On 12 May 2020, Virton were refused both a professional football license and a remunerated football license, meaning they were relegated two levels, directly from the 2019–20 Belgian First Division B to the 2020–21 Belgian Division 2. The club refused to take part in the 2020–21 Belgian Division 2, forfeiting its matches and instead appealing the license decision. While initially seeming to lose the appeal, eventually the Belgian Competition Authority (BMA) ruled on 20 November 2020 that the Belgian FA had violated the competition rules in the license application of Virton. As the competitions had already progressed too far at that point, the BMA asked to reinstate Virton at the second level from the 2021–22 season, while only requiring the club to adhere to the conditions for a remunerated football license for that season, rather than the stricter rules for a professional football license, which is normally the case at this level. Among other things, this would allow the club to also employ players on amateur contracts for their initial season back at the second level. Virton has applied for a license to be allowed to play in the 2021–22 Belgian First Division B and has sued the Belgian FA for 15 million euro in damages. On 12 May 2021, the BAS agreed with the appeal of Virton, not only awarding the license to play in the 2021–22 Belgian First Division B, but also including not to be placed under extreme financial scrutiny for the 2021–22 season.)	0	0	0	0	0	0	0	0	Reinstated to the 2021–22 Belgian First Division B

Source: vbal4
Rules for classification: 1) Points; 2) Matches won; 3) Goal difference; 4) Goals scored; 5) Away matches won; 6) Goal difference in away matches; 7) Away goals scored.

== Number of teams by provinces ==
Number of teams	Province or region	Team(s) in VFV A	Team(s) in VFV B	Team(s) in ACFF
12	East Flanders	Brakel, Dikkelvenne, RC Gent, Lokeren-Temse, Merelbeke, Ninove, Oudenaarde, Petegem, Ronse, Wetteren and Zelzate	Aalst	–
6	Antwerp	none	Berchem, Cappellen, City Pirates, Hoogstraten, Houtvenne and Lyra-Lierse	–
6	Liège	–	–	Hamoir, Solières, Stockay, Verlaine, Waremme and Warnant
5	Limburg	none	Bocholt, Hades, Hasselt, Heur-Tongeren, Spouwen-Mopertingen	–
5	West Flanders	Gullegem, Harelbeke, Menen, Westhoek and Zwevezele	none	–
4	Flemish Brabant	none	Diegem, Londerzeel, Pepingen-Halle and Wijgmaal	–
3	Luxembourg	–	–	Durbuy, Givry and Virton
2	Brussels	none	none	Ganshoren and Jette
2	Hainaut	–	–	Acren Lessines and RAAL La Louvière
2	Namur	–	–	Couvin-Mariembourg and Meux
2	Walloon Brabant	–	–	Rebecq and Tubize
