= Nadir Sbaa =

Belgian footballer

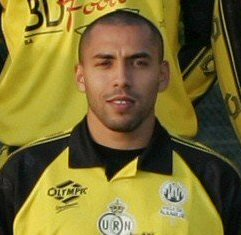

Personal information
- Full name: Nadir Sbaa
- Date of birth: 22 April 1982 (age 44)
- Place of birth: Namur, Belgium
- Position: Forward

Team information
- Current team: UR Namur (Manager)

Youth career
- –1998: UR Namur

Senior career*
| Years | Team | Apps | (Gls) |
| 1998–2000 | UR Namur | 32 | (12) |
| 2000–2001 | Germinal Beerschot | 0 | (0) |
| 2001–2002 | Beveren | 8 | (0) |
| 2003–2006 | Tubize | 115 | (42) |
| 2006 | Ethnikos Asteras | 0 | (0) |
| 2006–2007 | OH Leuven | 14 | (0) |
| 2007–2008 | UR Namur | 38 | (15) |
| 2008–2009 | Ol. Charleroi | 31 | (11) |
| 2010 | Visé | 8 | (3) |
| 2010 | RFC Liège | 8 | (0) |
| 2011 | UR Namur | 8 | (0) |
| 2011–2015 | Meux | | |
| 2015–2016 | RS Châtelet | | |
| 2016–2017 | RES Couvin-Mariembourg | | |

Managerial career
- 2018–2019: RUW Ciney (assistant)
- 2019–: Walhain
- 2025–2026: UR Namur
- * Club domestic league appearances and goals

Nadir Sbaa (born 22 April 1982) is a retired Belgian professional footballer and beach soccer player. He is currently the manager of UR Namur.

== Career ==
Sbaa is a well travelled player, being employed by no less than nine Belgian teams during his career. He also played a very short period with Ethnikos Asteras from Greece. Although mainly playing with clubs in the Belgian Second Division, Sbaa played at the highest level of Belgian football with Beveren during the 2001–2002 season.

== Coaching career ==
In the summer 2018, Sbaa started as assistant manager for Belgian club, RUW Ciney. In September 2019, Sbaa was appointed manager of Walhain. In 2025 he moved to UR Namur.
