= Royal Stade Brainois =

Belgian association football club

Stade Brainois
- Full name: Royal Stade Brainois
- Short name: R.S.B.
- Founded: 1 July 1923; 103 years ago
- Dissolved: 30 June 2021; 5 years ago
- Stadium: Stade du Sans Fond
- Capacity: 2,500
- Final season; 2020-21: season abandoned
Home colours	Away colours

Royal Stade Brainois, often called just Stade Brainois, is a defunct Belgian football club from Braine-le-Comte, Hainaut, Wallonia.

== History ==
The club was founded on 1 July 1923 as Amicale Athlétique Brainoise. Two years later it received the matricule 343, which it kept throughout its history.

On 13 June 1951, the club became a "royal society", and adopted the name Royale Amicale Athlétique Brainoise accordingly.

On the 1 July 1969, a neighboring club, Union Sportive Branoise, founded 7 April 1938, matricule 2607 was merged into the club and became Stade Branois.

The club never reached higher in the league pyramid than the national fourth tier, where they spent the majority of their history. They suffered relegation four times; in 1978–79, 1987–88, 1995–96 and 2001–02.

However they did win the Hainaut Championship three times and reached the 5th round of the national cup in 2018.

In April 2021, Stade Brainois and AFC Tubize announced their intention to merge and the new was to be renamed Royale Union Tubize-Braine. On 1 July 2021, the club was merged into AFC Tubize and ceased to exist along with its matricule.

== Notable players ==
The club is best known as the first club of Eden Hazard, between 1995 and 2003, joining them at the age of 4. During his time at the club, one of his youth coaches described him as a "gifted" player. He added: "He knew everything. I had nothing to teach him".

His brothers Thorgan and Ethan started their careers at the club too.

== Honours and achievements ==
- Hainaut First Division
  - Champions: 1971, 1986, 1993, 1999
- Hainaut Second Division
  - Champions: 2016
- Belgian Cup:
  - 1st Round: 2017–18
  - 2nd Round: 2010-11, 2020–21
  - 5th round: 2018-19
