= 2020–21 Belgian National Division 1 =

Belgian National Division 1
- Season: 2020–21
- Relegated: Roeselare

The 2020–21 Belgian National Division 1 was the fifth season of the third-tier football league in Belgium and the first under its new name after changing from First Amateur Division to National Division 1. Eventually, the season was cancelled in January 2021 with just a few matches played, as measures taken by the Belgian government against the spread of COVID-19 prohibited amateur football.

Just before the season started, Roeselare went bankrupt. Initially, it seemed as though a third-party would be willing to take over the club, with Roeselare forfeiting its first two matches while negotiations continued, eventually however the club folded and the league was to be played with only 15 teams. All results were removed and Roeselare ended in last place.

Due to the COVID-19 pandemic, the league had started later than initially planned, with the first matches played only in September. Mid-October, with only the first four matchdays partially completed, the league was stopped as the second wave of the COVID-19 cases was in full force. With amateur football allowed again as from February 2021, it was decided in early December 2020 to restart the amateur leagues from mid-February 2021, in case the pandemic has evolved positively. Any matches from the first four matchdays which still need to be played can be played already from the beginning of February. In any case, the 2020–21 season was shortened, consisting of only the first half of the season, meaning a single round-robin tournament in which all teams play each other just once. All direct promotion and relegation places were to remain valid, but all post-season playoff tournaments were canceled, with no extra promotion and relegation rounds taking place, which meant that:

- the promotion play-offs, normally between the top four teams, was not to be held and the leading team after the single round-robin tournament was to be promoted directly, providing it also meets the other requirements for promoting into a professional league (e.g. infrastructure, financial, etc.)
- the 13th-place finisher of the Belgian National Division 1 was not required to play a relegation round.

With the planned restarting date coming closer, but COVID-19 figures still high, on 12 January 2021 a first meeting was held between representatives of both the Flemish and Francophone amateur football; the Belgian FA; the union of professional football clubs; and politicians, on whether to cancel the season entirely. The representatives concluded to postpone the decision to 25 January 2021, taking into account the result of the COVID-19 consultation committee of 22 January in which the possibility of relaxing the lockdown measures would be decided. Eventually, the decision was taken to cancel the season entirely. As a result, no teams were promoted or relegated from the league.

== Team information ==
Locations of the 2020–21 Belgian National Division 1 teams

=== Team changes ===
==== In ====
- Roeselare was relegated from the 2019–20 Belgian First Division B.
- Knokke was promoted after winning the 2019–20 Belgian Second Amateur Division A.
- Tienen was promoted after winning the 2019–20 Belgian Second Amateur Division B.
- Francs Borains was promoted after winning the 2019–20 Belgian Second Amateur Division C.
- Mandel United was promoted as best second-place finisher after an extra spot became available due to extra promotions in the 2019–20 Belgian First Amateur Division.

==== Out ====
- Deinze were promoted from the 2019–20 Belgian First Amateur Division as champions.
- RWD Molenbeek, Seraing and Lierse Kempenzonen were all promoted to fill up vacant spots due to the reformation of the league to 18 teams at the highest level and extra relegations due to teams going bankrupt or not obtaining their license.
- Tubize was relegated after they had not obtained a license for not meeting all required criteria.

== Regular season ==
=== League table ===
Pos	Team	Pld	W	D	L	GF	GA	GD	Pts	Qualification or relegation
1	Tessenderlo	3	3	0	0	7	3	+4	9	
2	Tienen	4	2	0	2	5	5	0	6	
3	Heist	2	1	1	0	3	2	+1	4	
4	Sint-Eloois-Winkel	2	1	0	1	4	2	+2	3	
5	Francs Borains	1	1	0	0	2	1	+1	3	
6	Knokke	2	1	0	1	2	1	+1	3	
7	Visé (Note: Mid-April, Visé was refused a Belgian remunerated football license due to use of an incorrect employment contract as its manager José Riga was self-employed rather than signed full-time as per the requirements. Visé appealed the decision with the Belgian Court for Sports Arbitration, adjusting the contract ahead of the new deadline, but also used the appeal to apply for a Belgian professional football license, which would allow the club to play at the second level. The BAS ruled in favor of the club, meaning that in case any vacant places open up at a higher level, Visé would be eligible if manage to adhere to the more stringent requirements, such as extra capacity in the stadium and sufficient luminous intensity in the stadium.)	2	1	0	1	3	3	0	3	
8	Olympic Charleroi CF	2	1	0	1	1	1	0	3	
9	Patro Eisden Maasmechelen (Note: Patro Eisden Maasmechelen announced on 13 April 2021 that it would not be receiving a Belgian remunerated football license, a requirement to play at this level, due to outstanding debts related to social security and taxes. The club added it would appeal the decision with the Belgian Court for Sports Arbitration and believed it would be receiving a license in the end, as in the meantime the necessary funds had been obtained. Eventually the license was indeed granted.)	1	0	1	0	2	2	0	1	
10	RFC Liège	1	0	1	0	0	0	0	1	
11	Rupel Boom	2	0	1	1	0	2	−2	1	
12	Dender EH	0	0	0	0	0	0	0	0	
13	Dessel	0	0	0	0	0	0	0	0	
14	Mandel United	2	0	0	2	1	4	−3	0	
15	La Louvière Centre	2	0	0	2	1	5	−4	0	
16	Roeselare (Note: Roeselare went bankrupt before the season actually started, resulting in the team automatically finishing last. After the season neighbouring club Forza Dadizele, playing at the highest level of the Belgian Provincial Leagues, was renamed SK Roeselare-Daisel, hoping to lure in supporters from the defaulted club to help climb the club up the pyramid.)	0	0	0	0	0	0	0	0	Ceased to exist

Source: Soccerway
Rules for classification: 1) Points; 2) Matches won; 3) Goal difference; 4) Goals scored; 5) Away goals scored; 6) Away matches won.

=== Results ===
Home \ Away	DEN	DES	FRB	HEI	KNO	LAL	MAN	OLC	PEM	RFC	ROE	RUP	SEW	TES	TIE	VIS
Dender EH	—										– (Note: Roeselare went bankrupt and folded as a team. All matches were annulled and the team is ranked last with zero points.)					
Dessel		—									–					
Francs Borains			—								–				2–1	
Heist				—				1–0			–					
Knokke					—						–	2–0				
La Louvière Centre						—					–					1–2
Mandel United							—				–			1–3		
Olympic Charleroi CF					1–0			—			–					
Patro Eisden Maasmechelen				2–2					—		–					
RFC Liège										—	–					
Roeselare	–	–	–	–	–	–	–	–	–	–	—	–	–	–	–	–
Rupel Boom										0–0	–	—				
Sint-Eloois-Winkel						3–0					–		—			
Tessenderlo											–		2–1	—		
Tienen							1–0				–			1–2	—	
Visé											–				1–2	—

Updated to match(es) played on completed. Source: Nationaal : 1st klasse (in Dutch)
Legend: Blue = home team win; Yellow = draw; Red = away team win.

== Number of teams by provinces ==
Number of teams	Province or region	Team(s)
4	West Flanders	Knokke, Mandel United, Roeselare and Sint-Eloois-Winkel
3	Antwerp	Dessel, Heist and Rupel Boom
3	Hainaut	Francs Borains, La Louvière Centre and Olympic Charleroi Châtelet Farciennes
2	Liège	RFC Liège and Visé
2	Limburg	Patro Eisden Maasmechelen and Tessenderlo
1	East Flanders	Dender EH
1	Flemish Brabant	Tienen
