= Lyra-Lierse =

Belgian football club

- Full name: Koninklijke Lyra-Lierse
- Nickname: De Pallieters
- Founded: 13 November 1972; 53 years ago; Stamnummer (matricule number) 52
- Stadium: Sportcentrum Doelvelden Berlaar
- Capacity: 4,500
- Chairman: Yves De Vil
- Head coach: Patrick Van Houdt
- League: Belgian Division 1
- 2024–25: Belgian Division 1 VV, 7th of 16
- Website: lyralierse.be
Home colours	Away colours

Koninklijke Lyra-Lierse (full official name at the Royal Belgian Football Association: K. Lyra-Lierse), formerly known as K. Lyra T.S.V., is a Belgian association football club team from Lier who compete in the Belgian Division 1. That was created in 1972 to continue the former team Koninklijke Lyra that merged in the same year with another team (Koninklijke Lierse Sportkring). The team colours are yellow-black at home and red-white for away games.

== History ==
In 2018, K. Lierse S.K. went bankrupt and negotiations between Lyra and fans of Lierse took place to create a club where the soul and spirit of both Lierse and Lyra would be represented. Also the youth teams of Lierse were integrated into the structure of K. Lyra-Lierse. To highlight this collaboration the name was changed to K. Lyra-Lierse, adding the mandatory "Berlaar" to refer to the place where the matches are currently being played.

The club has a strong community focus and fan-driven culture by having 2 supporters, who are democratically elected, represented on the Board. Next to that, fans of the club have a veto on the club's "identity elements" (such as the name, the colours, the location of the stadium, etc.) and pre-emption rights on shares of the club.

Lyra is the Latin name for Lier.

In 2023–24, Lyra-Lierse secure promotion to Belgian Division 1 from 2024–25 after finishing third place in Belgian Division 2 VV B.

== Results ==
Season	National league					Provincial league	Level	Points	Remarks	Belgian Cup
	I		II	III	IV	PL				Belgian Cup
1987–88						1	Provincial League	Unknown		
1988–89					2		Fourth Division B	41		1/16
1989–90					1		Fourth Division B	43		
1990–91				9			Third Division B	30		1/16
1991–92				16			Third Division B	18		1/32
1992–93					11		Fourth Division B	29		
1993–94					12		Fourth Division B	27		
1994–95					9		Fourth Division B	32		
1995–96					9		Fourth Division B	39	Start of the three points system	3R
1996–97					6		Fourth Division B	45		
1997–98					13		Fourth Division B	30		
1998–99					10		Fourth Division B	41		
1999–2000					1		Fourth Division B	54		2R
2000–01				3			Third Division A	53		3R
2001–02				8			Third Division B	40		5R
2002–03				5			Third Division B	42		3R
2003–04				10			Third Division A	35		4R
2004–05				15			Third Division A	22		3R
2005–06					3		Fourth Division C	56		3R
2006–07					2		Fourth Division C	52		2R
2007–08					7		Fourth Division B	42		5R
2008–09					3		Fourth Division C	49		1R
2009–10					8		Fourth Division B	41		2R
2010–11					5		Fourth Division B	46		5R
2011–12					12		Fourth Division B	33		2R
2012–13					10		Fourth Division C	42		
2013–14					11		Fourth Division C	35		
2014–15					10		Fourth Division C	41		
2015–16					16		Fourth Division C	17		
	1A	1B	1Am	2Am	3Am	PL	From 2016 to 2017, there are 3 national and 3 regional leagues.			
2016–17						4	First Provincial League	51		
2017–18						1	First Provincial League	68		
As Lyra-Lierse Berlaar
2018–19					3		Third Amateur Division B	52		
2019–20					1		Third Amateur Division B	49	Promotion to Second Amateur Division due to COVID-19 Pandemic in Belgium	
2020–21				3			Division 2 VFV B	7	League was officially cancelled due to COVID-19 Pandemic in Belgium	
2021–22				3			Division 2 VFV B	57	Lost promotion play-off VFV	
2022–23				6			Division 2 VV B	55		
2023–24				3			Division 2 VV B	59	Promotion to National Division 1	
2024–25			TBD				National Division 1 VV			

== See also ==
- K. Lyra, a previous (1909–1972) club
- K. Lyra T.S.V., a previous (1972–2018) club
- K. Lierse S.K.
