= KFC Zwarte Leeuw =

Belgian football club

- Full name: KFC Zwarte Leeuw
- Nickname: De Leeuwen
- Founded: April 25, 1926
- Ground: Louis Van Roeystadion
- Capacity: 6,000
- Chairman: Luc Sysmans
- Manager: Gino Swaegers
- League: Belgian First Provincial
Home colours	Away colours

KFC Zwarte Leeuw is a Belgian football club from Rijkevorsel. The club was founded on April 25, 1926, and is affiliated to the Royal Belgian Football Association with base number 1124. The club's club colours are yellow-black. Until the 1974–75 season, Black Lion played in the Provincial Divisions. Since then, with the exception of three seasons in the First Provincial Division, the club has played in the national series, culminating in four seasons in the Second Division, between 1989 and 1994. In the 2023/24 season, the club plays in the Third Division, the third national amateur level.

== History ==
=== Origin of the club (1923–1926) ===
Several football teams emerged in Rijkevorsel during the First World War. However, these teams played irregularly and soon the idea of founding a 'real' football club was considered. So Zwarte Leeuw was founded in 1923, but the club was not yet affiliated to the Belgian Football Federation at that time. The club would initially be called 'de Verenigde Vrienden van d'Akkerhuizen', named after the place of origin of the club's founders, but at the suggestion of first chairman Jeroom Hellings, the name 'Zwarte Leeuw' - translated literally: Black Lion - was chosen. After three years of playing football against other teams in the area, KFC Zwarte Leeuw joined the big Royal Belgian Football Association on April 25, 1926 - its official founding date. The club was then given its current basic number: 1124.

=== The years in the Provincial Divisions (1926–1973) ===
Until the 1972/73 season, the club played in the regional, later renamed Provincial Divisions. Zwarte Leeuw went through all provincial divisions, from the lowest to the highest, before being promoted successively from the Second to the First Provincial Division in 1973 and again from the First Provincial Division to Fourth Division in 1974.

=== The period of success (1973–1990) ===
After promotion in 1973, KFC Zwarte Leeuw played thirteen seasons in the Fourth Division before becoming champions in the 1986/87 season, under the leadership of Roger Kemland, with one point more than Bilzen VV.

In the 1983/84 season, however, there was already a first major success, in the Belgian Cup, by beating first division side Beerschot op het Kiel 0–4 in the 32nd finals, with Lucien Olieslagers as coach. In the 16th finals, the cup adventure then ended for De Leeuwen, after losing 2–1 at Het Lisp, against Lierse.

After the championship in 1987, the club entered the 1987/88 season in the Third Division for the first time in its history. A stunt almost followed in the first season in that league: the club finished second in the ranking, with one point less than Germinal Ekeren. A draw on the last matchday then killed off Zwarte Leeuw.

One season later, however, it was a hit. Led by Eddy Lodewijckx and with Roger Kemland as the club's first manager, De Leeuwen became champions with six points more than the second in the ranking: Heist Sportief. However, the 1988/89 season was marked by much more success, and that was in the Belgian Cup. After the previous big cup success in 1983, Zwarte Leeuw overcame consecutively Berchem Sport, Racing Genk and Antwerp (in two matches) in 1989. In the quarter-finals awaited the club that would become Belgian champions later that season and won the UEFA Cup Winner's Cup a season earlier: KV Mechelen. In the home match, played at Het Lisp in front of some 16,000 spectators, it ended 1-1. In the return match Achter de Kazerne, however, Zwarte Leeuw had to acknowledge its (clear) superiority to the European superpower, it became 5-0 and the cup fairytale of De Leeuwen came to an end.

After a successful 1988/89 season, with promotion and a long cup campaign, Zwarte Leeuw entered the 1989/90 season in the Second Division, the first time for the club. Even in the Second Division, the team from Rijkevorsel continued to amaze. In the first season ever at the second Belgian level, De Leeuwen achieved a third place and played the final round, after Zwarte Leeuw led the standings after ten playing days, winning the first period. In the final round, which would determine whether or not they would advance to the First Division, the club faced Boom, Racing Genk and Lommel. After surviving the group stage and winning the semi-final against Boom (0–1), Zwarte Leeuw lost the final of the final round at home on 31 May 1990 with heavy 2-7 figures to Racing Genk. This day is still the highlight of the club's history until now, never was Zwarte Leeuw closer to the highest division of Belgian football. In the 1989/90 season, the club did win one trophy, the Trofee Jules Pappaert, the cup awarded annually to the club with the longest unbeaten run that calendar year, in the First, Second or Third Division. Zwarte Leeuw won this cup for its run of 27 unbeaten matches in 1989.

Zwarte Leeuw's period of success has one constant: the presidency of the Van Roey family. Father Louis Van Roey and son Frans Van Roey swung the baton at Zwarte Leeuw between 1971 and 1994. All successes in that period were achieved with the family's company on the chest: Bouwbedrijf Van Roey.

=== The toll of success and decline (1990–1996) ===
In the 1990/91 season, the Louis Van Roey stadium was substantially renovated and expanded, with new sitting and standing stands. In both the 1990/91 and 1991/92 seasons, De Leeuwen still played in the Second Division, but the successes of yesteryear were no more. The club paid the price for the sporting heyday of the previous seasons and of the Bosman ruling. That ruling caused the club to see players it acquired leave for free. Much of the club's capital thus went up in smoke.

After three seasons in the Second Division, the inevitable happened, KFC Zwarte Leeuw relegated to the Third Division in the 1991/92 season.

After two seasons in the Third Division, in which relegation was narrowly avoided, the club finished penultimate in the 1995/96 season and dropped back to the Fourth Division after nine seasons. As early as 1994, chairman Frans Van Roey submitted his resignation, the end of the Van Roey era at Zwarte Leeuw. Herman Heylen became interim chairman for two seasons.

=== Stability, promotion and relegation (1996-2012) ===
In 1996, Frans Bevers became the club's new chairman, ushering in a new era for Zwarte Leeuw. The objective was to prevent the free fall, make Zwarte Leeuw financially healthy and stable again and preferably also return to the Third Division. Despite consistently finishing in the top eight in the seasons following the relegation and even playing in the final round for promotion twice in the 1999/00 and 2000/01 seasons, De Leeuwen failed to promote. From the 2002/03 season, however, the club also failed to finish in the left-hand column every year. Zwarte Leeuw did not play a significant role in the Fourth Division from then on, with the exception of the good 2005/06 season. In that season, Zwarte Leeuw finished sixth in the standings, but most importantly: Zwarte Leeuw made it to the 16th finals of the Belgian Cup. After successively defeating Zandvliet, Londerzeel, Lyra, Sint-Gillis-Waas and Sint-Niklaas, the club drew KAA Gent in the 16th finals. In Rijkevorsel, the cup adventure ended with a 0–3 loss against Ghent.

One season after the fine 2005/06 season, however, followed a low point for Zwarte Leeuw: after a 33-year stay in the national series of Belgian football, the club relegated to the First Provincial Division.

In the 2007/08 season, Zwarte Leeuw directly achieved the final round to rise again to the Fourth Division, but in the final promotion had to be left to Wilrijk. In the following 2008/09 season, they again reached the final round and this time did win the final round, against Wijnegem. The return to national football was a fact.

The renewed stay in the national series was relatively short-lived, however, and in the 2011/12 season relegation to the First Provincial Division followed once again.

=== The turnaround, a new momentum (2012–present) ===
The 2012/13 season can be viewed as the season that saw the turnaround towards the current Zwarte Leeuw. After financial troubles (past debts and problems with taxes), Zwarte Leeuw still played champion in the First Provincial Division, with five points more than the second in the ranking, Antonia.

From a new wind within the club, a new president (Willy Fransen became president in 2013), a new vision, a different transfer policy, successes were achieved in the Fourth Division, with fifth, sixth and fourth place in the 2013/14, 2014/15 and 2015/16 seasons consecutively.

That last fourth-place finish ensured that in the 2016/17 season, under the leadership of Gert Jochems, Zwarte Leeuw was classified in the Second Amateur Division after the league reform.

After two seasons, however, Zwarte Leeuw did disappear from that Second Amateur Division after losing the final round in a 2018 match against Pepingen-Halle.

To date, KFC Zwarte Leeuw plays in the Third Amateur Division, renamed the Third Division in 2020. From the 2023/24 season, KFC Zwarte Leeuw will also have a B team in competition, playing in the Fourth Provincial Division.

== Honours ==
League/cup	Number	Season
Third Division	1x	1988/89
Fourth Division	1x	1986/87
First Provincial Division	1x	2012/13
Second Provincial Division	1x	1972/73
Third Provincial Division	2x	1954/55, 1963/64
Trofee Jules Pappaert	1x	1989

== Results ==
Season	Division									Series	Points	Comments	Belgian Cup
	I		II	III		G.I	G.II	G.III		From 1926/27, there are 3 natioanal and 3 regional levels			Belgian Cup
From 1926 as FC Zwarte Leeuw
1931/32								5		Derde gew.	16		
1932/33								4		Derde gew.	13		
1933/34								4		Derde gew.	21		
1934/35								2		Derde gew.	19		
1935/36							8			Tweede gew.	25		
1936/37							8			Tweede gew.	28		
1937/38							3			Tweede gew.	40		
1938/39							5			Tweede gew.	29		
1939/40							1			Noodc.	20	Competition stopped because of World War II	
1940/41							1			Noodc.	38	Competition stopped because of World War II	
1941/42							2			Tweede gew.	41		
1942/43						1				Eerste gew.	35		
1943/44						4				Eerste gew.	28		
1944/45												No competition because of World War II	
1945/46												No competition because of World War II	
1946/47						16				Eerste gew.	8		
1947/48							12			Tweede gew.	22		
1948/49							14			Tweede gew.	12		
1949/50								11		Derde gew.	23		
1950/51								3		Derde gew.	38		
1951/52								3		Derde gew.	44		
	I		II	III	IV	P.I	P.II	P.III	P.IV	From 1952/53, there are 4 national and 4 regional levels			
1952/53								11		Derde prov. Antw.	21		
1952/53								11		Derde prov. Antw.	21		
1953/54								3		Derde prov. Antw.	35		
1954/55								1		Derde prov. Antw.	42		
1955/56							7			Tweede prov. Antw.	32		
1956/57							13			Tweede prov. Antw.	21		
1957/58							6			Tweede prov. Antw.	32		
1958/59							13			Tweede prov. Antw.	24		
1959/60							15			Tweede prov. Antw.	12		
1960/61								4		Derde prov. Antw.	41		
1961/62								4		Derde prov. Antw.	39		
1962/63								3		Derde prov. Antw.	43		
1963/64								1		Derde prov. Antw.	46		
1964/65							3			Tweede prov. Antw.	38		
1965/66							3			Tweede prov. Antw.	39		
1966/67							11			Tweede prov. Antw.	28		
1967/68							8			Tweede prov. Antw.	31		
1968/69							13			Tweede prov. Antw.	27		
1969/70							2			Tweede prov. Antw.	45		
1970/71							2			Tweede prov. Antw.	45		
1971/72							6			Tweede prov. Antw.	33		
1972/73							1			Tweede prov. Antw.	39		
1973/74						2				Eerste prov. Antw.	40		
1974/75					6					Vierde klasse B	32		
1975/76					3					Vierde klasse C	37		
From 1976 as KFC Zwarte Leeuw
1976/77					3					Vierde klasse B	35		
1977/78					2					Vierde klasse B	41		
1978/79					7					Vierde klasse A	31		
1979/80					3					Vierde klasse C	44		
1980/81					2					Vierde klasse A	41		
1981/82					2					Vierde klasse C	45		
1982/83					2					Vierde klasse D	48		
1983/84					2					Vierde klasse B	50		1/8
1984/85					5					Vierde klasse C	37		
1985/86					5					Vierde klasse A	32		
1986/87					1					Vierde klasse C	41		
1987/88				2						Derde klasse B	50		
1988/89				1						Derde klasse B	44		1/4
1989/90			3							Tweede klasse	36		1/32
1990/91			14							Tweede klasse	26		1/8
1991/92			13							Tweede klasse	24		1/32
1992/93			16							Tweede klasse	23		
1993/94				14						Derde klasse B	24		
1994/95				14						Derde klasse B	23		
1995/96				15						Derde klasse B	22	Introduction three point system	4R
1996/97					7					Vierde klasse C	41		
1997/98					5					Vierde klasse C	50		
1998/99					3					Vierde klasse B	49		
1999/00					2					Vierde klasse C	54		3R
2000/01					2					Vierde klasse C	48		4R
2001/02					6					Vierde klasse C	45		4R
2002/03					10					Vierde klasse C	45		3R
2003/04					11					Vierde klasse C	35		4R
2004/05					11					Vierde klasse B	36		4R
2005/06					6					Vierde klasse C	48		1/16
2006/07					14					Vierde klasse C	33		3R
2007/08						5				Eerste prov. Antw.	45		2R
2008/09						2				Eerste prov. Antw.	72		1R
2009/10					7					Vierde klasse C	43		1R
2010/11					12					Vierde klasse C	38		2R
2011/12					14					Vierde klasse C	27		2R
2012/13						1				Eerste prov. Antw.	61		2R
2013/14					5					Vierde klasse C	48		4R
2014/15					6					Vierde klasse C	44		4R
2015/16					4					Vierde klasse C	50		4R
	1A	1B	1Am	2Am	3Am	P.I	P.II	P.III	P.IV	From 2016/17, there are 3 national and 4 regional amateur divisions			
2016/17				7						Tweede klasse Am.	40		5R
2017/18				14						Tweede klasse Am.	30		3R
2018/19					6					Derde klasse Am.	43		3R
2019/20					10					Derde klasse Am.	31	Competition stopped after 24 games because of COVID-19	2R
2020/21					11					Derde afdeling	4	Competition stopped after 3 games because of COVID-19	3R
2021/22					7					Derde afdeling	46		5R
2022/23										Derde afdeling			
