= Olsa Brakel =

Association football club in Brakel, Belgium

- Full name: Koninklijke Oud Leerlingenverbond Sint-Augustinus Brakel
- Short name: Olsa
- Founded: 1952; 73 years ago
- Ground: Stephan Van den Berghe Stadium, Brakel
- Chairman: Stephan Van den Berghe
- Head coach: Stefano Nijst
- League: Belgian Division 2
- Website: https://www.olsabrakel.be/
Home colours

Olsa Brakel is a Belgian football club based in the town of Brakel, registered with the Belgian FA under matricule 5553. The full name of the club is Koninklijke Oud Leerlingenverbond Sint-Augustinus Brakel and it has yellow and black as club colours. Both the men's and women's team play at the national level of Belgian football.

== History ==
The club from Nederbrakel join the Belgian FA in 1952 under the name of Oud Leerlingenverbond Sint-Augustinus Nederbrakel (short:Olsa Nederbrakel), starting in the Belgian Provincial Leagues and receiving matricule number 5553. In 1975, the name was officially abbreviated to Olsa Brakel.

Olsa Brakel remained in the Provincial Leagues for four decades, until in 1990 it reached the national level for the first time, easily maintaining itself in the Belgian Fourth Division. The following season the club even finished second, its best result ever, before starting a decline again, eventually relegating back to the Provincial level in 1997. After another decade there, the club returned to the fourth division in 2007 and was able to promote to the Belgian Third Division in 2010 after finishing third and with several clubs at higher levels defaulting or merging, causing extra clubs to be promoted. With the Belgian football reform of 2016, the Belgian Third Division was rebranded to Belgian Second Amateur Division but dropped one level in the Belgian football pyramid, moving the club back to level 4, the current level it is playing at.

In the Belgian Cup, Olsa Brakel booked its biggest success in 2014–15, when it beat Belgian First Division A team Westerlo 6–1 at home to reach the round of 16, where it lost out to KV Mechelen. In 2020–21 they reached the same round, losing 6–1 away to league champions Club Brugge.

== Honours ==
- Belgian Cup:
  - Round of 16 (2): 2014–15, 2020–21
