= Belgian Division 3 =

- Founded: 2016; 10 years ago
- Country: Belgium
- Confederation: UEFA
- Number of clubs: 65 (4 leagues : 16+16+17+16)
- Level on pyramid: 5
- Promotion to: Belgian Division 2
- Relegation to: Belgian Provincial Leagues
- Domestic cup: Belgian Cup
- Current champions: Tempo Overijse (VV A); De Kempen (VV B); Stade Mouscronnois (ACFF A); Eupen U23 (ACFF B) (2025–26)
- Current: 2026–27 Belgian Division 3

The Belgian Division 3, commonly referred to as simply Derde Afdeling (in Dutch) or Division 3 (in French) is the fifth-highest division in the Belgian football league system, one level below the Belgian Division 2. It was created by the Royal Belgian Football Association in 2016 as a new layer at the fifth level of the league system, at that time named Belgian Third Amateur Division. From the 2020–21 season on it was renamed to Belgian Division 3, due to the negative connotation of the word amateur. The division consists of four separate leagues with 16 teams each, two of these leagues consist of teams playing with a license from the Voetbalfederatie Vlaanderen (VFV, the Dutch-speaking wing of the RBFA) and two with teams with a license from the Association des Clubs Francophones de Football (ACFF, the French-speaking wing of the RBFA).

== History ==
The Belgian Third Amateur Division was created in 2016 following an overhaul of the Belgian football league system which saw the number of professional clubs reduced to 24. As a result, from the third level and below only amateur clubs remain. The two remaining levels above the Belgian Provincial leagues were reformed into three amateur levels, namely the Belgian Second Amateur Division (reformed Belgian Third Division), the Belgian Third Amateur Division (reformed Belgian Fourth Division) and the newly created Belgian First Amateur Division. As a result, the Belgian Provincial leagues dropped to the sixth level of the league system.

In 2020, the levels three to five were renamed to Belgian National Division 1, Belgian Division 2 and Belgian Division 3 respectively.

== Competition format ==
In each of the four separate leagues, the season is a regular round-robin tournament with 16 teams. The winners of each league is promoted to the Belgian Division 2. The teams finishing in second place in each Flemish-speaking league and the three period winners (the season is divided into three periods) of these leagues will playoff for two extra promotion spots. No extra promotion places are available for the French-speaking leagues as there is only one French-speaking league at the Belgian Division 2, compared to two Flemish-speaking ones. Regarding relegation, the bottom three teams from each league are relegated to the Belgian Provincial leagues, but the number of teams to be relegated can increase depending on the number of teams being relegated directly from the Belgian Second Amateur Division.

== Past winners ==
Season	VV A winner	VV B winner	ACFF A winner	ACFF B winner	Promotion play-off VV winners	Promotion play-off ACFF winners
2016–17	Ingelmunster	Turnhout	RWDM47	Durbuy	Ronse, City Pirates, Vosselaar, Sint-Lenaarts, Pepingen	Rebecq
2017–18	Menen	Heur-Tongeren	La Louvière	Tilleur	Diegem, Dikkelvenne, Eppegem	Couvin-Mariembourg, Francs Borains, Visé
2018–19	Merelbeke	Tienen	Namur Fosses	Stockay-Warfusee	Pepingen-Halle, Zwevezele	Givry, Onhaye, Verlaine
2019–20	Zelzate	Lyra-Lierse Berlaar	Ganshoren	Warnant	not held due to coronavirus pandemic, extra promotions went to Ninove, Brakel, Wetteren, City Pirates, Heur-Tongeren, Houtvenne, Jette	
2020–21	season cancelled due to the coronavirus pandemic					
2021–22	Oostkamp	Racing Mechelen	Namur FLV	Dison	Erpe-Mere United, Lebbeke, Turnhout, Lille, Torhout	Binche
2022–23	Overijse	Wezel	Mons	Rochefort	Voorde-Appelterre, Houtvenne	Tournai, La Calamine
2023–24	Westhoek	Termien	Onhaye	Hutoise	Berg en Dal, Pelt, Roeselare, Wellen	Crossing Schaerbeek, Manageoise, Raeren-Eynatten, Habay-la-Neuve, Aywaille, Ostiches-Ath (Note: While not taking part in the ACFF promotion play-offs, Seraing II was also promoted to increase the number of U23 teams in the Belgian Division 2.)
2024–25	Mandel United	Londerzeel	Braine	Richelle United	Diksmuide-Oostende, Hamme, Kalken, Nijlen, Wetteren	Flénu, Tilff, Sporting Bruxelles
2025–26	Tempo Overijse	De Kempen	Stade Mouscronnois	Eupen U23	Wilrijk, Eendracht Aalst Lede, Voorde-Appelterre	Union Saint-Ghislain Tertre-Hautrage
2026–27						
