= KFC Diest =

Belgian football club

- Full name: Koninklijke Football Club Diest
- Founded: 1909
- Dissolved: 2025
- Ground: Stedelijk Sportstadion De Warande
- Capacity: 8,000
- Chairman: Johan Haesevoets
- Manager: Danny Boffin
- League: Belgian Provincial Leagues
- Website: 41kfc-diest.be

Koninklijke Football Club Diest is a former Belgian association football club from the town of Diest, Flemish Brabant. It played two spells in the first division: from 1961–62 to 1964–65 and from 1970–71 to 1974–75, finishing 7th in 1964.

== History ==
The club was founded in 1909 as Hooger Op Diest Football Club and registered to the Belgian Football Association the same year to receive the matricule n°41, playing in black and white. In 1948 it merged with Standaard Athletiek Diest (matricule n°231) to become F.C. Diest. Seven years later it added Koninklijke (meaning royal) to its name to become K.F.C. Diest.

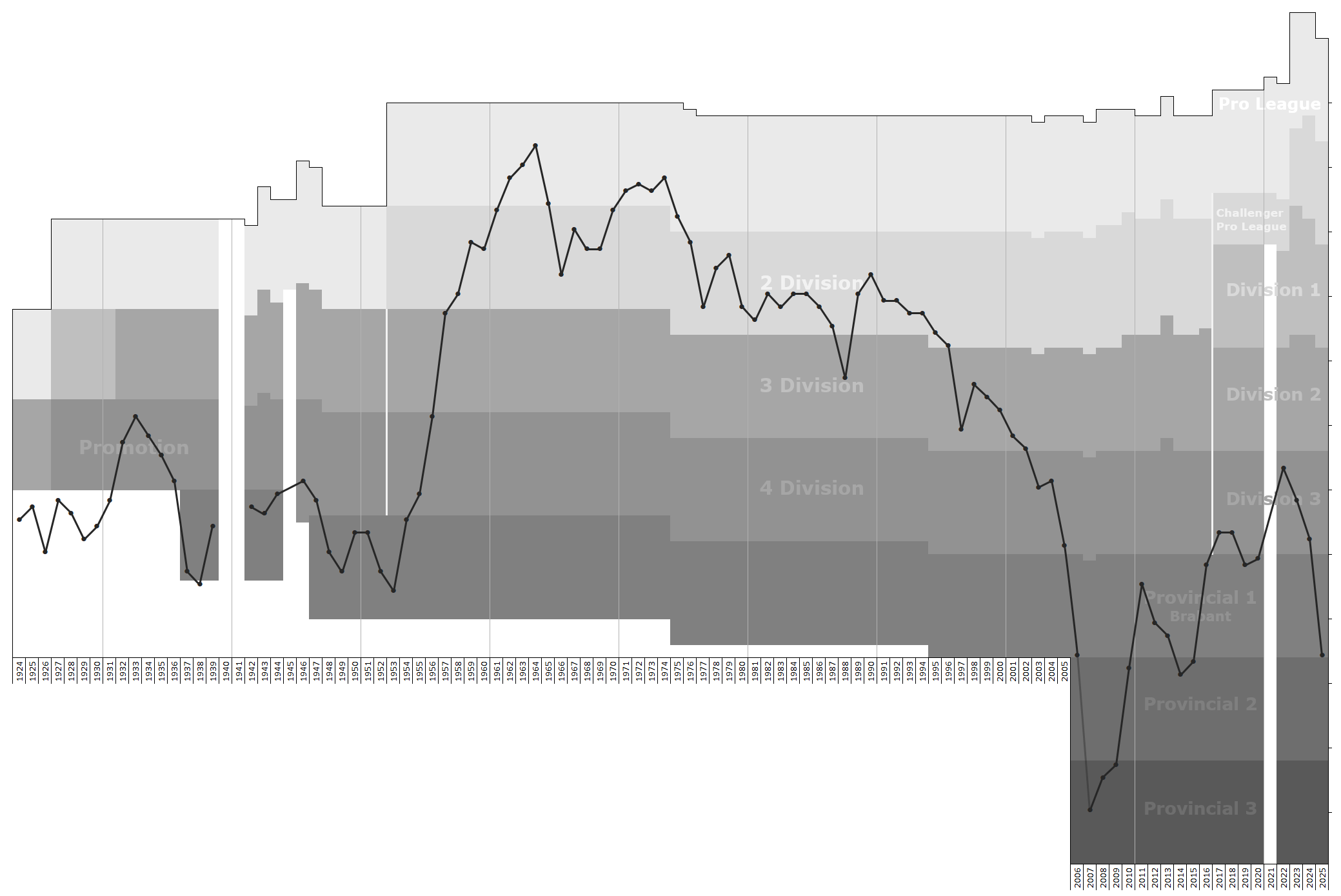
Historical chart of Diest league performance

The club first reached the second division in 1957. It won this competition in 1961 and subsequently played at the highest level for the following years. In 1965, it was back at the second level and it won the competition again in 1970. In 1987–88, it played in the third division but returned to the second division due to a merger with F.C. Assent (at that time in second division) to become K. Tesamen Hogerop Diest, known as KTH Diest, now adding red to its colours. The club gradually dropped levels again, to the third division in 1996, fourth division in 2002 and into the Belgian Provincial Leagues in 2005. In 2006, with the club in last place at the 5th level and in severe financial difficulties, it went bankrupt and dropped two levels at once down to level seven. At that point the club changed its name back to K.F.C. Diest and reverted to the original colors of black and white. In 2009, the club promoted again, undefeated even, followed by another promotion in 2010 to again reach the highest level of provincial football. In 2016, the club promoted for the first time into the national leagues again, where it is currently residing in the Belgian Third Amateur Division (fifth level).

== Notable players ==
- Timmy Simons
