= Royal Wallonia Walhain =

Belgian football club

Walhain
- Full name: Royal Wallonia Walhain Chaumont-Gistoux
- Founded: 1941
- Ground: Stade du Boscailles
- Capacity: 1,600
- Chairman: Frédéric Davister
- Coach: Nadir Sbaa
- League: Belgian Third Amateur Division
- 2018–19: Belgian Second Amateurs C, 14th (relegated)

Royal Wallonia Walhain Chaumont-Gistoux is a Belgian association football club located in the municipality of Walhain, Walloon Brabant. They have played in the third division since 1997–98. However, in 2006–07, the club could not avoid relegation to the 4th level of Belgian football, i.e. the Promotion.

The club was founded in 1941, and currently plays at Stade du Boscailles.
