= Sportkring Sint-Niklaas =

Belgian football club

- Full name: Sportkring Sint-Niklaas
- Founded: 1993; 33 years ago
- Ground: Stedelijk Sportcentrum Meesterstraat, Sint-Niklaas
- Capacity: 3,000
- League: Provincial Division 4 East Flanders
- 2024–25: Provincial Division 3 East Flanders, 15th (relegated)
Home colours	Away colours

Sportkring Sint-Niklaas (formerly known as FCN Sint-Niklaas) is a Belgian football club from Sint-Niklaas, currently playing in the Belgian Fourth Division.

== History ==
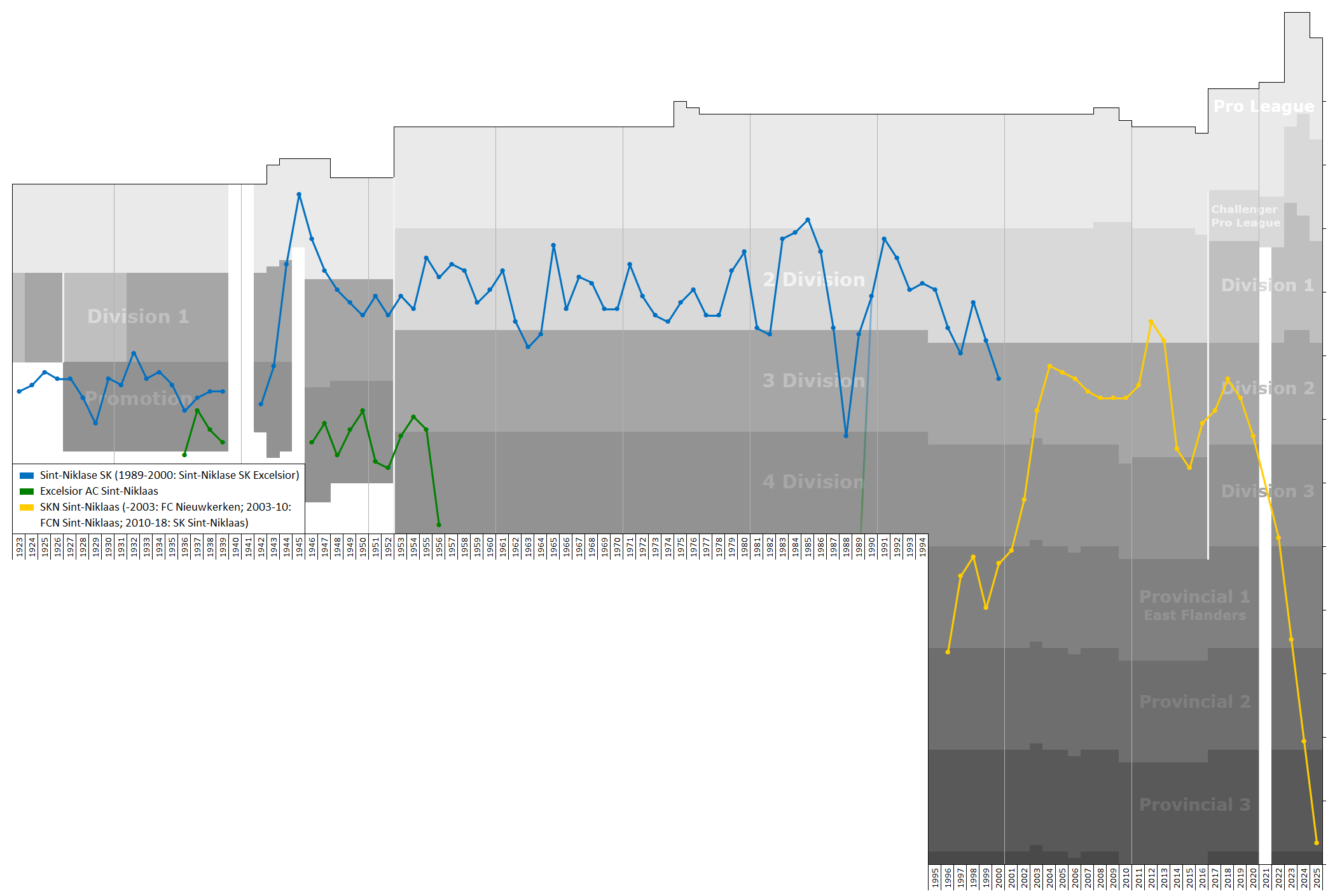
Historical chart of SK Sint-Niklaas league performance

The club was founded in 1993 as Football Club Nieuwkerken, and played in the Provincial league system of East Flanders until 2001, when the club achieved promotion to the national Fourth Division for the first time. In 2010, the club was renamed SK Sint-Niklaas and changed its colors to yellow-blue, in an effort to claim the legacy of Sint-Niklase SK, another local club that was dissolved in 2000.

In 2011, the club won the Third Division playoff to reach the Second Division, where it played for two seasons. Since 2020, SKN Sint-Niklaas has suffered five consecutive relegations (not counting season 2020/21, cancelled due to the Covid-19 pandemic), from Division 2 to Provincial Division 4.
