= Belgian Provincial Leagues =

- Founded: 1904; 122 years ago
- Country: Belgium
- Confederation: UEFA
- Level on pyramid: 6 through 9
- Promotion to: Belgian Division 3
- Domestic cup: Belgian Cup
- Current: 2025–26

The Belgian Provincial leagues are the lower leagues for Belgian football. Until 2016, these were at levels 5-8 in the Belgian football league system however as part of the reform an extra level was created causing the provincial leagues to drop to levels 6-9. The provincial leagues are divided into 9 regional league systems (one for each province, but Flemish Brabant and Walloon Brabant are merged and contain also the football teams from the Brussels Capital Region). Each league system is itself divided into 4 levels (except for Luxembourg where there are only 3). The number of leagues at each level depends on the province, but every province must have only one league at the top level. The best teams from the 9 first divisions can promote to the Belgian Division 3, the fifth and lowest level in the national leagues (either directly, or after playoff matches).

== The first provincial divisions ==
Each of the provinces in Belgium has their own league structure within the provincial leagues, with the exception of Flemish Brabant and Walloon Brabant which are still playing together in the Brabant division. The Province of Brabant was split into Flemish Brabant, Walloon Brabant and the Brussels Capital Region from 1 January 1995 as part of the 1993 state reform, however the provincial football league of Brabant still exists as such and contains these two provinces and teams from Brussels.

As such, there are nine leagues at the first level of the provincial leagues, namely the leagues of the provinces of Antwerp, East Flanders, Hainaut, Liège, Limburg, Luxembourg, Namur, West Flanders and finally the Brabant division containing teams from the Brussels Capital Region, Flemish Brabant and Walloon Brabant.

=== The regular season ===
Since 2006, each division is composed of 16 clubs. The regular season is thus composed of 30 matchdays, generally played on Sunday. The nine league winners of the regular season qualify for the Belgian Division 3 (until 2020 the Third Amateur Division and until 2015 the Belgian Fourth Division), as well as the second placed teams of the three most active provinces of the previous season, i.e. the provinces that count the most active teams in the national and provincial leagues. Those twelve clubs replace the last three teams of each league of Division 3. The six other second placed teams enter the promotion playoff on the second matchday.

As each team relegated from the Belgian Division 3 must play the next season in a specific provincial league based on its location, the number of newcomers in each provincial league may be different. Therefore, there may then be more relegated teams than usual from some first provincial divisions to the respective second provincial divisions, to allow the total number of teams in each division to remain constant. Each provincial general assembly can decide to organise its own relegation playoff including teams from the first and the second divisions but there must be at least two teams directly relegated to the second provincial division.

=== The promotion playoff ===
The promotion playoff is played over three matchdays. The first one is composed of two matches played by the four thirteenth placed teams of each league in Division 3. The host team is the first to be drawn. The two losing teams enter the second matchday whereas the two winners remain in Division 3. Four matches are played in the second matchday, between the six second placed teams of the provincial first divisions that did not qualify directly and the two Division 3 teams that lost in the previous round. The four matches are grouped by two, and each of the Division 3 teams play a match in a different group. The two winners of each group play a group final in the third matchday to decide the last two teams to promote.

== The second provincial divisions ==
The number of leagues at the second provincial division level differs from province to province, most have three but some only have two. Each league is played between 16 teams. The system of promotion and relegation is set up by the annual provincial assembly.

== The third provincial divisions ==
At the third provincial level, the amount of leagues differs even more, ranging from three to six. Also from this level on the leagues sometimes have fewer teams than the standard 16. Again, the system of promotion and relegation is set up by the annual provincial assembly.

== The fourth provincial divisions ==
In most provinces the fourth provincial level is the lowest level of football, except for Luxembourg where the lowest level is the third one. At this level the system of promotion is set up by the annual provincial assembly as well.

== See also ==
- Belgian Division 3
- Belgian football league system
