= 2016–17 Belgian First Division B =

First season of the Belgian First Division B

Belgian First Division B
- Season: 2016–17
- Champions: Antwerp
- Promoted: Antwerp
- Relegated: Lommel United

The 2016–17 season of the Belgian First Division B began in August 2016 and ended on 28 April 2017. It was the inaugural season of the First Division B following a change in league format from the old Belgian Second Division. The fixtures were announced on 23 June 2016.

Although scoring most points overall, Lierse missed out on promotion as they came second in both the opening and closing tournament, leaving K.S.V. Roeselare and Antwerp to battle it out for promotion. Following thirteen years at the second level of Belgian football, Antwerp secured promotion on 11 March 2017. At the bottom end of the table, Lommel United suffered relegation as they could not overcome their deficit from the regular season during the relegation playoff.

== Structural changes ==
This season is the first under the name First Division B as a result of reforms in the Belgian football league system. The format of the league has been completely overhauled, with the season now consisting of two separate tournaments. The first tournament will be held from August to December, the second from January until April. The two tournament winners will play a two legged playoff to determine who is promoted to the 2017–18 Belgian First Division A. If a team wins both tournaments, it automatically clinches promotion. The top three teams in the aggregate table besides the promoted team will take part in the Europa League playoffs together with the teams in the 2016–17 Belgian First Division A finishing in positions 7 through 15. The remaining four teams will play a relegation playoff to determine the one team that will drop into the 2017–18 Belgian First Amateur Division.

== Team changes ==
Due to the reformation, only 7 teams of the previous season remained in the league, with 1 other being replaced. As a result, the league moved from 17 to 8 teams.

=== Out ===
- Due to the fact that 2015–16 Belgian Second Division champions WS Brussels were refused a Belgian professional football license, Eupen was promoted as runner-up instead, while WS Brussels was relegated to the 2016–17 Belgian First Amateur Division.
- All teams finishing below 9th place were also relegated into the 2016–17 Belgian First Amateur Division, which (starting from 10th place) included Dessel Sport, Seraing United, Virton, ASV Geel, Deinze, Patro Eisden Maasmechelen, Heist and Coxyde.

=== In ===
- OH Leuven were relegated from the Belgian Pro League after finishing in last place.

== Team information ==
=== Stadiums and locations ===
Locations of the 2016–17 Belgian First Division B teams

Matricule	Club	City	First season of current spell at second level	Coming from	2015–16 result	Stadium	Capacity
1	Royal Antwerp F.C.	Antwerp	2004–05	Belgian Pro League	3rd (D2)	Bosuilstadion	16,649
12	Cercle Brugge K.S.V.	Bruges	2015–16	Belgian Pro League	5th (D2)	Jan Breydel Stadium	29,945
6142	Oud-Heverlee Leuven	Leuven	2016–17	Belgian Pro League	16th (D1)	Den Dreef	10,000
30	Lierse S.K.	Lier	2015–16	Belgian Pro League	7th (D2)	Herman Vanderpoortenstadion	14,538
2554	Lommel United	Lommel	2005–06	Belgian Third Division	8th (D2)	Soevereinstadion	12,500
134	K.S.V. Roeselare	Roeselare	2010–11	Belgian Pro League	9th (D2)	Schiervelde Stadion	9,075
5632	A.F.C. Tubize	Tubize	2009–10	Belgian Pro League	4th (D2)	Stade Leburton	9,000
10	R. Union Saint-Gilloise	Saint-Gilles, Brussels	2015–16	Belgian Third Division	6th (D2)	King Baudouin Stadium (Note: As part of the reform the rules for obtaining a licence were changed, with clubs now required to have a stadium with a capacity of at least 8,000. As the Stade Joseph Marien has only a capacity of six thousand, Union will play one season in the King Baudouin Stadium while their home stadium is being expanded.)	50,122

=== Personnel and kits ===
Club	Manager	Captain	Kit Manufacturer	Sponsors
Antwerp	(Belgium) Frederik Vanderbiest		Kappa	ONE Antwerp
Cercle Brugge	(Belgium) Vincent Euvrard		Acerbis	ADMB
OH Leuven	(Belgium) Emilio Ferrera		Vermarc	Just Eat
Lierse	(Belgium) Eric Van Meir		Jako	Wadi Degla
Lommel United	(Belgium) Karel Fraeye		Legea	Belien Auto; Derdaele+
Roeselare	(France) Arnauld Mercier		Joma	Euro Shop
Tubize	(France) Thierry Goudet		Kappa	No sponsor
Union SG	(Belgium) Marc Grosjean		Patrick	Culture et Formation

=== Managerial changes ===
Team	Outgoing manager	Manner of departure	Date of vacancy	Position	Replaced by	Date of appointment
Antwerp	(Belgium) David Gevaert	Sacked	End of 2015–16 season	Pre-season	(Belgium) Frederik Vanderbiest	19 May 2016
Cercle Brugge	(Belgium) Frederik Vanderbiest	Mutual Consent	18 May 2016	Pre-season	(Belgium) Vincent Euvrard	25 May 2016
Roeselare	(Belgium) Franky Van der Elst	Mutual Consent	18 May 2016	Pre-season	(France) Arnauld Mercier	25 May 2016
Tubize	(France) Colbert Marlot	Mutual Consent	8 June 2016	Pre-season	(France) Thierry Goudet	8 June 2016
Tubize	(France) Thierry Goudet	Sacked	17 August 2016	8th	(France) Régis Brouard	28 August 2016
Lommel United	(Belgium) Karel Fraeye	Sacked	8 October 2016	8th	(Belgium) Walter Meeuws	20 October 2016
Antwerp	(Belgium) Frederik Vanderbiest	Sacked	11 October 2016	4th	(Belgium) David Gevaert	15 October 2016
Cercle Brugge	(Belgium) Vincent Euvrard	Sacked	29 October 2016	7th	(Belgium) José Riga	1 November 2016
Antwerp	(Belgium) David Gevaert	Resigned	10 November 2016	3rd	(Belgium) Wim De Decker	17 November 2016
Lommel United	(Belgium) Walter Meeuws	Sacked	23 November 2016	Closing tournament: 6th Overall: 8th	(Belgium) Tom Van Imschoot	23 November 2016
OH Leuven	(Belgium) Emilio Ferrera	Sacked	15 January 2017	Closing tournament: 6th Overall: 5th	(Netherlands) Dennis van Wijk	19 January 2017
Lierse	(Belgium) Eric Van Meir	Sacked	15 March 2017	Closing tournament: 2nd Overall: 1st	(Belgium) Frederik Vanderbiest	17 March 2017
Tubize	(France) Régis Brouard	Sacked	21 April 2017	Relegation play-offs: 2nd	(Senegal) Sadio Demba	3 May 2017

== League table ==
=== Opening tournament ===
Pos	Team	Pld	W	D	L	GF	GA	GD	Pts	Qualification	ROE	LIE	ANT	USG	TUB	OHL	LOM	CER
1	Roeselare	14	9	3	2	24	15	+9	30	Qualification to Promotion play-offs	—	2–2	2–1	2–1	1–0	2–2	2–0	2–1
2	Lierse	14	8	4	2	26	14	+12	28		0–2	—	2–0	2–1	5–1	2–2	0–2	2–0
3	Antwerp	14	5	5	4	19	15	+4	20		1–0	1–2	—	4–0	2–0	2–1	0–1	2–1
4	Union SG	14	5	3	6	22	22	0	18		1–2	2–2	1–1	—	0–1	2–0	3–1	3–2
5	Tubize	14	5	2	7	23	29	−6	17		4–1	1–3	2–2	2–2	—	0–1	0–4	4–1
6	OH Leuven	14	3	6	5	18	21	−3	15		1–1	0–1	1–1	0–3	0–1	—	2–2	2–0
7	Lommel United	14	3	4	7	20	27	−7	13		1–2	0–3	1–1	1–2	3–6	2–2	—	1–1
8	Cercle Brugge	14	3	3	8	18	27	−9	12		0–3	0–0	1–1	2–1	4–1	2–4	3–1	—

Source: Belgian First Division B (in French and Dutch)
Rules for classification: 1) Points; 2) Matches won; 3) Goal difference; 4) Goals scored; 5) Away goals scored; 6) Away matches won; 7) Play-off.

=== Closing tournament ===
Pos	Team	Pld	W	D	L	GF	GA	GD	Pts	Qualification	ANT	LIE	CER	ROE	TUB	USG	OHL	LOM
1	Antwerp	14	8	5	1	21	11	+10	29	Qualification to Promotion play-offs	—	0–2	0–0	1–0	1–1	2–0	2–0	1–0
2	Lierse	14	7	6	1	25	11	+14	27		2–2	—	1–1	1–1	3–0	1–0	1–1	5–1
3	Cercle Brugge	14	6	3	5	14	13	+1	21		0–1	0–1	—	2–2	2–1	0–1	1–0	1–0
4	Roeselare	14	5	5	4	18	17	+1	20		1–2	2–1	3–1	—	1–1	0–1	2–1	2–1
5	Tubize	14	5	2	7	19	24	−5	17		2–4	0–3	1–3	3–1	—	3–0	0–2	2–0
6	Union SG	14	4	5	5	11	12	−1	17		1–1	0–0	1–2	0–0	2–0	—	4–0	1–1
7	OH Leuven	14	4	3	7	15	21	−6	15		0–0	2–3	1–0	1–2	1–3	2–0	—	2–1
8	Lommel United	14	0	5	9	11	25	−14	5		2–4	1–1	0–1	1–1	1–2	0–0	2–2	—

Rules for classification: 1) Points; 2) Matches won; 3) Goal difference; 4) Goals scored; 5) Away goals scored; 6) Away matches won; 7) Play-off.

=== Aggregate table ===
Pos	Team	Pld	W	D	L	GF	GA	GD	Pts	Qualification
1	Lierse	28	15	10	3	51	25	+26	55	Qualification to Europa League play-offs
2	Roeselare	28	14	8	6	42	32	+10	50	Qualification to Promotion play-offs (Note: The team that promoted to the 2017–18 Belgian First Division A, by winning the Promotion playoff, did not take part in the Europa League play-offs. The next team in the aggregate league table took its spot.)
3	Antwerp	28	13	10	5	40	26	+14	49	Qualification to Promotion play-offs
4	Union SG	28	9	8	11	33	34	−1	35	Qualification to Europa League play-offs
5	Tubize	28	10	4	14	42	53	−11	34	Qualification to Relegation play-offs (Note: In case the team that wins the Promotion playoff finishes in the bottom four, the 4th placed team will play the relegation playoff instead.)
6	Cercle Brugge	28	9	6	13	32	40	−8	33	Qualification to Relegation play-offs
7	OH Leuven	28	7	9	12	33	42	−9	30	Qualification to Relegation play-offs
8	Lommel United	28	3	9	16	31	52	−21	18	Qualification to Relegation play-offs

Source: Belgian First Division B (in French and Dutch)
Rules for classification: 1) Points; 2) Matches won; 3) Goal difference; 4) Goals scored; 5) Away goals scored; 6) Away matches won; 7) Play-off.

=== Promotion play-offs ===
The winners of the opening tournament and the closing tournament meet in a two-legged match to determine the division champion, who will promote to the 2017–18 Belgian First Division A. The team finishing highest in the aggregate table will play the second leg at home. In case one team wins both the opening and the closing tournament, these matches will not be played and the team is promoted automatically.

On 6 November 2016, Roeselare won the opening tournament and was therefore assured of playing at least the promotion play-offs. Following a loss against Antwerp on the penultimate day of the closing tournament, Roeselare could no longer win the closing tournament (and direct promotion) and as a result the promotion play-offs would be held. On the final day of the closing tournament, Roeselare then held Lierse to a draw, denying them the play-offs and setting Roeselare up with Antwerp to decide promotion. Antwerp twice beat Roeselare and thereby allowed the club to return to the highest level of professional football in Belgium following thirteen seasons at the second level. Initially, they did not receive a license to compete in professional football the following season, but the decision was overturned. Roeselare got to play the Europa League play-offs.

5 March 2017
14:30

Antwerp	3–1	Roeselare
Dequevy 35'; Damman 57' (o.g.); Hairemans 73' (pen.)	Report	Schmisser 64'

Bosuilstadion, Antwerp
Referee: Ken Vermeiren

11 March 2017
20:00

Roeselare	1–2	Antwerp
Schmisser 35'	Report	Dierckx 30'; Limbombe 78'

Schiervelde Stadion, Roeselare
Referee: Erik Lambrechts

Antwerp won 5–2 on aggregate.

=== Relegation play-offs ===
The four bottom teams in the aggregate table will take part in the relegation play-offs in which they keep half of the points they collected during the overall regular season (rounded up). As a result, the teams started with the following points before the playoff: Tubize 17 points, Cercle Brugge 17, OH Leuven 15 and Lommel United 9. The points of Cercle Brugge were rounded up, therefore in case of any ties on points at the end of the playoffs, their half point would be deducted. The team finishing in last position relegated to the 2017–18 Belgian First Amateur Division.

Despite starting with a huge deficit, Lommel United managed to close the gap between them and the other teams by obtaining 10 points out of their first four matches, overtaking Cercle Brugge and virtually being saved from relegation. At that point, neither team was saved as OH Leuven and Tubize had 20 points and Cercle Brugge and Lommel United were only one point behind. On matchday five, Lommel United first lost against Cercle Brugge and one day later on 22 April 2017, Tubize beat OH Leuven resulting in both Tubize and Cercle Brugge to be saved. On 28 April 2017, the final match, OH Leuven and Lommel United played each other in a direct confrontation to avoid relegation, with OH Leuven needing only a draw. The match ended 1–0 resulting in the relegation of Lommel United.

Pos	Team	Pld	W	D	L	GF	GA	GD	Pts	Qualification	TUB	OHL	CER	LOM
1	Tubize	6	1	4	1	6	6	0	24		—	1–0	2–2	0–0
2	OH Leuven	6	2	2	2	4	4	0	23		1–1	—	1–0	1–0
3	Cercle Brugge	6	1	3	2	4	9	−5	23		1–1	0–0	—	0–5
4	Lommel United (R)	6	3	1	2	9	4	+5	19	Relegation to the 2017–18 Belgian First Amateur Division	2–1	2–1	0–1	—

Source: Belgian First Division B, Soccerway
Rules for classification: 1) Points; 2) Points without (possible) half points added due to rounding; 3) Matches won; 4) Goal difference; 5) Goals scored; 6) Away goals scored; 7) Away matches won; 8) Play-off.
(R) Relegated

== Season statistics ==
=== Top scorers ===
As of after the regular season.

Rank	Player	Club	Goals
1	(Belgium) Dylan De Belder	Lierse	21
2	(Belgium) Ivan Yagan	Cercle Brugge	13
3	(Belgium) Christophe Bertjens	Lommel United	12
4	(Mali) Mamadou Diallo	Tubize	10
4	(Slovenia) Nicolas Rajsel	Union SG	10
6	(Belgium) Esteban Casagolda	OH Leuven	8
6	(Brazil) Augusto Da Silva	Union SG	8
6	(Luxembourg) Aurélien Joachim	Lierse	8
6	(Croatia) Tomislav Kiš	Cercle Brugge	8
10	(North Macedonia) Jovan Kostovski	OH Leuven	7
10	(Ghana) William Owusu	Antwerp	7

=== Top assists ===
As of 28 April 2017.

Rank	Player	Club	Assists
1	(Belgium) Manuel Benson	Lierse	7
1	(Belgium) Kevin Kis	KSV Roeselare	7
3	(Cameroon) Serge Tabekou	Leuven	6
4	(Belgium) Tuur Dierckx	Antwerp	5
4	(Belgium) Ivan Yagan	Cercle Brugge	5
4	(Nigeria) Simon Zenke	Tubize-Braine	5
7	(Egypt) Ahmed Sayed	Lierse	4
7	(France) Raphaël Lecomte	Roeselare	4
7	(Luxembourg) Aurélien Joachim	Lierse	4
7	(Belgium) Thomas Azevedo	Leuven	4
7	(France) Samy Kehli	Roeselare	4

== Number of teams by provinces ==
Number of teams	Province	Team(s)
2	Antwerp	Antwerp and Lierse
2	West Flanders	Cercle Brugge and Roeselare
1	Brussels (not a province)	Union SG
1	Flemish Brabant	OH Leuven
1	Limburg	Lommel United
1	Walloon Brabant	Tubize
0	East Flanders, Hainaut, Liège, Luxembourg and Namur	/

== Attendances ==
#	Club	Average
1	Antwerp	11,556
2	Lierse	4,805
3	OHL	4,633
4	Cercle	3,285
5	Roeselare	2,368
6	Lommel	2,117
7	RUSG	2,029
8	Tubize	1,218
