= 2015–16 Belgian Second Division =

Belgian Second Division
- Season: 2015–16
- Champions: WS Brussels
- Promoted: Eupen
- Relegated: WS Brussels, Dessel Sport, Seraing United, Virton, ASV Geel, Deinze, Patro Eisden Maasmechelen, Heist and Coxyde.
- Matches: 160
- Goals: 462 (2.89 per match)
- Top goalscorer: Mamadou Diallo (15 goals)
- Biggest home win: Eupen 6–0 Patro Eisden (7 October 2015)
- Biggest away win: Heist 1–6 Tubize (17 October 2015)
- Highest scoring: Heist 1–6 Tubize (17 October 2015); Seraing 5–2 Heist (28 November 2015); Eupen 3–4 Antwerp (16 December 2015); Geel 4–3 Roeselare (19 December 2015)

The 2015–16 season of the Belgian Second Division (also known as Proximus League for sponsorship reasons) began on 8 August 2015 and ended in April 2016.

== Structural changes ==
This season was the last under the name Second Division. Starting from 2016-17 the league is known as First Division B as a result of reforms in the Belgian league system. The champions were promoted and 9 teams relegated to the third division named Amateur First Division or Amateur Superleague, while no team was promoted from the lower division. Promotion playoffs were not played and three-period rankings were not applied.

== Team changes ==
After promotion and relegation, only 11 teams of the previous season remained in the league, with 5 others being replaced. One team was not replaced, thus reducing the competition to 17 teams.

=== Out ===
- STVV were promoted as champions of the previous season.
- Leuven were promoted after winning the promotion playoffs.
- Woluwe-Zaventem were relegated to the Third Division after finishing 18th and for not applying for a license.
- KRC Mechelen were relegated to the Third Division after finishing 17th and for not applying for a license.
- Eendracht Aalst were relegated after failing to obtain a license.
- Mons folded as a team.

=== In ===
- Cercle Brugge were relegated from the Belgian Pro League after finishing in last place.
- Lierse were relegated from the Belgian Pro League after finishing third in the playoffs.
- Coxyde were promoted as champions from Third Division A.
- Union SG were promoted as runner-up from Third Division B, after champions Cappellen did not apply for a license.
- Deinze were promoted after winning the third division playoffs.

== Team information ==
Locations of the 2015–16 Belgian Second Division teams

Club	City	First season of current spell in second division	Coming from	2014-15 result	Stadium	Capacity
Royal Antwerp F.C.	Antwerp	2004–05	Belgian Pro League	10th (D2)	Bosuilstadion	16,649
Cercle Brugge K.S.V.	Bruges	2015–16	Belgian Pro League	15th (D1)	Jan Breydel Stadium	29,945
K.V.V. Coxyde	Koksijde	2015–16	Belgian Third Division	1st (D3A)	Henri Housaegerstadion	2,500
K.M.S.K. Deinze	Deinze	2015–16	Belgian Third Division	2nd (D3B)	Burgemeester Van de Wiele Stadion	7,515
K.F.C. Dessel Sport	Dessel	2012–13	Belgian Third Division	15th (D2)	Lorzestraat	5,000
K.A.S. Eupen	Eupen	2011–12	Belgian Pro League	3rd (D2)	Kehrweg Stadion	8,000
AS Verbroedering Geel	Geel	2013–14	Belgian Third Division	13th (D2)	De Leunen	10,022
K.S.K. Heist	Heist-op-den-Berg	2010–11	Belgian Third Division	14th (D2)	Gemeentelijk Sportcentrum	3,000
Lierse S.K.	Lier	2015–16	Belgian Pro League	16th (D1)	Herman Vanderpoortenstadion	14,538
Lommel United	Lommel	2005–06	Belgian Third Division	2nd (D2)	Soevereinstadion	12,500
K. Patro Eisden Maasmechelen	Maasmechelen	2014–15	Belgian Third Division	16th (D2)	Patro-stadion	5,000
K.S.V. Roeselare	Roeselare	2010–11	Belgian Pro League	11th (D2)	Schiervelde Stadion	9,075
Seraing United	Seraing	2014–15	Belgian Provincial Leagues	5th (D2)	Stade Pairay	6,744
A.F.C. Tubize	Tubize	2009–10	Belgian Pro League	8th (D2)	Stade Leburton	9,000
R. White Star Bruxelles	Brussels	2011–12	Belgian Third Division	12th (D2)	Stade Fallon	2,500
R.E. Virton	Virton	2013–14	Belgian Third Division	6th (D2)	Stade Yvan Georges	4,000
R. Union Saint-Gilloise	Saint-Gilles, Brussels	2015–16	Belgian Third Division	2nd (D3B)	Stade Joseph Marien	6,000

=== Personnel and kits ===
Club	Manager	Captain	Kit Manufacturer	Sponsors
Antwerp	(Belgium) David Gevaert	(Belgium)	Kappa	ONE Antwerp
Cercle	(Belgium) Frederik Vanderbiest	(Belgium)	Masita	ADMB
Coxyde	(Belgium) Hugo Vandenheede	(Belgium)	Jako	Vandermeeren
Dessel	(Belgium) Bart Wilmssen	(Belgium)	Saller	Tuytelaers
Deinze	(Netherlands) Dennis Van Wijk	(Belgium)	Nike	Declercq Stortbeton; Dakota
Eupen	(Spain) Tintín Márquez	(Belgium)	Burrda	Aspire Academy
Geel	(Belgium) Vincent Euvrard	(Belgium)	Olympic	Tormans
Heist	(Belgium) Francis Bosschaerts	(Belgium)	Saller	Kovera
Lierse	(Serbia) (Slovenia) Slaviša Stojanović	(Belgium)	Jako	Wadi Degla
Lommel	(Belgium) Bart De Roover	(Belgium)	Legea	Belien Auto; Derdaele+
Maasmechelen	(Belgium) Vacant	(Belgium)	Jartazi	e.Baillien
Roeselare	(Belgium) Franky Van Der Elst	(Belgium)	Joma	Euro Shop
Saint-Gilloise	(Belgium) Marc Grosjean	(Belgium)	Patrick	Culture et Formation
Seraing	(Belgium) (Croatia) Dražen Brnčić	(Belgium)	Masita	Startpeople; VOO
Tubize	(France) Colbert Marlot	(Belgium)	Kappa	No sponsor
Virton	(Belgium) Frank Defays	(Belgium)	Jako	Emond BMW
White Star	(Cameroon) John Bico	(Belgium)	Nike	No sponsor

== League table ==
Pos	Team	Pld	W	D	L	GF	GA	GD	Pts	Promotion or relegation
1	RWS Brussels (C, R, D)	32	19	6	7	53	28	+25	63	Relegation to the 2016–17 Belgian First Amateur Division (Note: WS Brussels was refused a Belgian professional football license and is thus not allowed to play in the 2016-17 Belgian First Division A or Division B and is instead relegated to the 2016–17 Belgian First Amateur Division. As a result, runner-up Eupen was promoted instead and ninth placed Roeselare avoided relegation.)
2	Eupen (P)	32	18	8	6	69	34	+35	62	Promotion to the 2016–17 Belgian First Division A
3	Antwerp	32	18	8	6	52	20	+32	62	Qualification to the 2016–17 Belgian First Division B
4	Tubize	32	17	6	9	51	34	+17	57	Qualification to the 2016–17 Belgian First Division B
5	Cercle Brugge	32	14	12	6	56	35	+21	54	Qualification to the 2016–17 Belgian First Division B
6	Union SG	32	15	6	11	50	34	+16	51	Qualification to the 2016–17 Belgian First Division B
7	Lierse	32	14	9	9	53	41	+12	51	Qualification to the 2016–17 Belgian First Division B
8	Lommel	32	14	8	10	43	29	+14	50	Qualification to the 2016–17 Belgian First Division B
9	Roeselare	32	14	8	10	46	47	−1	50	Qualification to the 2016–17 Belgian First Division B
10	Dessel (R)	32	14	6	12	38	40	−2	48	Relegation to the 2016–17 Belgian First Amateur Division
11	Seraing (R)	32	13	5	14	45	50	−5	44	Relegation to the 2016–17 Belgian First Amateur Division
12	Virton (R)	32	8	10	14	40	55	−15	34	Relegation to the 2016–17 Belgian First Amateur Division
13	ASV Geel (R)	32	6	13	13	40	56	−16	31	Relegation to the 2016–17 Belgian First Amateur Division
14	Deinze (R)	32	6	11	15	36	58	−22	29	Relegation to the 2016–17 Belgian First Amateur Division
15	Patro Eisden Maasmechelen (R)	32	5	9	18	33	63	−30	24	Relegation to the 2016–17 Belgian First Amateur Division
16	Heist (R)	32	4	7	21	39	82	−43	19	Relegation to the 2016–17 Belgian First Amateur Division
17	Coxyde (R)	32	2	10	20	29	67	−38	16	Relegation to the 2016–17 Belgian First Amateur Division

Rules for classification: 1) points; 2) goal difference; 3) number of goals scored.
(C) Champions; (D) Disqualified; (P) Promoted; (R) Relegated

=== Results ===
Home \ Away	ANT	CER	COX	DEI	DES	EUP	GEE	HEI	LIE	LOM	PEM	ROE	SER	TUB	USG	VIR	WSB
Antwerp		0–1	2–0	3–0	0–0	0–0	2–1	2–0	0–1	0–1	2–0	2–0	0–1	4–0	2–0	1–1	1–0
Cercle Brugge	2–2		1–0	1–0	1–1	4–0	3–3	2–0	2–2	0–0	1–1	2–1	4–0	1–3	1–1	2–2	1–1
Coxyde	0–3	2–2		2–2	0–1	0–2	0–2	2–2	1–1	0–1	2–2	2–4	0–3	3–2	2–3	3–3	0–5
Deinze	1–1	1–4	1–0		0–2	1–1	0–0	4–4	1–0	0–3	1–0	1–2	2–2	0–2	2–1	2–1	1–2
Dessel	0–3	0–3	1–1	2–0		2–2	1–2	3–1	0–1	1–0	4–0	0–1	0–3	1–0	1–3	2–0	0–3
Eupen	3–4	2–1	0–0	5–1	0–1		4–1	3–1	1–4	2–0	6–0	4–0	2–0	0–1	0–0	2–1	3–1
ASV Geel	1–1	3–3	2–2	2–2	1–1	0–3		1–1	2–1	1–1	0–0	4–3	0–2	2–1	2–1	0–1	2–2
Heist	1–3	0–2	3–0	1–1	0–2	1–5	2–1		0–1	1–2	1–4	1–2	2–2	1–6	1–3	4–1	1–0
Lierse	0–0	2–3	3–1	2–1	3–1	1–1	4–2	4–0		0–0	2–2	0–0	2–3	2–1	1–2	1–1	1–3
Lommel	0–1	0–2	3–1	3–3	2–0	0–3	4–1	3–1	0–0		5–1	2–0	2–0	1–1	3–1	4–1	0–0
Patro Eisden Maasmechelen	1–4	0–1	0–3	2–0	1–2	1–2	0–0	3–0	1–4	1–1		4–1	1–1	0–1	2–1	0–2	0–3
Roeselare	0–1	1–1	4–1	2–2	1–1	2–2	2–1	3–2	2–1	1–0	3–2		0–2	0–0	1–1	0–3	0–0
Seraing United	0–0	0–3	2–1	1–5	1–2	0–3	4–1	5–2	0–2	1–0	3–1	1–2		0–2	0–3	3–0	0–5 (Note: WS Brussels was awarded a 5-0 victory because opponents Seraing United fielded an ilegible player.)
Tubize	2–1	2–0	2–0	2–1	1–2	1–1	1–0	3–3	1–2	2–0	1–0	0–1	3–1		2–1	1–1	2–2
Union Saint-Gilloise	2–1	2–1	0–0	3–0	4–0	0–1	2–1	4–0	3–0	1–0	1–1	1–3	1–2	1–2		3–1	1–0
Virton	1–2	2–1	3–0	0–0	1–4	1–4	0–0	1–1	2–3	1–2	2–2	1–4	2–1	2–1	0–0		2–1
WS Brussels	0–4	1–0	2–0	2–0	1–0	4–2	2–1	4–1	4–2	1–0	3–0	2–0	1–0	0–2	1–0	1–0	

Updated to match(es) played on 13 March 2016. Source: Belgian Second Division (in French)
Legend: Blue = home team win; Yellow = draw; Red = away team win.
