= David Gevaert =

Belgian football manager

Personal information
- Date of birth: 15 April 1969 (age 57)

Managerial career
- Years: Team
- 1999–2002: Ingelmunster (physical)
- 2002–2003: Anderlecht (physical)
- 2003–2004: Eendracht Aalst (assistant)
- 2004–2005: Eendracht Aalst
- 2005–2007: Sparta Petegem
- 2007–2009: Racing Waregem
- 2009–2011: Zulte Waregem (youth)
- 2011–2014: Zulte Waregem (assistant)
- 2014–2015: JV De Pinte
- 2015–2016: Royal Antwerp
- 2016: Royal Antwerp
- 2016–2018: Dikkelvennne
- 2018–2019: Virton
- 2019–2021: Deinze

David Gevaert (born 15 April 1969) is a Belgian football manager.

== Career ==
Gevaert studied kinesiotherapy and was a physical trainer in K.S.V. Ingelmunster and R.S.C. Anderlecht, and assistant manager of Eendracht Aalst. Gevaert was promoted from Lorenzo Staelens' assistant when Staelens left in September 2004. Gevaert was sacked in Eendracht Aalst in January 2005, to be replaced with Gilbert Bodart who had been sacked by Oostende three days prior. He was then manager of Sparta Petegem, and until 2009 manager of third-tier club K. Racing Waregem. He was hired by Zulte Waregem in 2009, first as a developer for the promising players,

Gevaert worked at minnows JV De Pinte before he was hired as the new manager of Royal Antwerp F.C. in the summer of 2015. Director Patrick Decuyper knew Gevaert from Zulte Waregem. After missing promotion from the 2015–16 Belgian Second Division, Gevaert was relieved of his job in May 2016. He was succeeded by Frederik Vanderbiest, but was given other tasks within the club. As the team continued to struggle, Gevaert was asked to take over again in October 2016 with John Bico as director of sports. Gevaert resigned in November 2016.

Gevaert had a stint at KSC Dikkelvenne before being hired at Royal Excelsior Virton. He was sacked unexpectedly by Virton in February 2019. After the 2019 season had concluded, he was rumoured to join various clubs, but signed a two-year contract with K.M.S.K. Deinze.

== Personal life ==
Gevaert is married and resides in Nazareth, Belgium.
