= Tim Aline Rebeaud =

Swiss philanthropist (born 1972)

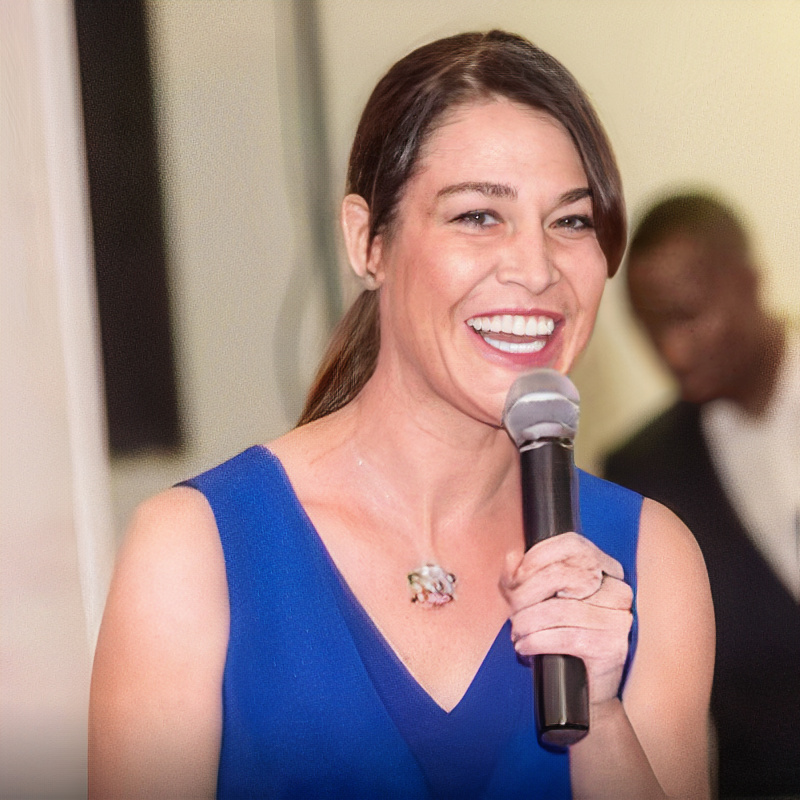
- Born: Aline Rebeaud; April 11, 1972 (age 54); Geneva, Switzerland
- Occupation: Philanthropist
- Years active: 1992-present
- Website: www.maison-chance.org

Tim Aline Rebeaud (French pronunciation: [tim alin ʀəbo]) (Vietnamese name: Hoang Nu Ngoc Tim) is known for her charity work and for the foundation the NGO Maison Chance in Vietnam. Maison Chance is a social structure helping street children, orphans, and disadvantaged and disabled people in Vietnam. Aline Rebeaud was given the name "Tim" - "heart" in Vietnamese. Today, she has dual citizenship for Switzerland and Vietnam.

== Maison Chance ==
The story of Maison Chance began in 1993. Aline Rebeaud was then a young painter who, during a trip to Vietnam, met an orphan named Thanh in the psychiatric treatment center of Thu Duc. Thanh, then 10 years old, suffered from cardiovascular, liver and lung disorders. The treating physicians expected him to live for no more than a few days. Aline decided to take charge over his case. She brought him to the hospital and took care of him during his whole three months stay there. That's when Aline got her nickname "Tim", which means "heart" in Vietnamese. Since that time Aline has been using her nickname instead of her given name. After leaving the hospital she rented a house in Ho Chi Minh City, where she moved in with the boy. During her first few months there she invited more disabled people to live together in her apartment. At that point she decided to establish a foundation, Maison Chance, meant for disadvantaged people in Vietnam. In 1998, Maison Chance received official recognition from Vietnamese authorities as a humanitarian non-governmental organization, free from all political or religious allegiance. Over time the organization grew and a single house became four centers: the Shelter, the Take Wings Center, Village Chance and Maison Chance Social Center.

Each center has a specific role:

- The Shelter offers housing for the most disadvantaged people and can welcome up to 70 people. The beneficiaries are given accommodation and food. In order to be allowed to stay at the shelter, they are required to attend school or follow vocational training at the Take Wings center.
- The Take Wings Center, which opened in 2006, is a vocational training center. The compound includes:

- Offices (Vietnamese and international)
- A medical care and rehabilitation space with an infirmary and a kinesiotherapy room
- A wheelchair repair workshop to fix vehicles for people with reduced mobility
- Vocational training workshops adapted for people with disabilities. The center offers workshops in painting, sewing, semi-precious stonecutting, bamboo woodwork, and IT. Some of the participants later take up work for remuneration at Maison Chance
The Center sells hand-made products including toys, oil paintings, bakery goods, honey and nuts.

- Village Chance opened in 2011. Its amenities include:

- A daycare centre and a primary school that is free for all Maison Chance residents and disadvantaged children from the neighborhood. In total, over 250 students attend the school
- 30 apartments, adapted to people with reduced mobility. It can be rented for a price lower than the average market price. The apartments are rented to families that have at least one person with a disability. As of 2022, about 100 people were living in Village Chance
- A bakery and a restaurant. Besides selling their goods, the bakery and the restaurant offer vocational training to young people in difficult situations. Workshops are held by Maison Chance beneficiaries
- An aquatic therapy pool heated by special pumps produced in Canada. Weekly therapy sessions are organized there with the paramedical staff

In 2017, more than 500 people benefited from Maison Chance care and services. The organization counted more than 70 employees.

- The Maison Chance Social Center in Krong No district, in Dak Nong province, Vietnam Central Highlands. The center is about 200 miles from Ho Chi Minh and opened in 2019. It offers;

- Accommodation for up to 250 people, medical care, a primary school, special needs classes, vocational training and organic agriculture (crops and animals)
- Ecotourism, volunteer trips, and a dining facility, as well as guest rooms with a capacity of up to 40 people, in order to collect funds for operations.

Several people with quadriplegia are living at the center on a long-term basis.

== Book ==
Tim, encouraged by her father Laurent, wrote a book about Maison Chance. The book is an autobiography recounting her journey and the story around Maison Chance. It came out in French in 2013, under the title “Maison Chance, un avenir pour les moins chanceux au Vietnam”. Its first part recounts Tim Aline's life since 1993, the second part gathers testimonies of 14 Maison Chance beneficiaries. In 2017, the book was published in Vietnamese under the title "Nhà may mắn, một tương lai cho những người thiếu may mắn". The Vietnamese edition was published under Aline's Vietnamese name, chosen when she received citizenship of Vietnam, Hoang Nu Ngoc Tim. The book is in the process of being translated into English.

== Awards and honors ==
- 2017: VUFO Award - Maison Chance received the VUFO (Vietnam Union of Friendship Organizations) Award for its meaningful contribution to Vietnam's socio-economic development from 2013 to 2017.
- 2015: Ho Chi Minh City People's Committee Prize - Tim and Maison Chance received the Ho Chi Minh City People’s Committee Price for their excellent achievements in implementing humanitarian programs and projects in Ho Chi Minh City for many years (from 2010 to 2012).
- 2014: VUFO Award - Maison Chance received the VUFO (Vietnam Union of Friendship Organizations) Award for its contribution to the socio-economic development of Vietnam in 2014.
- 2012: HUFO Award - Maison Chance received the HUFO (Ho Chi Minh City Union of Friendship Organizations) Award for its positive contribution to the development of the city in 2011.
- 2011: HUFO Award - Maison Chance received the HUFO (Ho Chi Minh City Union of Friendship Organizations) Award for its positive contribution to the development of the city in 2010.
- 2011: Medal of Labor Order - awarded to Tim by the President of the Socialist Republic of Vietnam himself.
- 2010: VUFO Award - Maison Chance received the VUFO (Vietnam Union of Friendship Organizations) Award for its contribution to poverty reduction and its help to Vietnam’s development.
- 2010: HUFO Award - Maison Chance received the HUFO (Ho Chi Minh City Union of Friendship Organizations) Award for its positive to the development of the city in 2009.
- 2010: Binh Tan District People's Committee Prize - awarded for Aline's contribution to the development of that district from 2005 to 2009.
- 2010: Ho Chi Minh City People's Committee Prize - Tim and Maison Chance received the award for support to poor people, handicapped people, and disadvantaged children.
- 2008: EEDCM Medal - given by the French Association EEDCM (Etoile Européenne du Dévouement Civil et Militaire)
- 2008: « Main dans la Main » Prize - awarded by the Swiss association Main dans la Main.
- 2002: Henry Dunant Field Prize - This prize was awarded to Tim by the International Red Cross.
