= De Deyselhof =

Coordinates: 52°25′36.25″N 4°54′43.43″E

- Interactive map of De Deyselhof

Restaurant information
- Established: 1966
- Closed: 1976
- Location: Zuideinde 25, Landsmeer, 1121 CJ, Netherlands

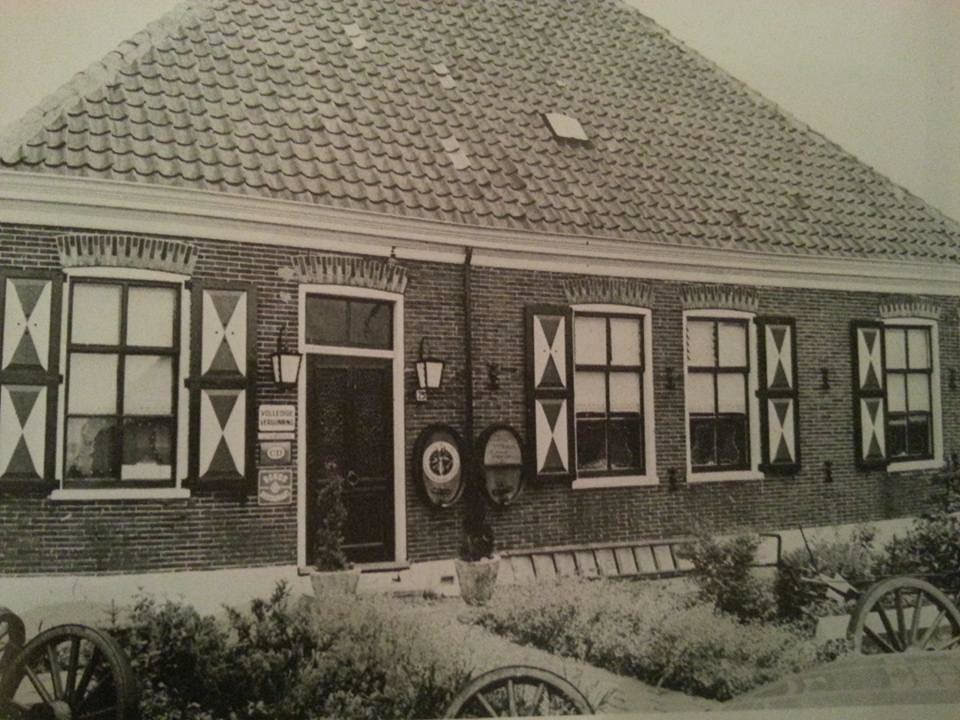

De Deyselhof is a defunct restaurant in Landsmeer, Netherlands. It was a fine dining restaurant that was awarded one Michelin star in both 1974 and 1975. The restaurant burned down in the night of 2 and 3 August 1976 and was never rebuilt.

Owner of the restaurant was John de Boer, who was also the head chef in the restaurant's first three years of operation. He later appointed another head chef, who earned the Michelin star.

De Deyselhof was a member of the Alliance Gastronomique Néerlandaise at least from 1971 to 1975.

On the former location of the restaurant is now the estate Deijsselhof.

== See also ==
- List of Michelin starred restaurants in the Netherlands
