= Nicholas Tamsin =

Belgian footballer (born 1989)

Personal information
- Date of birth: 10 December 1989 (age 36)
- Place of birth: Bruges, Belgium
- Height: 1.78 m (5 ft 10 in)
- Position: Defender

Youth career
- 1994–1995: De Barms Sijsele
- 1995–2008: Cercle Brugge

Senior career*
Years	Team	Apps	(Gls)
2008–2010	Turnhout	29	(1)
2010–2011	Zulte Waregem	9	(0)
2011–2012	Waasland-Beveren	1	(0)
2012–2016	Coxyde	138	(18)
2016–2017	Knokke		
2017–2018	Sint-Eloois-Winkel		
2018–2022	Mandel United	67	(4)
2022	Eendracht Wervik		
- * Club domestic league appearances and goals

Nicholas Tamsin (born 10 December 1989) is a Belgian former professional footballer who played as a defender.

== Football career ==
Tamsin progressed through the youth teams of FC De Barms Sijsele and Cercle Brugge. He almost reached the first team of the latter in 2008, but was not deemed ready for the highest division and signed with second-tier club Turnhout. In the summer of 2010, he returned to the highest tier, after Zulte Waregem signed him on a two-year contract.

Tamsin made his debut in the Belgian First Division A on 23 October 2010, coming on as a substitute for Steve Colpaert against Lierse during half-time. After one season with Zulte Waregem, he moved to ambitious second-tier club Waasland-Beveren, but only stayed there for six months before moving to third-tier club Coxyde. He continued to play for the team for almost five seasons. After the relegation from the Belgian Second Division, he signed with Knokke, another coastal club. Later, he would also appear for Sint-Eloois-Winkel and Mandel United.
