= Hassie van Wijk =

Dutch football player and manager (1939–2026)

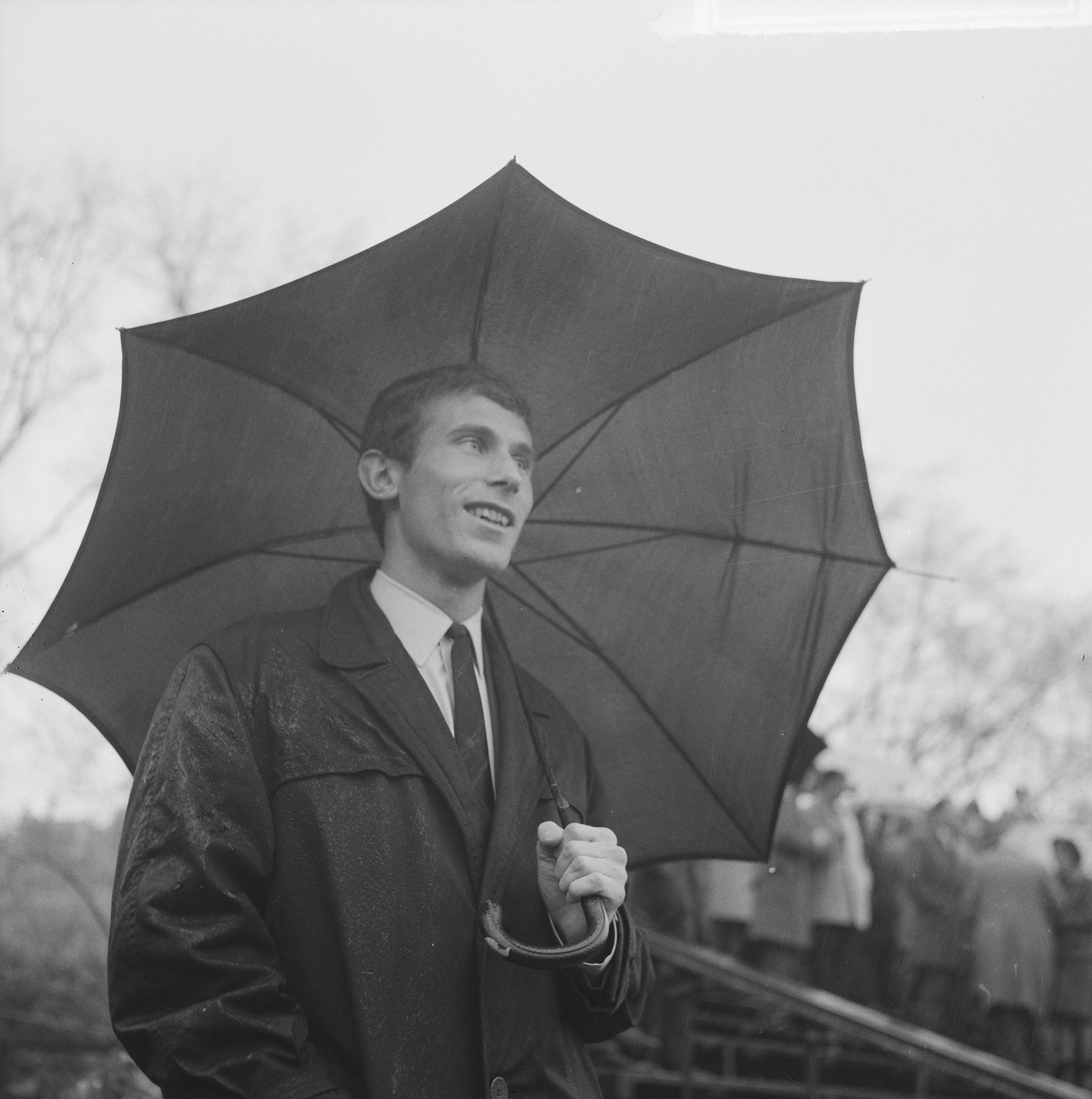
- Van Wijk in 1963

Personal information
- Date of birth: 10 May 1939
- Place of birth: Amsterdam, Netherlands
- Date of death: 30 July 2026 (aged 87)
- Place of death: Landsmeer, Netherlands
- Position: Midfielder

Senior career*
Years	Team	Apps	(Gls)
1958–1963	De Volewijckers	59+	(7+)
1963–1964	ADO Den Haag	27	(0)
1964–1968	Telstar	102	(8)
1968–1971	AZ '67	34	(1)
Total		222+	(16+)

International career
	Netherlands U21	2	(0)

Managerial career
- AZ '67 (assistant)
- De Spartaan
- Ajax (youth)
- DWG
- Ajax U19
- Jong Ajax
- 1982–1984: Ajax (assistant)
- * Club domestic league appearances and goals

Hassie van Wijk (10 May 1939 – 30 July 2026) was a Dutch football player and manager who played as a midfielder.

== Playing career ==
Van Wijk began his career at De Volewijckers, helping them achieve promotion to the Eredivisie. In the summer of 1963, following the club's relegation to the Eerste Divisie, he signed for ADO Den Haag, where he made a total of 30 appearances before joining Telstar the following summer. After three seasons at Telstar, he joined AZ '67, where he spent another three seasons before retiring.

He also made two appearances for the Netherlands under-21 national team.

== Managerial career ==
Following his retirement, van Wijk became an assistant manager at AZ Alkmaar, before later serving as the manager of De Spartaan. During the early 1970s, he was offered a youth coaching role at Ajax by board member André Kraan, which he accepted. However, he didn't feel at home at the club, and eventually joined DWG. At the recommendation of Arie van Eijden, he returned to Ajax, this time as the manager of Ajax's A1 (under-19) team and Jong Ajax. Eventually, he was appointed an assistant manager for the club under Aad de Mos. On 5 December 1983, he notably helped orchestrate a penalty kick for Ajax, which was taken in two parts by Jesper Olsen and Johan Cruyff against Helmond Sport.

On 29 January 1984, during a friendly match against HMSH in The Hague, the concrete roof of the stadium's dugout collapsed due to the weight of children that had been sitting on it. A total of eight people were injured, with van Wijk being the most serious, as he suffered a broken neck and shattered left foot, with all his toes having to be amputated. Despite wanting to return to the club, he was declared unfit, resulting in him leaving football.

== Personal life and death ==
Van Wijk had two children. His son Dennis was also a footballer and manager, who played for the likes of Ajax, Norwich City and Club Brugge, while his daughter married Belgian international footballer Marc Degryse.

Van Wijk died in his sleep in Landsmeer, on 30 July 2026, at the age of 87.
