= Landsmeer =

- Municipality
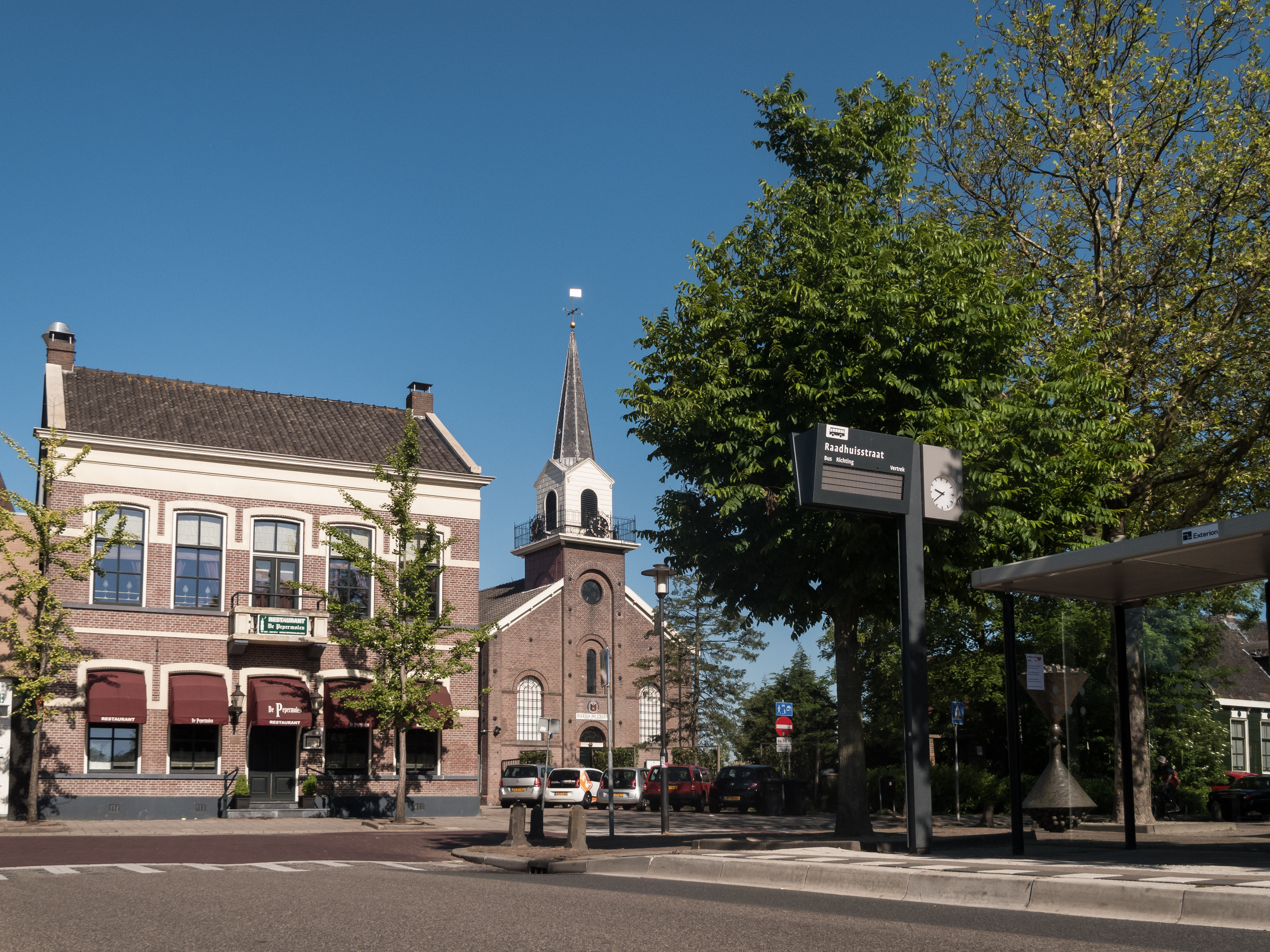
- Landsmeer town centre

- Flag Coat of arms

- Location in North Holland
- Coordinates: 52°26′N 4°55′E
- Country: Netherlands
- Province: North Holland

Government
  - Body: Municipal council
  - Mayor: Léon de Lange (D66)

Area
  - Total: 26.50 km^{2} (10.23 sq mi)
  - Land: 22.53 km^{2} (8.70 sq mi)
  - Water: 3.97 km^{2} (1.53 sq mi)
- Elevation: −1 m (−3.3 ft)

Population (January 2021)
  - Total: 11,565
  - Density: 513/km^{2} (1,330/sq mi)
- Time zone: UTC+1 (CET)
  - Summer (DST): UTC+2 (CEST)
- Postcode: 1120–1127, 1451
- Area code: 020
- Website: www.landsmeer.nl

Landsmeer (Dutch pronunciation: [ˌlɑntsˈmeːr]) is a municipality and a town in the Netherlands, in the province of North Holland.

== Population centres ==
The municipality of Landsmeer consists of three villages: Den Ilp, Landsmeer, Purmerland.

=== Topography ===
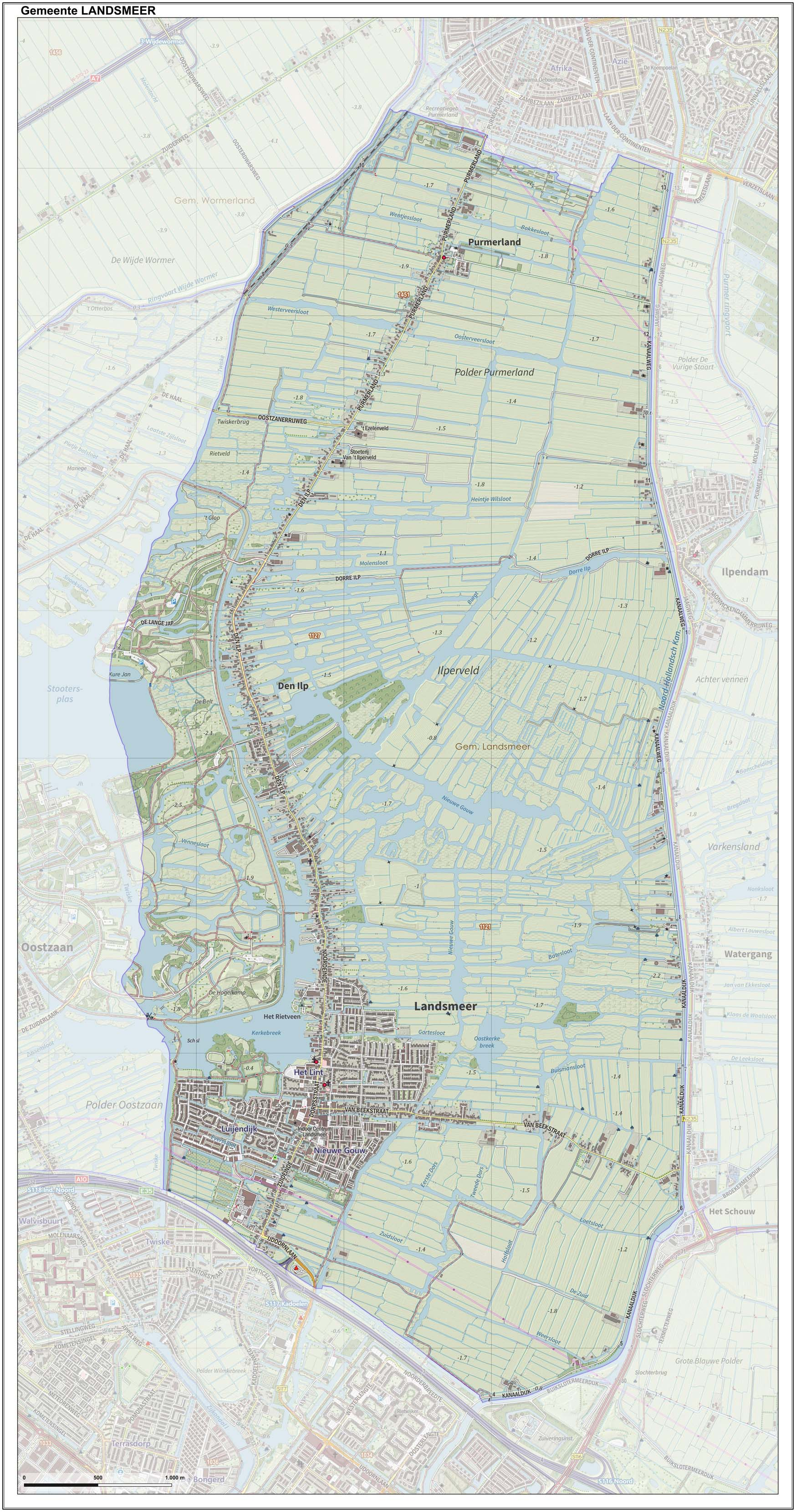
Map of the municipality of Landsmeer, June 2015

== Local government ==
The municipal council of Landsmeer has 15 seats, which at the 2026 local election divided as follows:

- Lokaal Landsmeer - 5 seats
- GroenLinks / PvdA - 3 seats
- VVD - 2 seats
- D66 - 2 seats
- DorpsBelang - 2 seats
- CDA - 1 seat

== Town twinning ==
Landsmeer is twinned with the following towns:

- Bergneustadt, North Rhine-Westphalia, Germany since 1968
- Châtenay-Malabry, Hauts-de-Seine, France since 1986

== Notable people ==
- Sam Olij (1900–1975), heavyweight boxer, competed at the 1928 Summer Olympics, member of the national socialist NSB party in WWII
- Jaap Oudkerk (1937–2024), cyclist who competed at the 1960 and 1964 Summer Olympics
- Hassie van Wijk (1939–2026), footballer and manager
- Bernt Schneiders (born 1959), politician, mayor of Landsmeer 1995–2001
- Cor Bakker (born 1961), pianist
- Enzo Stroo (born 1994), footballer

== Gallery ==
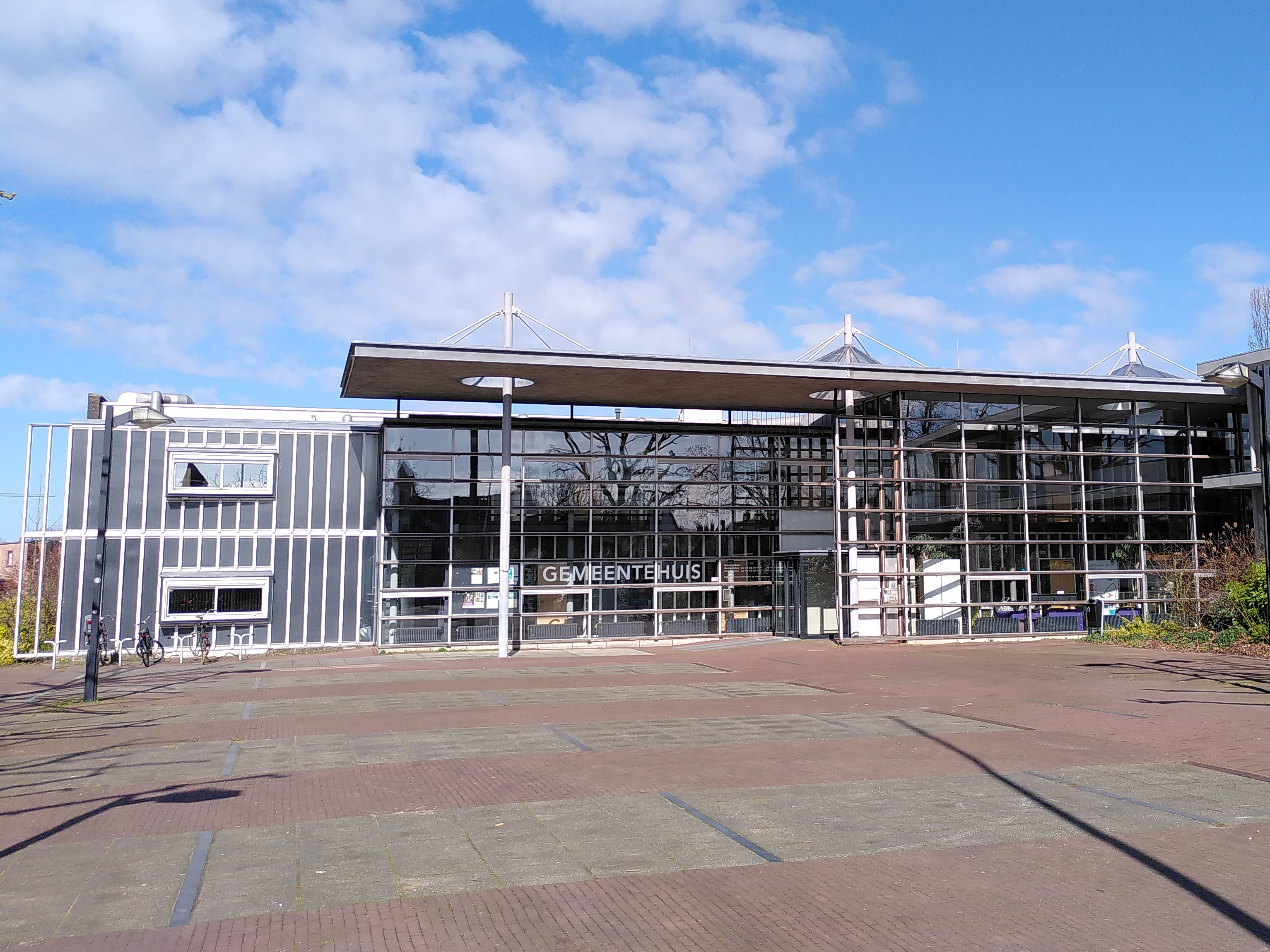
The town hall of Landsmeer.

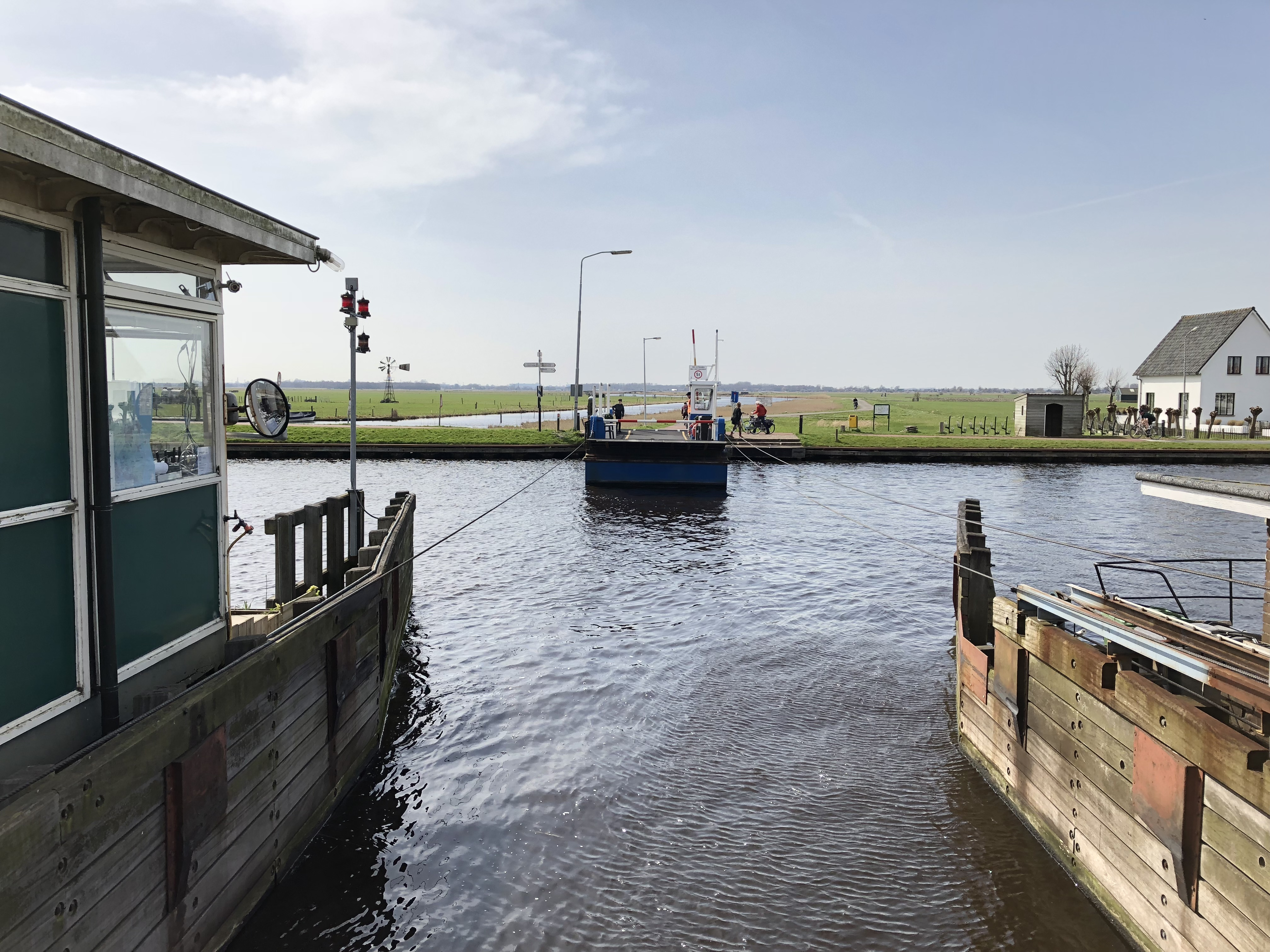
Ferry, Ilpendam - Landsmeer

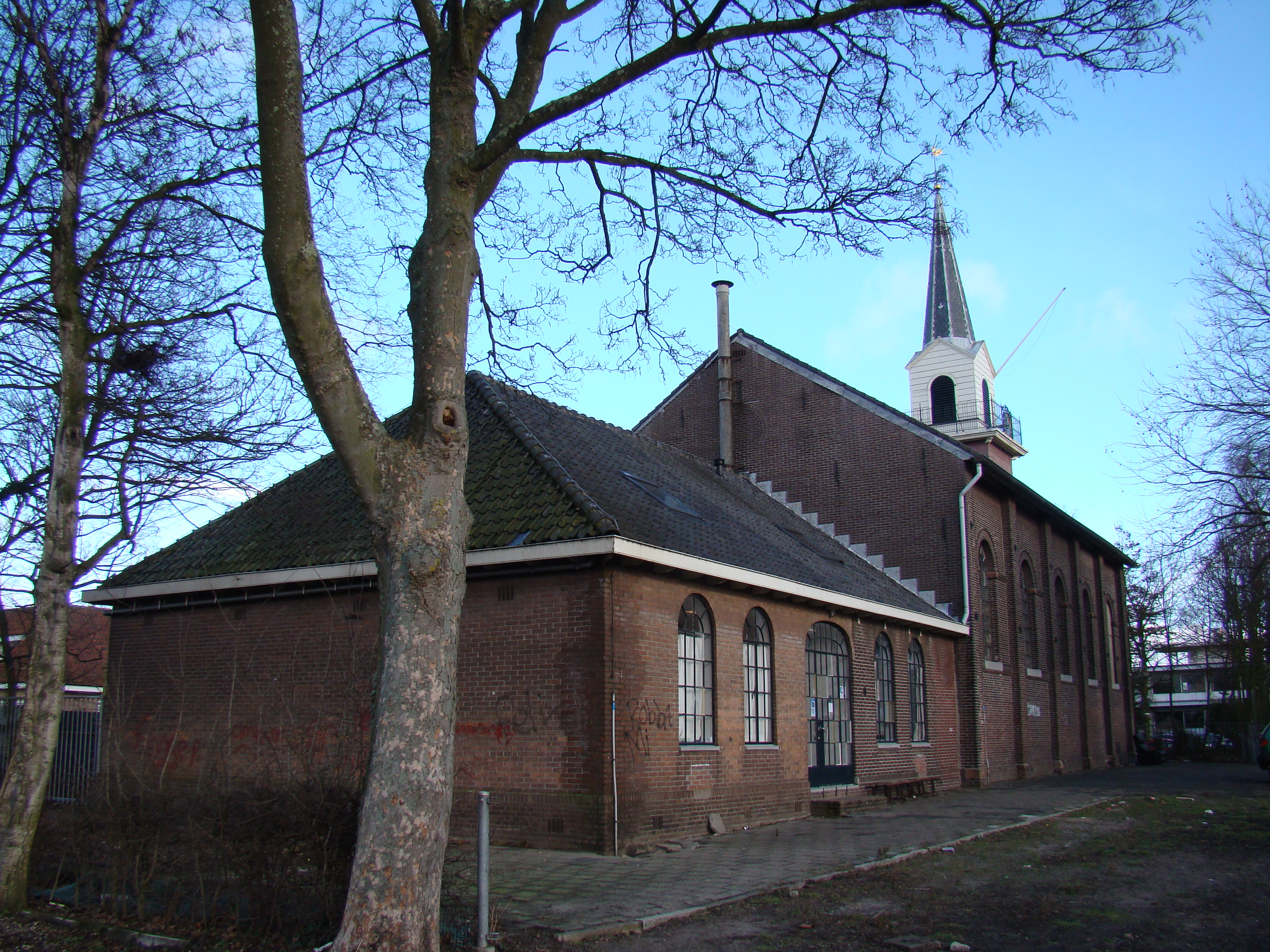
Landsmeer, Little Church

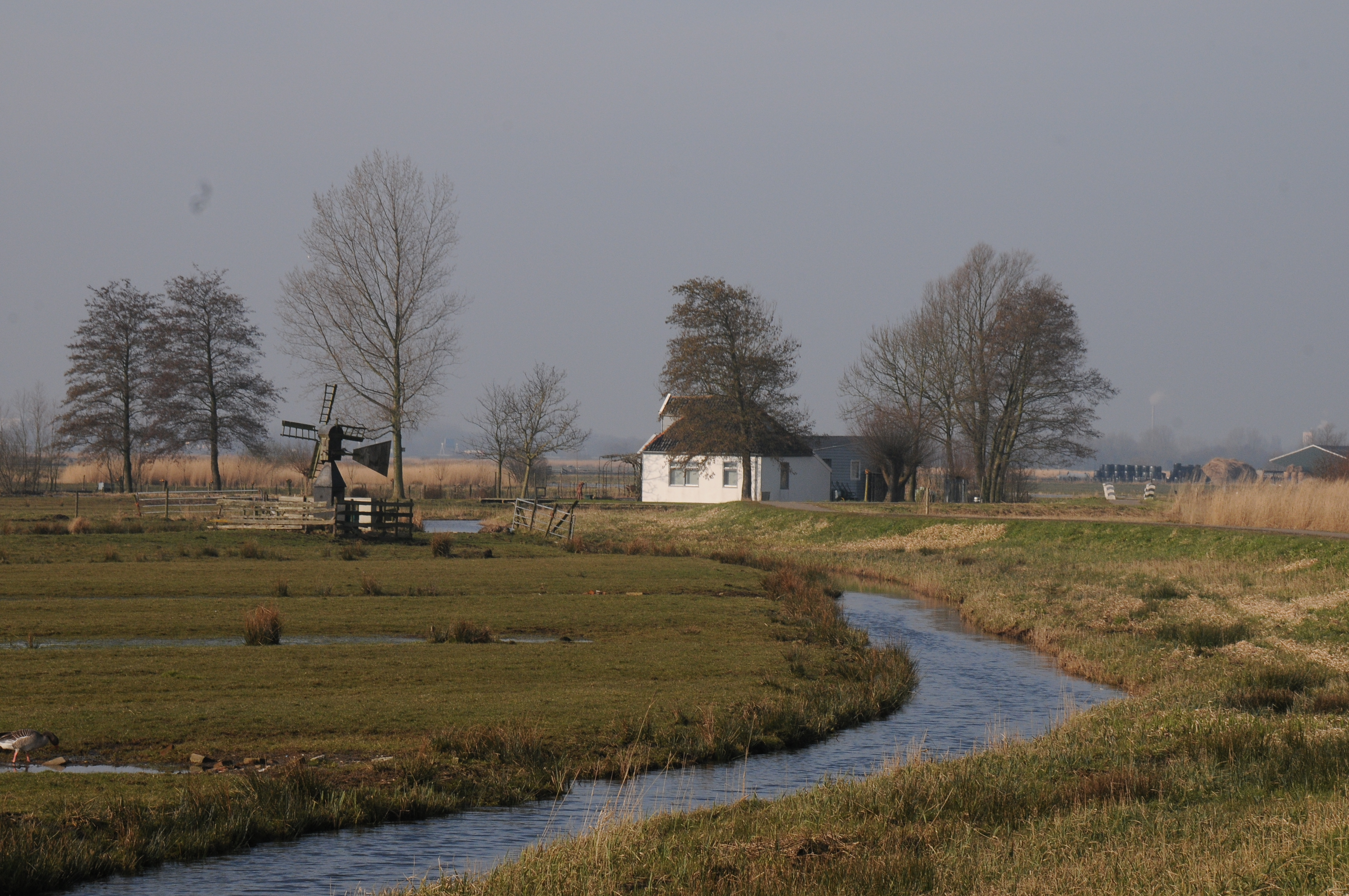
Meadows, polders, windmills and much water in North Holland

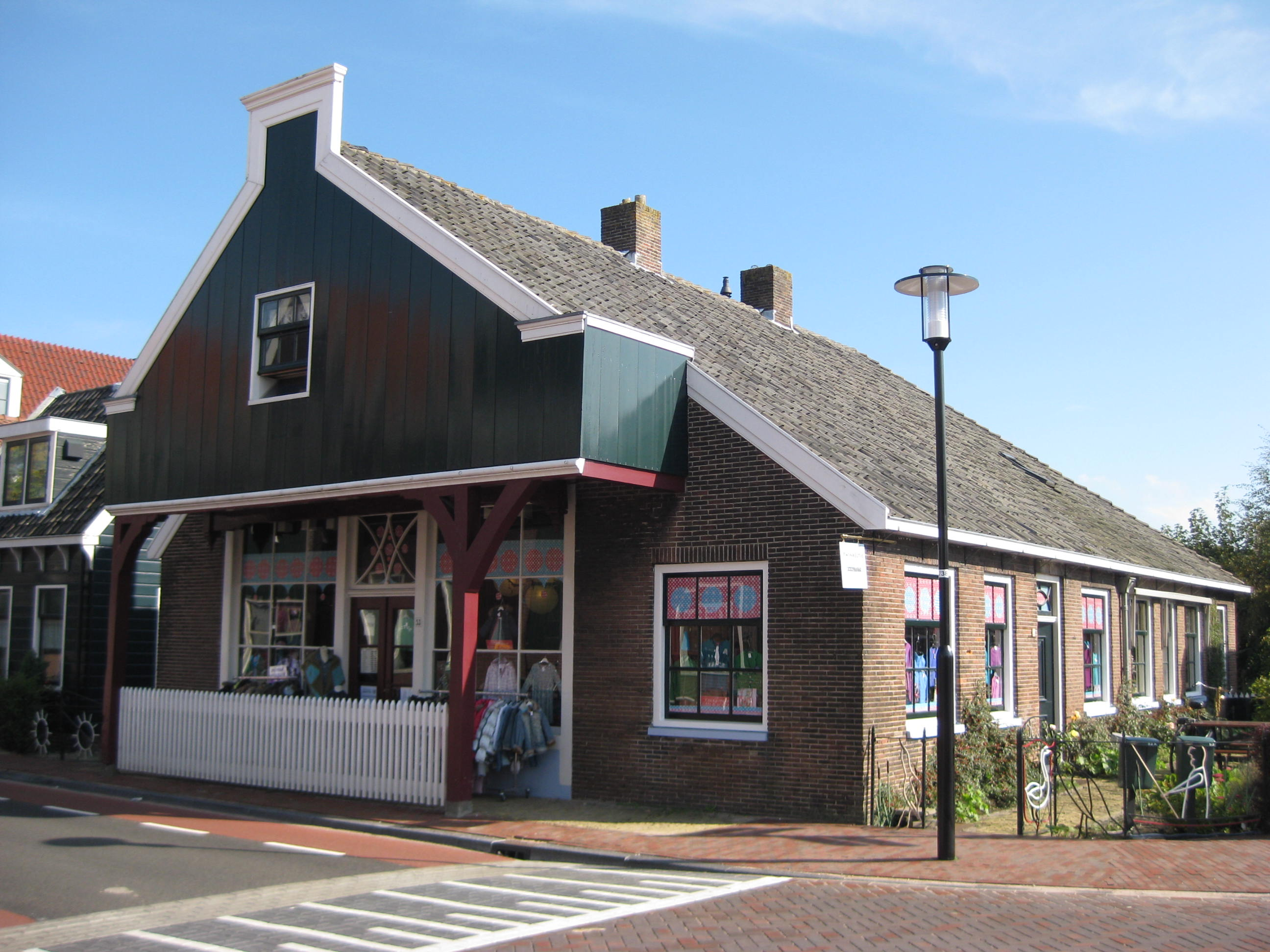
Landsmeer, Dorpsstraat 53
