= 2015–16 Belgian Third Division =

Belgian Third Divisions
- Season: 2015–16

The 2015–16 season of the Belgian Third Divisions is the 89th season of the third-tier football league in Belgium, since it was established in 1926.

== Participating teams ==
The league is composed of 37 teams split into two groups of 18 and 19. Teams will play only other teams in their own division.

As a part of changes in the Belgian league system to be implemented in 2016, the Third Division was rebranded as First Amateur Division and contracted to 16 teams. The three-period rankings and promotion playoff between third and fourth tier teams were scrapped. The 11 (or 12) teams in each group relegate to the restructured fourth division called Second Amateur Division, while the last placers also relegate to the new fifth division called Third Amateur Division.

For the 2016–17 season onwards, the Amateur Superleague is made up of 16 teams, namely the nine relegated from the 2015–16 Second Division, the 2015–16 champion and runner-up of each Third Division group, the winner of qualifying playoffs contested by four teams in each group, and the winner of the match between losing playoff finalists. These teams must meet technical and administrative criteria.

Group A

- Acrenoise
- Bornem
- Eendracht Aalst
- FCV Dender EH
- Gent-Zeehaven
- FC Gullegem
- Hamme
- Izegem
- La Louvière Centre
- Londerzeel
- Olsa Brakel
- Oudenaarde
- Racing Mechelen
- Sint-Eloois-Winkel
- Sint-Niklase
- Sparta Petegem
- Temse
- Torhout

Group B

- Beerschot Wilrijk
- Berchem Sport
- Bocholter VV
- Cappellen
- Diegem Sport
- Grimbergen
- Hamoir
- Hasselt
- Hoogstraten
- Liège
- Oosterzonen Oosterwijk
- Rupel Boom
- Sprimont Comblain
- Tempo Overijse
- Tienen-Hageland
- Union La Calamine
- Walhain
- Wallonne Ciney
- Woluwe-Zaventem

== League tables ==
Due to a reform in the Belgian football league, the Belgian Third Division ceases to exist and is replaced by the Belgian Second Amateur Division from the 2016–17 season, now at the fourth level of Belgian football. A newly created league, the Belgian First Amateur Division is formed at the third level, effectively pushing the teams in this division one level down the pyramid. Only the top two teams in each division and the two promotion playoff winners are "promoted" to the new league, meaning they will remain at the third level, while most of the teams effectively drop to the fourth level. The two teams finishing in last position in each group are relegated to the Belgian Third Amateur Division, which in fact means a drop from level 3 to level 5 of the pyramid.

=== Group A ===
Pos	Team	Pld	W	D	L	GF	GA	GD	Pts	Qualification or relegation
1	Hamme (C, P)	34	21	5	8	66	31	+35	68	Qualification to the 2016–17 Belgian First Amateur Division
2	Sint-Eloois-Winkel (Note: Sint-Eloois-Winkel did not apply for a Belgian remunerated football license and is thus not allowed to play in the 2016-17 Belgian First Amateur Division. As a result, third placed Oudenaarde was promoted instead.)	34	16	13	5	56	43	+13	61	Relegation to the 2016–17 Belgian Second Amateur Division
3	Oudenaarde (Note: Normally, the teams finishing in positions 3 to 6 were set to participate in the promotion playoffs (together with the teams finishing in the same positions in Group B) for the three remaining places in the 2016-17 Belgian First Amateur Division. Due to the fact that Sint-Eloois-Winkel, Sparta Petegem and Temse did not apply for a license and Oudenaarde was promoted, the playoff was contested by the four teams finishing highest in the league that did receive a licence, allowing Eendracht Aalst and La Louvière Centre to take part as well.) (P)	34	17	9	8	70	45	+25	60	Qualification to the 2016–17 Belgian First Amateur Division
4	FCV Dender EH (P)	34	16	11	7	69	43	+26	59	Qualification to the Promotion play-offs
5	Londerzeel	34	17	8	9	58	37	+21	59	Qualification to the Promotion play-offs
6	Sparta Petegem	34	16	8	10	66	54	+12	56	Relegation to the 2016–17 Belgian Second Amateur Division
7	Eendracht Aalst	34	15	9	10	66	55	+11	54	Qualification to the Promotion play-offs
8	Temse	34	15	8	11	60	48	+12	53	Relegation to the 2016–17 Belgian Second Amateur Division
9	La Louvière Centre	34	14	8	12	54	44	+10	50	Qualification to the Promotion play-offs
10	Olsa Brakel	34	11	13	10	56	46	+10	46	Relegation to the 2016–17 Belgian Second Amateur Division
11	Gullegem	34	10	15	9	50	45	+5	45	Relegation to the 2016–17 Belgian Second Amateur Division
12	Gent-Zeehaven	34	11	10	13	50	56	−6	43	Relegation to the 2016–17 Belgian Second Amateur Division
13	Sint-Niklase	34	11	9	14	51	57	−6	42	Relegation to the 2016–17 Belgian Second Amateur Division
12	Bornem	34	9	11	14	54	56	−2	38	Relegation to the 2016–17 Belgian Second Amateur Division
15	Izegem	34	7	7	20	51	73	−22	28	Relegation to the 2016–17 Belgian Second Amateur Division
16	Torhout	34	8	4	22	29	75	−46	28	Relegation to the 2016–17 Belgian Second Amateur Division
17	Acrenoise	34	5	9	20	37	86	−49	24	Relegation to the 2016–17 Belgian Second Amateur Division
18	Racing Mechelen	34	5	7	22	33	82	−49	22	Relegation to the 2016–17 Belgian Third Amateur Division

Updated to match(es) played on 1 May 2016. Source: Group A at Soccerway
Rules for classification: 1) points; 2) goal difference; 3) number of goals scored.
(C) Champions; (P) Promoted

=== Group B ===
Pos	Team	Pld	W	D	L	GF	GA	GD	Pts	Qualification or relegation
1	Beerschot Wilrijk (C, P)	36	21	8	7	64	39	+25	71	Qualification to the 2016–17 Belgian First Amateur Division
2	Oosterzonen Oosterwijk (P)	36	19	14	3	68	38	+30	71	Qualification to the 2016–17 Belgian First Amateur Division
3	Bocholter	36	19	7	10	52	41	+11	64	Qualification to the Promotion play-offs
4	Hasselt (P)	36	18	6	12	63	41	+22	60	Qualification to the Promotion play-offs
5	Wallonne Ciney (Note: Ciney did not apply for a Belgian remunerated football license and is thus not allowed to play in the 2016-17 Belgian First Amateur Division. As a result, seventh placed Liège was allowed to participate in the promotion playoffs for the three remaining places in the 2016-17 Belgian First Amateur Division.)	36	17	6	13	57	42	+15	57	Relegation to the 2016–17 Belgian Second Amateur Division
6	Sprimont-Comblain (P)	36	16	8	12	56	43	+13	56	Qualification to the Promotion play-offs
7	Liège	36	15	8	13	58	56	+2	53	Qualification to the Promotion play-offs
8	Hamoir	36	15	7	14	70	74	−4	52	Relegation to the 2016–17 Belgian Second Amateur Division
9	Rupel Boom	36	15	6	15	65	55	+10	51	Relegation to the 2016–17 Belgian Second Amateur Division
10	Berchem Sport	36	14	8	14	51	55	−4	50	Relegation to the 2016–17 Belgian Second Amateur Division
11	Cappellen	36	14	7	15	51	56	−5	49	Relegation to the 2016–17 Belgian Second Amateur Division
12	Hoogstraten	36	13	9	14	60	60	0	48	Relegation to the 2016–17 Belgian Second Amateur Division
13	Walhain	36	12	11	13	48	57	−9	47	Relegation to the 2016–17 Belgian Second Amateur Division
14	Tempo Overijse	36	12	9	15	47	56	−9	45	Relegation to the 2016–17 Belgian Second Amateur Division
15	Union La Calamine	36	12	4	20	44	59	−15	40	Relegation to the 2016–17 Belgian Second Amateur Division
16	Tienen-Hageland	36	10	10	16	52	56	−4	40	Relegation to the 2016–17 Belgian Second Amateur Division
17	Grimbergen	36	9	7	20	38	55	−17	34	Relegation to the 2016–17 Belgian Second Amateur Division
18	Woluwe-Zaventem	36	9	6	21	34	61	−27	33	Relegation to the 2016–17 Belgian Second Amateur Division
19	Diegem Sport	36	8	7	21	33	67	−34	31	Relegation to the 2016–17 Belgian Third Amateur Division

Updated to match(es) played on 1 May 2016. Source: Group B at Soccerway
Rules for classification: 1) points; 2) goal difference; 3) number of goals scored.
(C) Champions; (P) Promoted

=== Promotion play-offs ===
The eight teams taking part in the promotion play-offs are playing to win one of the three remaining places in the 2016-17 Belgian First Amateur Division. The final match between the winners of Round 2, Sprimont-Comblain and FCV Dender EH, was not played as both teams already achieved promotion by winning Round 2. Hasselt beat La Louvière Centre in the third place match and took the final promotion spot. The five losing teams will play in the 2016-17 Belgian Second Amateur Division, effectively one level lower than in the 2015-16 season.

Round 1
Bocholter	1	1	2
Sprimont-Comblain	2	3	4
Liège	1	0	1
Hasselt	1	0	1 (a)
Londerzeel	1	1	2
FCV Dender EH	2	0	2 (a)
La Louvière Centre	1	5	6
Eendracht Aalst	3	0	3

Round 2
Sprimont-Comblain	3	3	6
Hasselt	0	0	0
FCV Dender EH	2	1	3
La Louvière Centre	0	1	1

Round 3
Third place
La Louvière Centre	2	0	2
Hasselt	3	4	7
