= 2016–17 Belgian First Amateur Division =

Belgian First Amateur Division
- Season: 2016–17

The 2016–17 Belgian First Amateur Division is the inaugural season of the newly created division at the third-tier football league in Belgium, as it was established in 2016. The fixtures were announced on 23 June 2016.

== Participating teams ==
Locations of the 2016–17 Belgian First Amateur Division teams

For the inaugural season the following teams will participate:

- The bottom eight teams from the 2015–16 Belgian Second Division: Dessel Sport, Seraing United, Virton, ASV Geel, Deinze, Patro Eisden Maasmechelen, Heist and Coxyde
- WS Brussels who were refused a Belgian professional football license and were therefore relegated to the Belgian First Amateur Division in spite of becoming champions in the 2015–16 Belgian Second Division. As a result, Roeselare avoided relegation and remained in the Belgian Second Division.
- The top two teams in both group A and group B of the 2015–16 Belgian Third Division that had applied and obtained a Belgian remunerated football license: Hamme, Oudenaarde, Beerschot Wilrijk and Oosterzonen Oosterwijk
- The three Promotion play-offs winners: Sprimont-Comblain, FCV Dender EH and Hasselt.

== Regular season ==
=== League table ===
| Pos | Team | Pld | W | D | L | GF | GA | GD | Pts | Qualification or relegation |
|---|---|---|---|---|---|---|---|---|---|---|
| 1 | Beerschot Wilrijk (Note: On 5 April 2017, the Belgian FA announced that Beerschot Wilrijk was the only team which had asked and obtained a Belgian professional football license for the coming season, giving the right to play at the professional levels of Belgian football and necessary to be able to promote from the Belgian First Amateur Division. Only Deinze had also made the request but it had only received a Belgian remunerated football license. As a result, Beerschot-Wilrijk was already certain of the promotion even before the end of the regular season, let alone the promotional play-offs.) (P) | 30 | 26 | 2 | 2 | 63 | 16 | +47 | 80 | Qualification for the promotion play-offs |
| 2 | Dessel | 30 | 20 | 6 | 4 | 68 | 28 | +40 | 66 | Qualification for the promotion play-offs |
| 3 | Virton | 30 | 19 | 2 | 9 | 63 | 30 | +33 | 59 | Qualification for the promotion play-offs |
| 4 | Heist | 30 | 16 | 3 | 11 | 61 | 42 | +19 | 51 | Qualification for the promotion play-offs |
| 5 | Dender EH | 30 | 15 | 5 | 10 | 53 | 43 | +10 | 50 | |
| 6 | Deinze | 30 | 14 | 6 | 10 | 46 | 34 | +12 | 48 (Note: On 24 February 2017, following a complaint from Seraing United and Sprimont-Comblain, the appeal committee ruled that Deinze defender Jarric Buysse was not correctly registered and all matches in which he played were to be converted on 0-5 losses for Deinze. Buysse played in 16 of the 22 matches played at that time, causing Deinze to drop from third place (41 points) to last place (7 points). On 4 May 2017, after the regular season had finished, the arbitrage committee ruled that Deinze should be awarded the points. As a result, Deinze moved from last place (14 points) to sixth place (48 points) and as a result was saved from relegation.) | |
| 7 | Seraing | 30 | 14 | 6 | 10 | 42 | 36 | +6 | 48 | |
| 8 | ASV Geel | 30 | 13 | 5 | 12 | 53 | 44 | +9 | 44 | |
| 9 | Oudenaarde | 30 | 12 | 4 | 14 | 41 | 43 | −2 | 40 | |
| 10 | Patro Eisden Maasmechelen | 30 | 11 | 5 | 14 | 37 | 41 | −4 | 38 | |
| 11 | Hamme | 30 | 9 | 8 | 13 | 52 | 59 | −7 | 35 | |
| 12 | Oosterzonen Oosterwijk | 30 | 8 | 7 | 15 | 32 | 44 | −12 | 31 | |
| 13 | Hasselt (R) | 30 | 6 | 8 | 16 | 29 | 48 | −19 | 26 | Qualification for the Second Amateur Division Promotion play-offs Final |
| 14 | Coxyde (Note: On 8 February 2017, Coxyde announced that it did not apply for a Belgian remunerated football license for the coming season and will therefore automatically relegate to the 2017–18 Belgian Second Amateur Division irrespective of its finishing position. Eventually the club decided not to participate in the 2017–18 season, only to restart at the lowest level of Belgian football as part of the 2018–19 season.) (R) | 30 | 6 | 4 | 20 | 27 | 81 | −54 | 22 | Relegation to the Second Amateur Division |
| 15 | WS Brussels (Note: WS Brussels was refused a Belgian remunerated football license and did not appeal the decision, as a result the club will relegate automatically.) (D, R) | 30 | 4 | 8 | 18 | 23 | 66 | −43 | 20 | Relegation to the Second Amateur Division |
| 16 | Sprimont-Comblain (R) | 30 | 4 | 7 | 19 | 30 | 61 | −31 | 19 | Relegation to the Second Amateur Division |

Source: Belgian First Division A (in Dutch), Soccerway
Rules for classification: 1) Points; 2) Goal difference; 3) Goals scored.
(D) Disqualified; (P) Promoted; (R) Relegated

=== Results ===
| Home \ Away | B-W | COX | DEI | DEN | DES | GEE | HAM | HAS | HEI | OOS | OUD | PAT | SER | SPR | VIR | WSB |
|---|---|---|---|---|---|---|---|---|---|---|---|---|---|---|---|---|
| Beerschot Wilrijk | — | 4–0 | 0–1 | 1–0 | 1–3 | 2–0 | 1–1 | 3–0 | 4–2 | 3–1 | 1–0 | 2–1 | 2–1 | 3–1 | 3–0 | 2–0 |
| Coxyde | 0–1 | — | 2–0 | 2–1 | 2–0 | 3–1 | 1–5 | 2–1 | 0–5 | 1–1 | 0–3 | 0–0 | 1–2 | 0–4 | 0–5 | 2–2 |
| Deinze | 0–1 (Note: On 24 February 2017, following a complaint from Seraing United and Sprimont-Comblain, the appeal committee ruled that Deinze defender Jarric Buysse was not correctly registered and all matches in which he played were to be converted on 0-5 losses for Deinze. Buysse played in 16 of the 22 matches played at that time, causing Deinze to drop from third place (41 points) to last place (7 points). On 4 May 2017, after the regular season had finished, the arbitrage committee ruled that Deinze should be awarded the points. As a result, Deinze moved from last place (14 points) to sixth place (48 points) and as a result was saved from relegation.) | 4–0 | — | 0–0 | 0–0 | 2–1 | 1–1 | 1–0 | 2–1 | 3–2 | 0–1 | 1–2 | 0–2 | 2–0 | 2–1 | 6–0 |
| Dender EH | 0–2 | 5–2 | 1–2 | — | 2–0 | 2–1 | 2–2 | 1–0 | 4–5 | 5–1 | 1–0 | 1–2 | 0–0 | 4–3 | 2–0 | 0–1 |
| Dessel | 1–2 | 4–1 | 2–1 | 4–4 | — | 3–1 | 2–0 | 2–0 | 4–0 | 0–0 | 2–1 | 4–2 | 4–0 | 3–1 | 0–0 | 5–1 |
| ASV Geel | 1–1 | 4–1 | 5–1 | 2–4 | 2–2 | — | 3–1 | 2–1 | 1–2 | 1–0 | 4–0 | 1–1 | 1–2 | 2–0 | 0–3 | 2–2 |
| Hamme | 1–2 | 4–1 | 3–2 | 1–3 | 1–3 | 1–4 | — | 1–1 | 1–1 | 3–0 | 1–2 | 3–2 | 2–2 | 4–1 | 0–3 | 1–0 |
| Hasselt | 0–2 | 1–2 | 1–5 | 2–0 | 0–3 | 0–1 | 2–2 | — | 2–2 | 0–0 | 2–0 | 1–0 | 3–3 | 0–0 | 1–2 | 1–1 |
| Heist | 0–1 | 3–0 | 2–2 | 1–3 | 2–0 | 2–1 | 2–0 | 3–0 | — | 0–3 | 4–2 | 2–0 | 1–2 | 5–0 | 3–2 | 5–0 FF (Note: The match between White Star Bruxelles and Oudenaarde of 17 December 2016 was not played as WS Bruxelles had been suspended for unpaid debts. The suspension was lifted on 20 December 2016 but WS Bruxelles lost the match by forfeit. Near the end of March 2017 the team was suspended again, again losing by forfeit, this time to Patro Eisden Maasmechelen.) |
| Oosterzonen | 0–2 | 2–0 | 3–1 | 0–0 | 1–3 | 2–2 | 4–3 | 2–1 | 1–3 | — | 2–0 | 0–0 | 0–2 | 1–1 | 1–2 | 2–0 |
| Oudenaarde | 2–3 | 4–0 | 1–0 | 1–1 | 0–4 | 1–3 | 1–4 | 1–1 | 2–1 | 1–0 | — | 2–0 | 3–2 | 1–1 | 1–2 | 1–1 |
| Patro Eisden Maasmechelen | 0–2 | 1–0 | 0–2 | 0–1 | 0–4 | 3–1 | 3–2 | 2–1 | 0–2 | 1–0 | 0–0 | — | 1–2 | 3–1 | 2–0 | 4–3 |
| Seraing | 0–3 | 3–1 | 0–1 | 1–0 | 1–2 | 0–2 | 3–0 | 0–1 | 1–0 | 2–1 | 1–2 | 3–0 | — | 0–1 | 2–0 | 0–0 |
| Sprimont-Comblain | 0–2 | 2–3 | 1–1 | 1–2 | 1–1 | 1–3 | 2–3 | 0–2 | 2–1 | 1–2 | 0–3 | 2–2 | 1–1 | — | 1–2 | 1–0 |
| Virton | 0–3 | 3–0 | 1–1 | 6–2 | 1–2 | 1–0 | 4–0 | 6–0 | 2–0 | 1–0 | 2–1 | 2–0 | 1–2 | 3–0 | — | 6–1 |
| WS Brussels | 0–4 | 2–2 | 0–2 | 1–2 | 0–1 | 0–1 | 1–1 | 1–0 | 0–1 | 2–0 | 0–5 FF | 0–5 FF | 2–2 | 2–0 | 0–2 | — |

Updated to match(es) played on 25 February 2017. Source: Nationaal : 1st klasse (in Dutch)
Legend: Blue = home team win; Yellow = draw; Red = away team win.

== Promotion play-offs ==
The teams finishing in the top four positions entered the promotion play-offs. The points obtained during the regular season were halved (and rounded up) before the start of the playoff. As Beerschot-Wilrijk were the only team which requested and obtained a licence, they were already certain of promotion even before the start of the playoffs.

| Pos | Team | Pld | W | D | L | GF | GA | GD | Pts | Qualification | B-W | DES | VIR | HEI |
|---|---|---|---|---|---|---|---|---|---|---|---|---|---|---|
| 1 | Beerschot Wilrijk (Note: On 5 April 2017, the Belgian FA announced that Beerschot Wilrijk was the only team which had asked and obtained a Belgian professional football license for the coming season, giving the right to play at the professional levels of Belgian football and necessary to be able to promote from the Belgian First Amateur Division. As a result, Beerschot Wilrijk is already sure of promotion, irrespective of their finishing position.) (P) | 6 | 4 | 1 | 1 | 16 | 7 | +9 | 53 | Promotion to the 2017–18 Belgian First Division B | — | 4–0 | 3–1 | 2–2 |
| 2 | Dessel Sport | 6 | 2 | 2 | 2 | 8 | 11 | −3 | 41 | | 1–2 | — | 0–0 | 2–1 |
| 3 | Virton | 6 | 3 | 1 | 2 | 11 | 10 | +1 | 40 | | 2–0 | 2–3 | — | 3–2 |
| 4 | Heist | 6 | 0 | 2 | 4 | 10 | 17 | −7 | 28 | | 1–5 | 2–2 | 2–3 | — |

Source: Belgian First Amateur Division, Soccerway
Rules for classification: 1) Points; 2) Points without (possible) half points added due to rounding; 3) Matches won; 4) Goal difference; 5) Goals scored; 6) Away goals scored; 7) Away matches won; 8) Play-off.
(P) Promoted

== Number of teams by provinces ==
| Number of teams | Province | Team(s) |
|---|---|---|
| 5 | Antwerp | Beerschot Wilrijk, Dessel Sport, Geel, Heist and Oosterzonen |
| 4 | East Flanders | Dender, Deinze, Hamme and Oudenaarde |
| 2 | Liège | Seraing and Sprimont-Comblain |
| 2 | Limburg | Eisden and Hasselt |
| 1 | Brussels | White Star Bruxelles |
| 1 | Luxembourg | Virton |
| 1 | West Flanders | Coxyde |
