= Colbert Marlot =

French footballer and manager (born 1963)

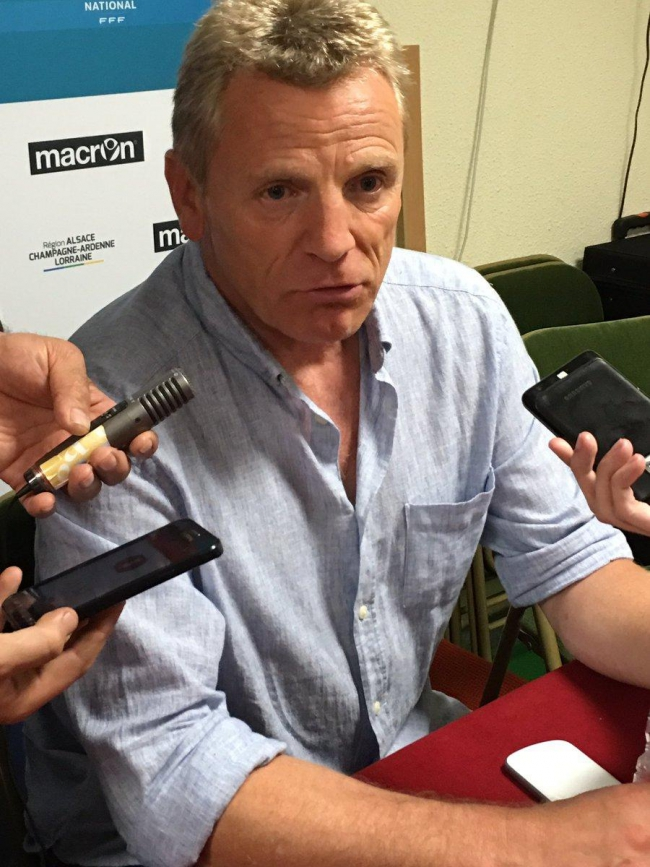

Personal information
- Full name: Colbert Marlot
- Date of birth: 4 March 1963 (age 63)
- Place of birth: Liévin, France
- Height: 1.70 m (5 ft 7 in)
- Position: Defensive midfielder

Senior career*
Years	Team	Apps	(Gls)
1981–1983	Lens	0	(0)
1983–1984	Nice	4	(0)
1984–1987	Limoges	66	(10)
1987–1990	Abbeville	88	(8)
1990–1991	Chamois Niortais	26	(0)
1991–1995	Saint-Leu	116	(0)
1995–1996	Limoges	16	(0)

Managerial career
- 1997–2000: Limoges
- 2000–2001: Brive
- 2001–2002: Lens U16
- 2002–2007: Lens reserves
- 2007–2011: Lens (assistant)
- 2011–2012: Wasquehal
- 2014–2016: Tubize
- 2016: Sedan
- 2018–2019: Limoges
- * Club domestic league appearances and goals

Colbert Marlot (born 4 March 1963) is a former professional footballer who played as a defensive midfielder and is currently head coach at Championnat National 1 team Béziers.
