= K.V.V. Coxyde =

Belgian football club

KVV Coxyde
- Full name: Koninklijke Voetbalvereniging Coxyde
- Founded: 1934
- Dissolved: 2020
- Ground: Henri Housaegerstadion, Koksijde
- Capacity: 2,500

Koninklijke Voetbalvereniging Coxyde was a Belgian football club based in Koksijde, West Flanders. It last played at the ninth and lowest level in Belgian football after the club decided to take a one-year break in 2017–18, vacating its position in the football pyramid (at the third level) to restart at the very bottom in 2018–19 where it remained for two seasons before merging with K.V.V. Oostduinkerke in 2020 to form K.V.V. Koksijde-Oostduinkerke. This club continues under the matricule number of Oostduinkerke, with the number and history of Koksijde being scrapped from the records.

== History ==
The club was founded in 1934 and it registered a few months later with the Belgian FA, coincidentally receiving the matricule number 1934. It spent the first 74 years playing in the provincial divisions, until it won promotion to the Belgian Fourth Division in 2008 and to the Third Division next year via winning their group, despite the sudden passing of their coach Jan Merlevede while in the middle of their first season in the national leagues.

The club's first season in the third tier was an impressive one, finishing 6th out of 19. In 2010 they finished 4th out of 18 but declined to apply for a professional football license and so were excluded from the promotion playoffs. In 2012 the club, despite finishing 7th, was deducted 20 points for fielding an unregistered player, sending them down to 16th place; it had to contest test matches. which by winning the third round it won a spot for next season. Another three seasons had passed and the club won their division of the third tier in 2015, earning them their first ever promotion to the second division, led by such players as Nicholas Tamsin. After finishing bottom of the table, the club immediately relegated back to the third level and would have been relegated another level following the 2016–17 season, but instead decided to stop playing for one season to restart at the lowest level of Belgian football in 2018. There it played for two seasons, before merging into K.V.V. Oostduinkerke in 2020 to form K.V.V. Koksijde-Oostduinkerke.

== Honours ==
- Belgian Third Division
  - Champions: 2015
- Belgian Fourth Division
  - Champions: 2009
