= Frederik Vanderbiest =

Belgian football manager and former player

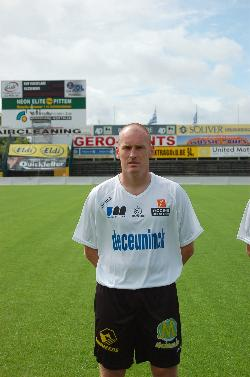

Personal information
- Date of birth: 10 October 1977 (age 49)
- Place of birth: Vilvoorde, Belgium
- Height: 1.80 m (5 ft 11 in)
- Position: Midfielder

Team information
- Current team: KV Mechelen (head coach)

Youth career
- 1983–1997: RWDM

Senior career*
Years	Team	Apps	(Gls)
1997–1998	RWDM		
1998–1999	Walhain		
1999–2000	Union SG		
2000–2001	RWDM		
2001–2007	Roeselare		
2008–2009	Dender		
2008–2009	→ OH Leuven (loan)		
2009–2011	Oostende		

Managerial career
- 2010–2015: Oostende
- 2015–2016: Cercle Brugge
- 2016: Antwerp
- 2016–2017: Aris Limassol
- 2017: Lierse
- 2017–2018: Roeselare (assistant)
- 2018–2019: KV Mechelen (assistant)
- 2019–2020: RWDM47
- 2020–2025: KV Mechelen (assistant)
- 2023: KV Mechelen (caretaker)
- 2025: KV Mechelen (caretaker)
- 2025–: KV Mechelen
- * Club domestic league appearances and goals

Frederik Vanderbiest (born 10 October 1977) is a Belgian football manager and former player who is currently the head coach of KV Mechelen.

Vanderbiest spent his entire career in Belgium, making around 260 professional matches during his career. After his retirement, he became a manager and assistant coach, managing in Belgium and Cyprus. He was assistant coach at KV Mechelen for 5 years before taking the managerial role permanently in 2025, taking the club to the Champions' Playoffs for the first time in the club's history.

== Career ==
Born in Vilvoorde, Belgium, Vanderbiest began playing football in R.W.D. Molenbeek's youth system before he joined the senior side. He played for K.S.V. Roeselare from 2001 to 2007, where he was twice voted player of the year by the club's supporters.

In 2013, he guided K.V. Oostende into the quarter-finals of the Belgian Cup and won promotion to the Belgian Pro League by winning the 2012–13 Belgian Second Division.

== Managerial career ==
He started his coaching career as an assistant coach at Roeselare, where he worked as assistant coach to Dennis van Wijk.

He was head coach of Oostende, Cercle Brugge, Antwerp, Limassol and Lierse, but describes those managerial stints as stints that "went badly".

In 2019, he joined RWDM Brussels as manager at request of Thierry Dailly.

He has a close friendship with Besnik Hasi, who wanted Vanderbiest to join him at R.S.C. Anderlecht, but Vanderbiest's negotiations with Mechelen had progressed too far.

After Besnik Hasi was sacked from Mechelen in March 2025, Vanderbiest took over as caretaker manager.

On 15 March 2026, Vanderbiest led K.V. Mechelen to the Champions Playoffs for the first time in the club's history.
