= Kinesiotherapy =

Treatment of disease by muscular movement

- Specialty: Physical therapy

Kinesiotherapy or Kinesitherapy or kinesiatrics (kinēsis, "movement"), literally "movement therapy", is the therapeutic treatment of disease by passive and active muscular movements (as by massage) and of exercise. It is the core element of physiotherapy/physical therapy.

Equivalents of the term "kinesiotherapy" are used in place of the term "physiotherapy" or "physical therapy" in several non-English speaking countries (e.g. Bulgaria, Lithuania, Rwanda, Luxembourg, Mauritius, Belgium, France, Chile, Paraguay, and Romania).

== History ==
Healing gymnastic movement exercises can be traced back to the time around 2500 BC in China. The Greek physician Soran, who worked in Rome, described exercise methods with traction and countertraction using constructions with belts and pulleys to alleviate symptoms of limb paralysis in the second century AD. It has been used as a well-established therapeutical resource since the early 20th century. Back then, various devices were used, including vibrating devices to stimulate the muscles. One of the first people in modern times to devise and build mechanical aids for therapeutic gymnastics was Karl Heinrich Klingert from Breslau. In 1810, he published a device similar to today's rehabilitation equipment (shake weight). It could be used to exercise arms and legs simultaneously.

== Methods ==
Movement disorders have a huge variety of clinical shades, so a kinesitherapist should have the widest possible range of methods and be able to apply them in practice, directly in rehabilitation treatment. A wide variety of movements are used in kinesitherapy, classified as active-passive, voluntary, synergistic, assisted, trick movements, performed actively and passively, with the help of a kinesitherapist or mechanotherapy.

Some methods of kinesitherapy involve guiding the patient through painful physiological adaptive reactions that arise with the inevitable forceful impact on the muscles of the musculoskeletal system affected by the disease. The duty of the patient using these techniques is to actively overcome the pain. It is assumed that in this way a new behavioral stereotype is formed, inherent in a healthy person who is not afraid and does not depend on the manifestations of the disease.
