= Dennis van Wijk =

Dutch footballer (born 1962)

Personal information
- Full name: Dennis Johannes van Wijk
- Date of birth: 16 December 1962 (age 63)
- Place of birth: Oostzaan, Netherlands
- Height: 1.75 m (5 ft 9 in)
- Position: Defender

Youth career
- 1968–1981: De Volewijckers

Senior career*
Years	Team	Apps	(Gls)
1981–1982	Ajax		
1982–1986	Norwich City		
1986–1989	Club Brugge	87	(5)
1989–1990	Ajax		
1990–1991	PAS Giannina		
1991–1992	Club Brugge		
1993–1995	Knokke		

Managerial career
- 1994–1996: Knokke
- 1996–1998: KV Oostende
- 1998: Daring Blankenberge
- 1998–2002: Cercle Brugge
- 2003–2006: Roeselare
- 2006–2007: Willem II
- 2007: KV Oostende
- 2007–2008: Sint-Truiden
- 2008–2010: Roeselare
- 2011–2012: Mons
- 2012: Charleroi
- 2012–2013: Antwerp
- 2013–2014: Westerlo
- 2015: Cercle Brugge
- 2015: Deinze
- 2016: Beerschot Wilrijk
- 2017: OH Leuven
- 2017–2018: Roeselare
- 2018: KV Mechelen
- 2020: KV Oostende
- * Club domestic league appearances and goals

Dennis Johannes van Wijk (Dutch pronunciation: [ˈdɛnɪ ɕoːˈɦɑnəs fɑɱ ˈʋɛik]; (Note: In isolation, Dennis, Johannes and van are pronounced [ˈdɛnɪs], [joːˈɦɑnəs] and [vɑn], respectively.) born 16 December 1962) is a Dutch football player and coach.

Van Wijk was a left-back who began his career in the youth system of Ajax. He was unable to break into the first team and joined Norwich City in 1982. He spent four years at Carrow Road and was a member of the Norwich teams that won the English League Cup in 1985 and the Second Division Championship in 1986. In that 1985 final, Van Wijk conceded a penalty kick when he handled in the area. To the relief of Van Wijk and Norwich, Clive Walker of Sunderland missed the penalty and Norwich won 1–0.

After leaving Norwich, Van Wijk played for a series of teams until 1995. He won the Belgian League championship and Belgian Supercup with Club Brugge. After having managed several Belgium teams since 1995, he became manager of Willem II Tilburg in the Netherlands in 2006. On 4 November 2007, he left the club due to bad performances of the team.

Van Wijk is the son of former professional footballer Hassie van Wijk.

== Playing career ==
- 1968–1981 De Volewijckers (Netherlands)
- 1981–1982 Ajax (Netherlands)
- 1982–1986 Norwich City (England)
- 1986–1989 Club Brugge (Belgium)
- 1989–1990 Ajax (Netherlands)
- 1990–1991 PAS Giannina (Greece)
- 1991–1992 Club Brugge (Belgium)
- 1993–1994 Knokke (Belgium)

== Managerial career ==
- 1994–1995 Knokke (player-manager) (Belgium)
- 1995–1996 Knokke (manager) (Belgium)
- 1996–10/1998 KV Oostende (Belgium)
- 10–11/1998 Daring Blankenberge (Belgium)
- 11/1998–2002 Cercle Brugge (Belgium)
- 2003–2006 Roeselare (Belgium)
- 2006–2007 Willem II Tilburg (Netherlands)
- 2007 KV Oostende (Belgium)
- 2007–2008 Sint-Truiden (Belgium)
- 2008–2010 Roeselare (Belgium)
- 2011–2012 Mons (Belgium)
- 2012 Charleroi (Belgium)
- 2012–2013 Antwerp (Belgium)
- 2013–2014 Westerlo (Belgium)
- 2015–2016 Cercle Brugge (Belgium)
- 2016 Beerschot Wilrijk (Belgium)
- 2017 OH Leuven (Belgium)
- 2017–2018 Roeselare (Belgium)
- 2018– KV Mechelen (Belgium)

== Honours ==
Norwich City

- Football League Cup: 1984–85

== Sources ==
- Davage, Mark; Eastwood, John; Platt, Kevin (2001). Canary Citizens. Jarrold Publishing. ISBN 0-7117-2020-7.
