= 2019–20 in Belgian football =

Football in Belgium
- Season: 2019–20

Men's football
- First Division A: Club Brugge
- First Division B: Beerschot
- First Amateur Division: Deinze
- Second Amateur Division: Knokke (VFV A), Tienen (VFV B) and Francs Borains (ACFF)
- Third Amateur Division: Zelzate (VFV A), Lyra-Lierse Berlaar (VFV B), Ganshoren (ACFF A) and R.F.C. Warnant (ACFF B)
- Cup: Antwerp
- Super Cup: Genk

The following article is a summary of the 2019–20 football season in Belgium, which was the 117th season of competitive football in the country and ran from July 2019 until August 2020.

== National teams ==
=== Belgium national football team ===
After starting with four wins out of four during the previous season, Belgium continued its stroll through UEFA Euro 2020 qualifying Group I, also winning all remaining six matches and thereby qualifying for UEFA Euro 2020 with a perfect record. The tournament itself was however postponed to 2021 due to the COVID-19 pandemic in Europe. and both the preparation matches against Portugal and Switzerland in March which were to be held in Qatar as well as two other matches in June against opponents which were still to be announced, were cancelled.

==== UEFA Euro 2020 qualifying ====
Pos	Team	Pld	W	D	L	GF	GA	GD	Pts	Qualification	(Belgium)	(Russia)	(Scotland)	(Cyprus)	(Kazakhstan)	(San Marino)
1	Belgium	10	10	0	0	40	3	+37	30	Qualify for final tournament	—	3–1	3–0	6–1	3–0	9–0
2	Russia	10	8	0	2	33	8	+25	24	Qualify for final tournament	1–4	—	4–0	1–0	1–0	9–0
3	Scotland	10	5	0	5	16	19	−3	15	Advance to play-offs via Nations League	0–4	1–2	—	2–1	3–1	6–0
4	Cyprus	10	3	1	6	15	20	−5	10 (Note: Head-to-head points: Cyprus 4, Kazakhstan 1.)		0–2	0–5	1–2	—	1–1	5–0
5	Kazakhstan	10	3	1	6	13	17	−4	10		0–2	0–4	3–0	1–2	—	4–0
6	San Marino	10	0	0	10	1	51	−50	0		0–4	0–5	0–2	0–4	1–3	—

Source: UEFA
Rules for classification: Qualification tiebreakers
Notes:

6 September 2019	San Marino	0–4	Belgium	San Marino Stadium, Serravalle
20:45		Report	Batshuayi 43' (pen.), 90+2'; Mertens 57'; Chadli 63'	Attendance: 2,523; Referee: Horațiu Feșnic (Romania)

9 September 2019	Scotland	0–4	Belgium	Hampden Park, Glasgow
20:45 (19:45 UTC+1)		Report	Lukaku 9'; Vermaelen 24'; Alderweireld 32'; De Bruyne 82'	Attendance: 25,524; Referee: Paweł Gil (Poland)

10 October 2019	Belgium	9–0	San Marino	King Baudouin Stadium, Brussels
20:45	Lukaku 28', 41'; Chadli 31'; Brolli 35' (o.g.); Alderweireld 43'; Tielemans 45+1'; Benteke 79'; Verschaeren 84' (pen.); Castagne 90'	Report		Attendance: 34,504; Referee: Anastasios Papapetrou (Greece)

13 October 2019	Kazakhstan	0–2	Belgium	Astana Arena, Nur-Sultan
15:00 (19:00 UTC+6)		Report	Batshuayi 21'; Meunier 53'	Attendance: 26,801; Referee: Gediminas Mažeika (Lithuania)

16 November 2019	Russia	1–4	Belgium	Krestovsky Stadium, Saint Petersburg
18:00 (20:00 UTC+3)	Dzhikiya 79'	Report	T. Hazard 19'; E. Hazard 33', 40'; Lukaku 72'	Referee: Artur Soares Dias (Portugal)

19 November 2019	Belgium	6–1	Cyprus	King Baudouin Stadium, Brussels
20:45	Benteke 16', 68'; De Bruyne 36', 41'; Carrasco 44'; Christoforou 51' (o.g.)	Report	N. Ioannou 14'	Referee: Jørgen Burchardt (Denmark)

==== UEFA Euro 2020 ====
Belgium was to play Denmark, Finland and Russia in Group B in June 2020, however all matches were postponed to 2021.

==== Friendlies ====
Four friendlies were to be played in preparation for the UEFA Euro 2020 tournament, the first two would have been played in March in Qatar against Portugal and Switzerland, while the two others were scheduled for June, with the opponents still unknown. Eventually, all matches were cancelled due to the COVID-19 pandemic in Europe.

2020-03-27 Friendly	Belgium	Cancelled	Portugal	Doha
				Stadium: Education City Stadium

2020-03-30 Friendly	Belgium	Cancelled	Switzerland	Doha
				Stadium: Education City Stadium

2020-06-TBA Friendly	Belgium	Cancelled	TBA

2020-06-TBA Friendly	Belgium	Cancelled	TBA

=== Belgium women's national football team ===
Qualification for the UEFA Women's Euro 2021 started perfect for the Belgians with four straight wins, with also Switzerland holding the maximum after four games. A few weeks before the crucial match between the joint-leaders, all remaining matches were postponed to the following season, due to the COVID-19 pandemic in Europe. The UEFA Women's Euro 2021 tournament was pushed back a year to become the UEFA Women's Euro 2021, to avoid coinciding with both the 2020 Summer Olympics and UEFA Euro 2020. Meanwhile, the team did compete in the 2020 Algarve Cup, reaching 6th place out of 8 teams, while two other friendlies were cancelled.

==== UEFA Women's Euro 2021 qualifying ====
Pos	Team	Pld	W	D	L	GF	GA	GD	Pts	Qualification	Belgium	Switzerland	Romania	Croatia	Lithuania
1	Belgium	8	7	0	1	37	5	+32	21	Final tournament	—	4–0	6–1	6–1	6–0
2	Switzerland	8	6	1	1	20	6	+14	19	Play-offs	2–1	—	6–0	2–0	4–0
3	Romania	8	4	0	4	13	16	−3	12		0–1	0–2	—	4–1	3–0
4	Croatia	8	2	1	5	7	19	−12	7		1–4	1–1	0–1	—	1–0
5	Lithuania	8	0	0	8	1	32	−31	0		0–9	0–3	0–4	1–2	—

Source: UEFA
Rules for classification: Tiebreakers

3 September 2019	Belgium	6–1	Croatia	Den Dreef, Leuven
20:30	Cayman 18', 59', 66'; De Caigny 44'; Deloose 74'; Vanmechelen 78'	Report	Lojna 84'	Attendance: 3,344; Referee: Henrikke Nervik (Norway)

8 October 2019	Romania	0–1	Belgium	Stadionul Dr. Constantin Rădulescu, Cluj-Napoca
17:30 (18:30 EEST)		Report	De Neve 9'	Attendance: 1,073; Referee: Marta Huerta De Aza (Spain)

8 November 2019	Croatia	1–4	Belgium	Stadion ŠRC Zaprešić, Zaprešić
18:00	Lubina 40'	Report	Wullaert 15' (pen.); Philtjens 31', 56'; De Caigny 81'	Attendance: 357; Referee: Tess Olofsson (Sweden)

12 November 2019	Belgium	6–0	Lithuania	Den Dreef, Leuven
20:30	De Caigny 14', 32', 46', 66', 73'; Mikutaitė 29' (o.g.)	Report		Attendance: 4,587; Referee: Ivana Projkovska (North Macedonia)

14 April 2020	Belgium	Postponed	Switzerland
		Report

9 June 2020	Lithuania	Postponed	Belgium
(EEST)		Report

==== Friendlies ====
29 August 2019 Friendly	Belgium	3–3	England	Den Dreef, Leuven
21:00 (UTC+1)	Telford 38' (o.g.); Van Kerkhoven 45+2', 55'	Report	Taylor 22'; Mead 26'; Parris 75' (pen.)	Referee: Gyöngyi Gaál (Hungary)

4 March 2020 2020 Algarve Cup	New Zealand	1–1 (7–6 p)	Belgium	Parchal, Portugal
18:00	Chance 37'	Report	Velde 89'	Stadium: Bela Vista Municipal Stadium
	Penalties
	Bowen (penalty scored); Gregorius (penalty scored); Stott (penalty scored); White (penalty scored); Moore (penalty scored); Bott (penalty missed); Longo (penalty scored); Cleverley (penalty scored)		(penalty scored) De Caigny; (penalty scored) Vanhaevermaet; (penalty scored) Cayman; (penalty scored) Evrard; (penalty scored) Wullaert; (penalty missed) Deloose; (penalty scored) De Neve; (penalty missed) Wijnants

7 March 2020 2020 Algarve Cup	Portugal	0–1	Belgium	Parchal, Portugal
17:00		Report	De Caigny 65'	Stadium: Bela Vista Municipal Stadium

10 March 2020 2020 Algarve Cup	Belgium	0–4	Denmark	Lagos, Portugal
7:30			Harder 6'; Thomsen 13'; Christiansen 40'; Pedersen 47'	Stadium: Lagos Municipal Stadium

9 April 2020 Friendly	Belgium	Cancelled	Norway

5 June 2020 Friendly	Netherlands	Cancelled	Belgium	Rat Verlegh Stadion, Breda

=== Belgium national under-21 football team ===
The U21 started their 2021 UEFA European Under-21 Championship qualifying campaign and were scheduled to play their first five matches. However the final match against Bosnia-Herzegovina was postponed to the following season due to COVID-19.

==== 2021 UEFA European Under-21 Championship qualification ====
Pos	Team	Pld	W	D	L	GF	GA	GD	Pts	Qualification	Germany	Belgium	Bosnia and Herzegovina	Wales	Moldova
1	Germany	8	6	0	2	22	10	+12	18	Final tournament	—	2–3	1–0	2–1	4–1
2	Belgium	8	4	1	3	18	9	+9	13		4–1	—	0–0	5–0	4–1
3	Bosnia and Herzegovina	8	3	2	3	9	7	+2	11		0–2	3–2	—	1–0	4–0
4	Wales	8	3	0	5	8	15	−7	9		1–5	1–0	1–0	—	3–0
5	Moldova	8	2	1	5	6	22	−16	7		0–5	1–0	1–1	2–1	—

Source: UEFA
Rules for classification: Tiebreakers

6 September 2019	Wales	1–0	Belgium	Racecourse Ground, Wrexham
18:00 (17:00 BST)	Johnson 3'	Report		Attendance: 304; Referee: Danilo Grujić (Serbia)

10 September 2019	Belgium	0–0	Bosnia and Herzegovina	Den Dreef, Leuven
20:00		Report		Attendance: 823; Referee: Volen Chinkov (Bulgaria)

15 October 2019	Belgium	4–1	Moldova	Den Dreef, Leuven
20:00	Openda 9'; Antonucci 29'; Vanheusden 76'; Doku 90+1' (pen.)	Report	Cojocaru 33'	Attendance: 886; Referee: Kaspar Sjöberg (Sweden)

17 November 2019	Germany	2–3	Belgium	Schwarzwald-Stadion, Freiburg
16:00	Schlotterbeck 38'; Vanheusden 81' (o.g.)	Report	Vanheusden 26'; Openda 43', 70'	Attendance: 16,504; Referee: Fábio José Costa Veríssimo (Portugal)

31 March 2020	Bosnia and Herzegovina	Postponed	Belgium
		Report

=== Belgium national under-19 football team ===
The U19 took part in the 2020 UEFA European Under-19 Championship qualifying campaign. The team easily passed the qualifying round, moving into the elite round, before the tournament was cancelled entirely and qualification was stopped.

==== 2020 UEFA European Under-19 Championship qualification ====
===== Qualifying round =====
Pos	Team	Pld	W	D	L	GF	GA	GD	Pts	Qualification
1	Belgium (H)	3	3	0	0	6	1	+5	9	Elite round
2	Iceland	3	2	0	1	9	7	+2	6	Elite round
3	Greece	3	1	0	2	7	7	0	3	
4	Albania	3	0	0	3	4	11	−7	0	

Source: UEFA
Rules for classification: Qualification tiebreakers
(H) Hosts

13 November 2019	Iceland	0–3	Belgium	Sportpark Tessenderlo, Tessenderlo
14:30		Report	De Ketelaere 19'; Raskin 42'; Colassin 85'	Referee: Vitali Meshkov (Russia)

16 November 2019	Belgium	2–1	Albania	Luminus Arena Stadium B, Genk
19:30	Van Der Brempt 10'; De Ketelaere 45+1'	Report	Broja 76'	Referee: Vitali Meshkov (Russia)

19 November 2019	Belgium	1–0	Greece	Gemeentelijk Sportstadion, Maasmechelen
14:30	Cuypers 90+3'	Report		Referee: Kevin Clancy (Scotland)

===== Elite Round =====
Pos	Team	Pld	W	D	L	GF	GA	GD	Pts	Qualification
1	Spain (H)	0	0	0	0	0	0	0	0	Final tournament
2	Belgium	0	0	0	0	0	0	0	0	
3	Bulgaria	0	0	0	0	0	0	0	0	
4	North Macedonia	0	0	0	0	0	0	0	0	

First match(es) will be played: 25 March 2020. Source: UEFA
Rules for classification: Qualification tiebreakers
(H) Hosts

25 March 2020	Bulgaria	Cancelled	Belgium
		Report

28 March 2020	Belgium	Cancelled	North Macedonia
		Report

31 March 2020	Belgium	Cancelled	Spain
		Report

==== Friendlies ====
8 August 2019 SBS Cup	Japan	2–0	Belgium	Fujieda Soccer Stadium, Fujieda
	Oda 30'; Fujio 54'

9 August 2019 SBS Cup	Belgium	1–5	Colombia	Fujieda Soccer Stadium, Fujieda
	Cuypers 52'		Mosquera 21', 34'; Valencia 40'; García 65'; Arroyo 80+6'

11 August 2019 SBS Cup	Shizuoka U-18 Selection	2–2 (3–4 p)	Belgium	Fujieda Soccer Stadium, Fujieda
	Noriega 25'; Uenaka 54'		Cuypers 30'; Suray 38'

== Men's football ==
=== League season ===
==== Promotion and relegation ====
The following teams had achieved promotion or suffered relegation going into the 2019–20 season.

League	Promoted to league	Relegated from league
First Division A	KV Mechelen	Lokeren
First Division B	Virton	Tubize
First Division Amateur Division	La Louvière Centre; Sint-Eloois-Winkel; Patro Eisden Maasmechelen; Visé	Aalst; Geel; Knokke; Oudenaarde
Second Division Amateur Division	Givry; Merelbeke; Namur Fosses; Onhaye; Pepingen-Halle; Stockay-Warfusée; Tienen; Verlaine; Zwevezele	Brakel; Ciney; City Pirates; Eppegem; Heur-Tongeren; Overijse; Turnhout; Wallonia Walhain
Third Division Amateur Division	Beringen; Gosselies; Habay; Jodoigne; Kosova Schaerbeek; Linden; Lochristi; Ninove; Oostnieuwkerke; Pont-à-Celles-Buzet; Raeren-Eynatten; Rochefort; Saint-Ghislain; Spy; Witgoor	Binche; Condruzien; Kampenhout; Leopoldsburg; Longlier; Racing Mechelen; Nijlen; Oostkamp; Stockel; Tamines; Ternesse; Union La Calamine; Wervik; Woluwe-Zaventem

==== Coronavirus impact & License troubles ====
Due to the COVID-19 pandemic in Belgium, all professional matches were postponed mid-March. A few weeks later the board of directors of the Belgian Pro League proposed to cancel permanently all remaining matches, take the standings as of March 12 counting as final and award the title to Club Brugge, with the proposal to be accepted at the general meeting on 15 May 2020. UEFA criticized the decision to stop the competition early, threatening to not allow any Belgian clubs to take part in the 2020–21 UEFA Champions League and 2020–21 UEFA Europa League unless they tried everything possible to complete as many matches as possible before the extended deadline of early August. In the amateur leagues, all remaining matches were canceled as well, and points of teams that had played fewer matches were scaled up before completing the final standings, while all playoff matches were canceled and only direct promotions and relegations were carried out.

Despite stopping all matches in both the 2019–20 Belgian First Division A and 2019–20 Belgian First Division B, several unresolved issues remain, which were to be solved by a group of experts to come with a proposal by mid-May:

- Which team will relegate from the Belgian First Division A? Last place Waasland-Beveren was only two points behind Oostende and thus mathematically had a chance to avoid relegation with one match to play.
- Which team will promote from the Belgian First Division B? Period champions Oud-Heverlee Leuven and Beerschot should have played a two-legged promotion playoff to determine the champion, but had only completed the first leg at the time the outbreak occurred.
- What to do with the 2020 Belgian Cup Final? Club Brugge and Antwerp were to play the final on 22 March 2020.

The easiest solution would involve having no relegation and allowing both Oud-Heverlee Leuven and Beerschot to be promoted, playing one season with 18 teams without playoffs. Meanwhile, the 2020 Belgian Super Cup (scheduled to be played towards the end of July) could be canceled, with the cup final to be played on that date instead. While many clubs seemed to support this proposal, no final consensus was reached in the months of March and April, as the general meeting was postponed several times.

To complicate matters further, on 8 April 2020, the license commission decided not to award a professional football license to no less than seven (of 24) professional clubs, nearly always for insufficient proof of financial solvency. This included three teams from the 2019–20 Belgian First Division A (Standard Liège, Excel Mouscron and Oostende) and four from the 2019–20 Belgian First Division B (Lokeren, Lommel, Roeselare and Virton). All seven clubs appealed the decision at the Belgian Court for Sports Arbitrage, but only Standard Liège, Excel Mouscron, Oostende, and Lommel were awarded a license while Lokeren went bankrupt and ceased to exist and both Roeselare and Virton were refused a license and thereby forced to relegate. As a result, there are only 21 professional teams left, meaning more than just one team will need to be promoted from the 2019–20 Belgian First Amateur Division. In that division, only had two teams received a professional football license (Deinze and RWDM47) at first instance, but eventually, the appeals of Seraing and Lierse Kempenzonen were upheld, meaning there are four eligible teams.

In the days before the decision by the general meeting, several clubs sent around their proposal with their vision on how the season should come to an end, with opinions differing hugely:

- On 10 May 2020, league leaders Club Brugge (who are against the playoff system) proposed to stop the season with the standings as final. Waasland-Beveren would be spared of relegation while both Beerschot and OH Leuven would be promoted and the 2020–21 Belgian First Division A would thus be played with 18 teams, without playoffs. In their proposal, the cup final would be played on 1 or 2 August and newly signed players would be allowed.
- On 11 May 2020, Standard Liège (who would prefer keeping the playoff system) reacted by stating that there needed to be consistency in the decisions and it would be unfair to declare a champion but have no relegation. Hence they insisted Waasland-Beveren be relegated and the promotion play-off between Beerschot and OH Leuven to be played without supporters and if needed at a neutral venue to decide the promoting team. The club also hoped the Belgian Cup final could still be completed before the end of the season.
- On 12 May 2020, Genk agreed to extend the league to 18 teams (as per the proposal of Club Brugge), but also proposed to create a new playoff system, in which after completion of the regular season, the top four teams playoff for the title while teams five through eight play off for the remaining European ticket. In case the coronavirus reemerges, they propose to end the season after 34 matchdays and take those standings as final. They also insist that the current league format should be reinstated as from the 2021–22 season, meaning there would be three teams relegating from the 2020–21 Belgian First Division A. Genk also stated that in case there would be no agreement to stop the current season (80% of votes needed), to declare the current season void (50% of votes needed), which would imply no champion, no relegations and promotions.
- On 14 May 2020, in preparation for the general meeting of the next day, the group of experts came to a new proposal to be approved at the general meeting, which involved canceling all remaining matches, taking the standings as final with Club Brugge crowned as champions. The 2020–21 Belgian First Division A season will have shortened playoffs, but most importantly will still contain 16 teams, meaning that Waasland-Beveren would be relegated. To determine the team to be promoted, Oud-Heverlee Leuven and Beerschot need to attempt to play the return leg of the promotion playoff. If they cannot complete the match before the deadline, Westerlo would be promoted instead as the team which obtained the most points during the regular season. There will also be an attempt to complete the 2020 Belgian Cup Final before the deadline of August 3 as set by UEFA.

==== Belgian First Division A ====
===== Regular season =====
Pos	Team	Pld	W	D	L	GF	GA	GD	Pts	Qualification or relegation
1	Club Brugge (C)	29	21	7	1	58	14	+44	70	Qualification for the Champions League group stage
2	Gent	29	16	7	6	59	34	+25	55	Qualification for the Champions League third qualifying round
3	Charleroi	29	15	9	5	49	23	+26	54	Qualification for the Europa League third qualifying round
4	Antwerp (Y)	29	15	8	6	49	32	+17	53	Qualification for the Europa League group stage (Note: Antwerp qualified for the Europa League group stage as the 2019–20 Belgian Cup winners.)
5	Standard Liège	29	14	7	8	47	32	+15	49	Qualification for the Europa League second qualifying round
6	Mechelen	29	13	5	11	46	43	+3	44	
7	Genk	29	13	5	11	45	42	+3	44	
8	Anderlecht	29	11	10	8	45	29	+16	43	
9	Zulte Waregem	29	10	6	13	41	49	−8	36	
10	Excel Mouscron	29	9	9	11	38	40	−2	36	
11	Kortrijk	29	9	6	14	40	44	−4	33	
12	Sint-Truiden	29	9	6	14	36	53	−17	33	
13	Eupen	29	8	6	15	28	51	−23	30	
14	Cercle Brugge	29	7	2	20	27	54	−27	23	
15	Oostende	29	6	4	19	29	58	−29	22	
16	Waasland-Beveren (Note: Waasland-Beveren would have been relegated due to finishing last, however following legal proceedings the Belgian Pro League eventually voted in favour of expanding the 2020–21 Belgian First Division A to 18 teams, meaning Waasland-Beveren was spared and both OH Leuven and Beerschot were promoted from the 2019–20 Belgian First Division B.) (T)	29	5	5	19	21	60	−39	20	Reprieved from relegation

Source: Belgian First Division A (in Dutch), Soccerway
Rules for classification: 1) Points; 2) Matches won; 3) Goal difference; 4) Goals scored; 5) Away goals scored; 6) Away matches won; 7) Play-off.
(C) Champions; (T) Reprieved; (Y) Croky Cup winner

==== Belgian First Division B ====
Pos	Team	Pld	W	D	L	GF	GA	GD	Pts	Qualification
1	Westerlo	28	15	4	9	45	30	+15	49	
2	Virton (Note: On 12 May 2020, Virton were refused both a professional football license and a remunerated football license, meaning they were relegated two levels, to the 2020–21 Belgian Second Amateur Division.) (R)	28	14	5	9	44	26	+18	47	Relegation to 2020–21 Belgian Second Amateur Division
3	OH Leuven (Q)	28	14	4	10	45	40	+5	46	Qualification to Promotion play-offs
4	Union SG	28	11	12	5	43	32	+11	45	
5	Beerschot (Q)	28	12	7	9	31	32	−1	43	Qualification to Promotion play-offs
6	Lommel	28	6	9	13	21	37	−16	27	
7	Roeselare (Note: On 11 May 2020, Roeselare were refused a professional football license, meaning they were relegated to the 2020–21 Belgian First Amateur Division.) (R)	28	5	11	12	37	54	−17	26	Relegation to 2020–21 Belgian First Amateur Division
8	Lokeren (Note: Lokeren went bankrupt and ceased to exist.) (R)	28	4	8	16	24	49	−25	20	Folded as a team following bankruptcy

Source: Belgian First Division B (in French and Dutch)
Rules for classification: 1) Points; 2) Matches won; 3) Goal difference; 4) Goals scored; 5) Away goals scored; 6) Away matches won; 7) Play-off.
(Q) Qualified for the phase indicated; (R) Relegated

==== Belgian First Amateur Division ====
Pos	Team	Pld	W	D	L	GF	GA	GD	Pts	Qualification or relegation
1	Deinze (Note: Eligible for promotion. The deadline for requesting a license for professional football of mid-February revealed that only six teams (Deinze, La Louvière Centre, Lierse Kempenzonen, Patro Eisden Maasmechelen, RWDM47 and Seraing) had applied. Only four of those actually obtained the license. Due to one club dissolving (Lokeren) and two clubs being refused a license (Roeselare and Virton), two extra teams were promoted, the two highest finishers: Seraing and RWDM47. Eventually on 31 July 2020 it was decided that the Belgian First Division A would expand to 18 teams, meaning no team would relegate from, while two teams would be promoted into this division. As a result, two more spots opened up in the 2020–21 Belgian First Division B, which went to Lierse Kempenzonen (highest finisher with license) and the Club Brugge U23 squad.) (C, P)	24	20	2	2	52	16	+36	62	Promotion for the First Division B
2	Tessenderlo	24	12	6	6	32	23	+9	42	
3	Seraing (P)	23	11	7	5	42	27	+15	41.74 (Note: As both Seraing and RFC Liège had played one match less, their points were scaled up by a factor 24/23.)	Promotion for the First Division B
4	Heist	24	11	5	8	28	23	+5	38	
5	Patro Eisden Maasmechelen	24	10	6	8	25	23	+2	36	
6	RWDM47 (P)	24	9	7	8	26	25	+1	34	Promotion for the First Division B
7	Dender EH	24	8	7	9	36	34	+2	31	
8	Dessel	24	8	7	9	29	29	0	31	
9	Rupel Boom	24	7	10	7	35	32	+3	31	
10	Olympic Charleroi CF	24	8	6	10	29	33	−4	30	
11	Visé	24	7	9	8	32	36	−4	30	
12	RFC Liège	23	6	9	8	30	37	−7	28.17	
13	Lierse Kempenzonen (P)	24	7	5	12	27	30	−3	26	Promotion for the First Division B
14	La Louvière Centre (Note: Both La Louvière Centre and Sint-Eloois Winkel were spared of relegation despite finishing in the relegation positions, due to Lokeren being dissolved and Virton being refused a license for the first Amateur Division.)	24	6	8	10	36	49	−13	26	
15	Tubize (Note: Tubize did not meet all the criteria to obtain a license and was penalized with a 3-point penalty for next season (in the Belgian Second Amateur Division).) (R)	24	6	5	13	19	40	−21	23	Relegation to the Second Amateur Division
16	Sint-Eloois-Winkel	24	2	7	15	21	42	−21	13	

Source: vbal4
Rules for classification: 1) Points; 2) Matches won; 3) Goal difference; 4) Goals scored; 5) Away matches won; 6) Goal difference in away matches; 7) Away goals scored.
(C) Champions; (P) Promoted; (R) Relegated

==== Belgian Second Amateur Division ====
===== Division A =====
Pos	Team	Pld	W	D	L	GF	GA	GD	Pts	Qualification or relegation
1	Knokke (C, P)	24	20	3	1	57	15	+42	63	Promotion to the 2020–21 Belgian First Amateur Division
2	Mandel United (P)	24	14	3	7	51	31	+20	45	Promotion to the 2020–21 Belgian First Amateur Division
3	Ronse	24	14	3	7	42	26	+16	45	
4	Oudenaarde	24	13	3	8	54	46	+8	42	
5	Gent-Zeehaven	24	12	5	7	36	29	+7	41	
6	Petegem	24	11	6	7	51	39	+12	39	
7	Gullegem	24	11	6	7	36	32	+4	39	
8	Zwevezele	24	11	5	8	41	28	+13	38	
9	Harelbeke	24	10	5	9	30	35	−5	35	
10	Dikkelvenne	24	9	4	11	35	37	−2	31	
11	Westhoek	24	9	1	14	29	48	−19	28	
12	Temse (Note: Following a merge with Lokeren a new club was created, Lokeren-Temse, to be continued to play at the fourth level (Belgian Second Amateur Division).)	24	6	6	12	22	38	−16	24	
13	Menen	24	5	5	14	28	47	−19	20	
14	Merelbeke	24	4	7	13	25	41	−16	19	
15	Sint-Niklaas (R)	24	4	4	16	22	49	−27	16	Relegation to the 2020–21 Belgian Third Amateur Division
16	Hamme (R)	24	3	6	15	34	52	−18	15	Relegation to the 2020–21 Belgian Third Amateur Division

Source: vbal4
Rules for classification: 1) Points; 2) Matches won; 3) Goal difference; 4) Goals scored; 5) Away matches won; 6) Goal difference in away matches; 7) Away goals scored.
(C) Champions; (P) Promoted; (R) Relegated

===== Division B =====
Pos	Team	Pld	W	D	L	GF	GA	GD	Pts	Qualification or relegation
1	Tienen (C, P)	23	14	2	7	40	28	+12	44	Promotion to the 2020–21 Belgian First Amateur Division
2	Bocholt	23	12	6	5	38	24	+14	42	
3	Aalst	22	12	4	6	38	23	+15	41.82 (Note: Aalst, Cappellen, Diegem, Geel, Hades, Hasselt, Hoogstraten, Spouwen-Mopertingen and Vosselaar had played one match less at the time the competition was stopped, therefore their points were scaled up by a factor 23/22.)	
4	Cappellen	22	10	5	7	34	26	+8	36.59	
5	Hades	22	9	6	7	32	29	+3	34.5	
6	Hasselt	22	8	9	5	29	30	−1	34.5	
7	Vosselaar (Note: On 18 January 2020, Vosselaar announced it would not be applying for a license to play in the national amateur leagues during the 2020–21 season due to the excessive financial costs. As a result, the team will be relegated to Belgian Provincial Leagues (but won't suffer any starting penalty as they will finish the season).) (R)	22	10	2	10	34	31	+3	33.45	Relegation to the Belgian Provincial Leagues
8	Diegem	22	9	4	9	26	26	0	32.41	
9	Berchem	23	7	7	9	31	35	−4	28	
10	Geel (Note: On 22 January 2020, due to financial difficulties, Geel announced that during the 2019–20 transfer window all players and technical staff have been released without any transfer fee, to avoid bankrupting the club. Youth players will play the remaining matches and management will devise a plan for the coming seasons. Eventually, Geel did not receive a license for both the Second and Third Amateur divisions and should normally be relegating to the Belgian Provincial Leagues as well. Geel is, however, appealing the decision to not being awarded a license. If the appeal is successful, they will remain in the Belgian Second Amateur Division.) (R)	22	7	5	10	25	30	−5	27.18	Relegation to the Belgian Provincial Leagues
11	Londerzeel	23	7	6	10	30	37	−7	27	
12	Wijgmaal	23	7	5	11	37	38	−1	26	
13	Pepingen-Halle	23	6	7	10	24	31	−7	25	
14	Hoogstraten	22	6	5	11	27	31	−4	24.05	
15	Spouwen-Mopertingen	22	6	3	13	21	47	−26	21.95	
16	Duffel (Note: On 28 January 2020, Duffel announced it would not be competing for the remainder of the season. As per the rules of the Belgian FA, all the results of Duffel were annulled and Duffel will be ranked last and penalized with a further relegation, starting the 2020–21 season at the first level of the Belgian Provincial Leagues (sixth level overall) with a nine-point penalty.) (R)	0	0	0	0	0	0	0	0	Relegation to the Belgian Provincial Leagues

Source: vbal4
Rules for classification: 1) Points; 2) Matches won; 3) Goal difference; 4) Goals scored; 5) Away matches won; 6) Goal difference in away matches; 7) Away goals scored.
(C) Champions; (P) Promoted; (R) Relegated

===== Division C =====
Pos	Team	Pld	W	D	L	GF	GA	GD	Pts	Qualification or relegation
1	Francs Borains (C, P)	24	15	7	2	50	17	+33	52	Promotion to the 2020–21 Belgian First Amateur Division
2	Meux	24	13	9	2	46	26	+20	48	
3	La Louvière	23	13	7	3	38	18	+20	48 (Note: Couvin-Mariembourg, La Louvière, Solières and Tilleur had played one match less at the time the competition was stopped, therefore their points were scaled up by a factor 24/23.)	
4	Rebecq	24	12	8	4	41	24	+17	44	
5	Hamoir	24	13	4	7	48	34	+14	43	
6	Stockay	22	10	4	8	43	37	+6	37.09 (Note: Stockay and Verlaine had played two matches less at the time the competition was stopped, therefore their points were scaled up by a factor 24/22.)	
7	Durbuy	24	8	11	5	44	39	+5	35	
8	Givry	24	10	3	11	33	38	−5	33	
9	Acren-Lessines	24	8	4	12	45	49	−4	28	
10	Tilleur (Note: Tilleur did not apply for a license and was therefore relegated to the Belgian Provincial Leagues.) (R)	23	7	5	11	28	40	−12	27.13	Relegation to the Belgian Provincial Leagues
11	Verlaine	22	7	3	12	33	47	−14	26.18	
12	Couvin-Mariembourg	23	7	4	12	35	38	−3	26.09	
13	Waremme	24	6	4	14	30	52	−22	22	
14	Solières	23	6	3	14	26	45	−19	21.91	
15	Namur FLV (R)	24	7	0	17	29	53	−24	21	Relegation to the 2020–21 Belgian Third Amateur Division
16	Onhaye (R)	24	5	6	13	27	39	−12	21	Relegation to the 2020–21 Belgian Third Amateur Division

Source: vbal4
Rules for classification: 1) Points; 2) Matches won; 3) Goal difference; 4) Goals scored; 5) Away matches won; 6) Goal difference in away matches; 7) Away goals scored.
(C) Champions; (P) Promoted; (R) Relegated

==== Belgian Third Amateur Division ====
===== Division A =====
Pos	Team	Pld	W	D	L	GF	GA	GD	Pts	Qualification or relegation
1	Zelzate (C, P)	24	18	4	2	57	21	+36	58	Promotion to the 2020–21 Belgian Second Amateur Division
2	Ninove (P)	24	14	5	5	52	20	+32	47	Promotion to the 2020–21 Belgian Second Amateur Division
3	Brakel (P)	24	14	4	6	47	22	+25	46	Promotion to the 2020–21 Belgian Second Amateur Division
4	Wetteren (P)	24	13	3	8	54	30	+24	42	Promotion to the 2020–21 Belgian Second Amateur Division
5	Lebbeke	24	12	6	6	30	20	+10	42	
6	Stekene	24	10	8	6	33	20	+13	38	
7	Lochristi	24	10	6	8	40	33	+7	36	
8	Lede	24	10	5	9	41	40	+1	35	
9	Eppegem	24	9	6	9	38	28	+10	33	
10	Wolvertem Merchtem	24	8	4	12	25	28	−3	28	
11	Wingene (Note: Wingene did not apply for a license and was therefore relegated to the Belgian Provincial Leagues.) (R)	24	8	4	12	24	32	−8	28	Relegation to the 2020–21 Belgian Provincial Leagues
12	Torhout	24	8	4	12	34	43	−9	28	
13	Overijse	24	7	5	12	32	42	−10	26	
14	Melsele	24	7	3	14	25	47	−22	24	
15	Oostnieuwkerke (R)	24	6	3	15	17	46	−29	21	Relegation to the 2020–21 Belgian Provincial Leagues
16	Bornem (R)	24	2	2	20	17	94	−77	8	Relegation to the 2020–21 Belgian Provincial Leagues

Source: https://www.vbal4.be/p010241z9.htm
(C) Champions; (P) Promoted; (R) Relegated

===== Division B =====
Pos	Team	Pld	W	D	L	GF	GA	GD	Pts	Qualification or relegation
1	Lyra-Lierse Berlaar (C, P)	24	14	7	3	46	23	+23	49	Promotion to the 2020–21 Belgian Second Amateur Division
2	City Pirates (P)	24	15	3	6	40	29	+11	48	Promotion to the 2020–21 Belgian Second Amateur Division
3	Heur-Tongeren (P)	24	14	6	4	48	26	+22	48	Promotion to the 2020–21 Belgian Second Amateur Division
4	Houtvenne (P)	24	12	9	3	47	29	+18	45	Promotion to the 2020–21 Belgian Second Amateur Division
5	Sint-Lenaarts	24	10	8	6	57	34	+23	38	
6	Betekom	24	9	10	5	43	37	+6	37	
7	Termien	24	10	5	9	41	41	0	35	
8	Wellen	24	9	6	9	36	41	−5	33	
9	Esperanza Pelt	24	10	2	12	39	42	−3	32	
10	Zwarte Leeuw	24	9	4	11	46	38	+8	31	
11	Beringen	24	8	5	11	30	38	−8	29	
12	Witgoor	24	7	7	10	31	38	−7	28	
13	Turnhout	24	5	13	6	38	40	−2	28	
14	Bilzen (R)	24	5	5	14	37	51	−14	20	Relegation to the 2020–21 Belgian Provincial Leagues
15	Helson Helchteren (R)	24	4	6	14	26	51	−25	18	Relegation to the 2020–21 Belgian Provincial Leagues
16	Linden (R)	24	3	0	21	17	64	−47	9	Relegation to the 2020–21 Belgian Provincial Leagues

Source: https://www.vbal4.be/p010242.htm
(C) Champions; (P) Promoted; (R) Relegated

===== Division C =====
Pos	Team	Pld	W	D	L	GF	GA	GD	Pts	Qualification or relegation
1	Ganshoren (C, P)	24	16	5	3	56	27	+29	53	Promotion to the 2020–21 Belgian Second Amateur Division
2	Jette (P)	24	15	3	6	45	27	+18	48	Promotion to the 2020–21 Belgian Second Amateur Division
3	Quévy-Mons	24	13	4	7	53	27	+26	43	
4	Symphorinois	24	12	4	8	35	27	+8	40	
5	Walhain (Note: After the season, Walhain was renamed to FC Golden Black and relocated to Beauvechain, but as a result had its license revoked, causing relegation to the Belgian Provincial Leagues.) (R)	24	11	7	6	42	37	+5	40	Relegation to the 2020–21 Belgian Provincial Leagues
6	CS Braine	24	11	5	8	40	38	+2	38	
7	Tournai	24	12	1	11	35	25	+10	37	
8	Saint-Ghislain	24	11	3	10	47	40	+7	36	
9	Stade Brainois	24	10	4	10	35	36	−1	34	
10	Gosselies	24	10	1	13	35	44	−9	31	
11	Manageoise	24	9	4	11	33	41	−8	31	
12	Ostiches-Ath	24	8	5	11	38	45	−7	29	
13	Pont-à-Celles-Buzet	24	8	4	12	28	42	−14	28	
14	Kosova (R)	24	6	6	12	36	55	−19	24	Relegation to the 2020–21 Belgian Provincial Leagues
15	Léopold Uccle (R)	24	4	6	14	28	44	−16	18	Relegation to the 2020–21 Belgian Provincial Leagues
16	Wavre Sports (R)	24	3	4	17	17	48	−31	13	Relegation to the 2020–21 Belgian Provincial Leagues

Source: https://www.vbal4.be/p020241.htm
(C) Champions; (P) Promoted; (R) Relegated

===== Division D =====
Pos	Team	Pld	W	D	L	GF	GA	GD	Pts	Qualification or relegation
1	Warnant (C, P)	24	16	4	4	50	27	+23	52	Promotion to the 2020–21 Belgian Second Amateur Division
2	Aische	24	14	5	5	52	23	+29	47	
3	Raeren-Eynatten	24	13	5	6	58	36	+22	44	
4	Richelle	24	13	3	8	40	23	+17	42	
5	Oppagne-Wéris	24	13	3	8	45	34	+11	42	
6	Aywaille	24	10	6	8	47	49	−2	36	
7	Rochefort	24	10	4	10	49	52	−3	34	
8	Mormont	24	9	7	8	36	40	−4	34	
9	Jodoigne	24	9	6	9	44	50	−6	33	
10	Habay	23	8	7	8	47	45	+2	32.35 (Note: Habay and Meix-devant-Virton had played one match less at the time the competition was stopped, therefore their points were scaled up by a factor 24/23.)	
11	Sprimont	24	9	5	10	37	33	+4	32	
12	Herstal	24	8	7	9	42	52	−10	31	
13	Huy	24	8	3	13	27	35	−8	27	
14	Spy (R)	24	5	6	13	41	58	−17	21	Relegation to the 2020–21 Belgian Provincial Leagues
15	Meix-devant-Virton (R)	23	4	5	14	34	55	−21	17.74	Relegation to the 2020–21 Belgian Provincial Leagues
16	Ciney (R)	24	3	2	19	25	62	−37	11	Relegation to the 2020–21 Belgian Provincial Leagues

Source: https://www.vbal4.be/p020242z9.htm
(C) Champions; (P) Promoted; (R) Relegated

=== Cup competitions ===
Competition	Winner	Score	Runner-up
2019–20 Belgian Cup	Antwerp	1–0	Club Brugge
2019 Belgian Super Cup	Genk	3–0	Mechelen

== UEFA competitions ==
Champions Genk qualified directly for the group stage of the Champions League, while runners-up Club Brugge started in the qualifying rounds. Cup winners KV Mechelen were banned from European football after being found guilty of match-fixing as part of the 2017–19 Belgian football fraud scandal, resulting in their place in the group stage of the Europa League being taken by Standard Liège for finishing third in the league. Finally Antwerp and Gent started in the UEFA Europa League qualifying rounds after respectively finishing fourth and fifth.

Date	Team	Competition	Round	Leg	Opponent	Location	Score	Belgian Team Goalscorers
25 July 2019	Gent	Europa League	Qual. Round 2	Leg 1, Home	(Romania) Viitorul Constanța	Ghelamco Arena, Ghent	6–3	Asare, Dejaegere, Kubo (2), Yaremchuk (2)
1 August 2019	Gent	Europa League	Qual. Round 2	Leg 2, Away	(Romania) Viitorul Constanța	Stadionul Viitorul, Ovidiu	2–1	Yaremchuk
6 August 2019	Club Brugge	Champions League	Qual. Round 3	Leg 1, Home	(Ukraine) Dynamo Kyiv	Jan Breydel Stadium, Bruges	1–0	Vanaken
8 August 2019	Antwerp	Europa League	Qual. Round 3	Leg 1, Home	(Czech Republic) Viktoria Plzeň	King Baudouin Stadium, Brussels	1–0	Rodrigues
8 August 2019	Gent	Europa League	Qual. Round 3	Leg 1, Away	(Cyprus) AEK Larnaca	AEK Arena – Georgios Karapatakis, Larnaca	1–1	Yaremchuk
13 August 2019	Club Brugge	Champions League	Qual. Round 3	Leg 2, Away	(Ukraine) Dynamo Kyiv	Jan Breydel Stadium, Bruges	3–3	Deli, Vormer, Openda
15 August 2019	Antwerp	Europa League	Qual. Round 3	Leg 2, Away	(Czech Republic) Viktoria Plzeň	Doosan Arena, Plzeň	2–1	Mbokani
15 August 2019	Gent	Europa League	Qual. Round 3	Leg 2, Home	(Cyprus) AEK Larnaca	Ghelamco Arena, Ghent	3–0	Depoitre, Jonathan David (2)
20 August 2019	Club Brugge	Champions League	Play-off round	Leg 1, Away	(Austria) LASK	Linzer Stadion, Linz	0–1	Vanaken
22 August 2019	Antwerp	Europa League	Play-off round	Leg 1, Away	(Netherlands) AZ	De Grolsch Veste, Enschede	1–1	Batubinsika
22 August 2019	Gent	Europa League	Play-off round	Leg 1, Home	(Croatia) Rijeka	Ghelamco Arena, Ghent	2–1	Depoitre (2)
28 August 2019	Club Brugge	Champions League	Play-off round	Leg 2, Home	(Austria) LASK	Jan Breydel Stadium, Bruges	2–1	Vanaken, Dennis
29 August 2019	Antwerp	Europa League	Play-off round	Leg 2, Home	(Netherlands) AZ	King Baudouin Stadium, Brussels	1–4 (a.e.t.)	Lamkel Zé
29 August 2019	Gent	Europa League	Play-off round	Leg 2, Away	(Croatia) Rijeka	Stadion Rujevica, Rijeka	1–1	Plastun
17 September 2019	Genk	Champions League	Group Stage	Matchday 1, Away	(Austria) Red Bull Salzburg	Stadion Wals-Siezenheim, Wals-Siezenheim	6–2	Lucumí, Samatta
18 September 2019	Club Brugge	Champions League	Group Stage	Matchday 1, Home	(Turkey) Galatasaray	Jan Breydel Stadium, Bruges	0–0	
19 September 2019	Gent	Europa League	Group Stage	Matchday 1, Home	(France) Saint-Étienne	Ghelamco Arena, Ghent	3–2	Jonathan David (2), Perrin (o.g.)
19 September 2019	Standard Liège	Europa League	Group Stage	Matchday 1, Home	(Portugal) Vitória de Guimarães	Stade Maurice Dufrasne, Liège	2–0	Hanin (o.g.), M'Poku
1 October 2019	Club Brugge	Champions League	Group Stage	Matchday 2, Away	(Spain) Real Madrid	Santiago Bernabéu Stadium, Madrid	2–2	Dennis (2)
2 October 2019	Genk	Champions League	Group Stage	Matchday 2, Home	(Italy) Napoli	Luminus Arena, Genk	0–0	
3 October 2019	Gent	Europa League	Group Stage	Matchday 2, Away	(Ukraine) Oleksandriya	Arena Lviv, Lviv	1–1	Depoitre
3 October 2019	Standard Liège	Europa League	Group Stage	Matchday 2, Away	(England) Arsenal	Emirates Stadium, London	4–0	
22 October 2019	Club Brugge	Champions League	Group Stage	Matchday 3, Home	(France) Paris Saint-Germain	Jan Breydel Stadium, Bruges	0–5	
23 October 2019	Genk	Champions League	Group Stage	Matchday 3, Home	(England) Liverpool	Luminus Arena, Genk	1–4	Odey
24 October 2019	Gent	Europa League	Group Stage	Matchday 3, Home	(Germany) Wolfsburg	Ghelamco Arena, Ghent	2–2	Yaremchuk (2)
24 October 2019	Standard Liège	Europa League	Group Stage	Matchday 3, Away	(Germany) Eintracht Frankfurt	Waldstadion, Frankfurt	2–1	Amallah
5 November 2019	Genk	Champions League	Group Stage	Matchday 4, Away	(England) Liverpool	Anfield, Liverpool	2–1	Samatta
6 November 2019	Club Brugge	Champions League	Group Stage	Matchday 4, Away	(France) Paris Saint-Germain	Parc des Princes, Paris	1–0	
7 November 2019	Gent	Europa League	Group Stage	Matchday 4, Away	(Germany) Wolfsburg	Volkswagen Arena, Wolfsburg	1–3	Yaremchuk, Depoitre, Ngadeu-Ngadjui
7 November 2019	Standard Liège	Europa League	Group Stage	Matchday 4, Home	(Germany) Eintracht Frankfurt	Stade Maurice Dufrasne, Liège	2–1	Vanheusden, Lestienne
26 November 2019	Club Brugge	Champions League	Group Stage	Matchday 5, Away	(Turkey) Galatasaray	Türk Telekom Stadium, Istanbul	1–1	Diatta
27 November 2019	Genk	Champions League	Group Stage	Matchday 5, Home	(Austria) Red Bull Salzburg	Luminus Arena, Genk	1–4	Samatta
28 November 2019	Gent	Europa League	Group Stage	Matchday 5, Away	(France) Saint-Étienne	Stade Geoffroy-Guichard, Saint-Étienne	0–0	
28 November 2019	Standard Liège	Europa League	Group Stage	Matchday 5, Away	(Portugal) Vitória de Guimarães	Estádio D. Afonso Henriques, Guimarães	1–1	Lestienne
10 December 2019	Genk	Champions League	Group Stage	Matchday 6, Away	(Italy) Napoli	Stadio San Paolo, Naples	4–0	
11 December 2019	Club Brugge	Champions League	Group Stage	Matchday 6, Home	(Spain) Real Madrid	Jan Breydel Stadium, Bruges	1–3	Vanaken
12 December 2019	Gent	Europa League	Group Stage	Matchday 6, Home	(Ukraine) Oleksandriya	Ghelamco Arena, Ghent	2–1	Depoitre (2)
12 December 2019	Standard Liège	Europa League	Group Stage	Matchday 6, Home	(England) Arsenal	Stade Maurice Dufrasne, Liège	2–2	Bastien, Amallah
20 February 2020	Club Brugge	Europa League	Round of 32	Leg 1, Home	(England) Manchester United	Jan Breydel Stadium, Bruges	1–1	Dennis
20 February 2020	Gent	Europa League	Round of 32	Leg 1, Away	(Italy) Roma	Stadio Olimpico, Rome	1–0	
27 February 2020	Club Brugge	Europa League	Round of 32	Leg 2, Away	(England) Manchester United	Old Trafford, Manchester	5–0	
27 February 2020	Gent	Europa League	Round of 32	Leg 2, Home	(Italy) Roma	Ghelamco Arena, Ghent	1–1	Jonathan David

1. Antwerp play their home matches at King Baudouin Stadium, Brussels, instead of their regular stadium Bosuilstadion, Antwerp, which does not meet UEFA requirements.
2. After a roof collapse on 10 August 2019 due to storms at their regular stadium, AFAS Stadion, Alkmaar, AZ's playoff qualifying round home match was moved to De Grolsch Veste, Enschede.
3. Oleksandriya will play their home matches at Arena Lviv, Lviv, instead of their regular home stadium CSC Nika Stadium, Oleksandriia.

=== European qualification for 2020–21 summary ===
Competition	Qualifiers	Reason for Qualification
UEFA Champions League Group Stage	Club Brugge	1st in Belgian First Division A
UEFA Champions League Third Qualifying Round for Non-Champions	Gent	2nd in Belgian First Division A
UEFA Europa League Group Stage	Antwerp	Belgian Cup Winner
UEFA Europa League Third Qualifying Round	Charleroi	3rd in Belgian First Division A
UEFA Europa League Second Qualifying Round	Standard Liège	5th in Belgian First Division A

== Managerial changes ==
This is a list of changes of managers within Belgian professional league football:

=== First Division A ===
Team	Outgoing manager	Manner of departure	Date of vacancy	Position	Replaced by	Date of appointment
Oostende	(Belgium) Franky Van der Elst (caretaker)	Replaced	End of 2018–19 season	Pre-season	(Norway) Kåre Ingebrigtsen	6 May 2019
Mouscron	(Germany) Bernd Storck	End of contract	End of 2018–19 season	Pre-season	(Germany) Bernd Hollerbach	22 May 2019
Anderlecht	(France) Karim Belhocine (caretaker)	Replaced	End of 2018–19 season	Pre-season	(Wales) Simon Davies and (Belgium) Vincent Kompany	25 May 2019 and 19 May 2019
Club Brugge	(Croatia) Ivan Leko	End of contract	End of 2018–19 season	Pre-season	(Belgium) Philippe Clement	24 May 2019
Genk	(Belgium) Philippe Clement	Moved to Club Brugge	End of 2018–19 season	Pre-season	(Belgium) Felice Mazzù	3 June 2019
Cercle Brugge	(Belgium) José Jeunechamps (caretaker)	End of caretaker spell	End of 2018–19 season	Pre-season	(France) Fabien Mercadal	19 June 2019
Charleroi	(Belgium) Felice Mazzù	Moved to Genk	End of 2018–19 season	Pre-season	(France) Karim Belhocine	21 June 2019
Eupen	(France) Claude Makélélé	Mutual consent	14 June 2019	Pre-season	(Spain) Beñat San José	24 June 2019
Waasland-Beveren	(Bosnia and Herzegovina) Adnan Čustović	Sacked	26 August 2019	16th	(Belgium) Dirk Geeraerd (caretaker)	26 August 2019
Waasland-Beveren	(Belgium) Dirk Geeraerd (caretaker)	Caretaker replaced	2 September 2019 (Note: The announcement of Mercier coming in was made on 30 August 2019, however Geeraerd remained caretaker for the match of 31 August against Charleroi and Mercier would start the job only on September 2nd.)	16th	(France) Arnauld Mercier	2 September 2019
Anderlecht	(Wales) Simon Davies	Replaced	3 October 2019 (Note: The announcement of Vercauteren coming in was made on 3 October 2019, however Jonas De Roeck was appointed caretaker manager for the match of 4 October 2019 against Charleroi and Vercauteren would start the job only on October 7th.)	13th	(Belgium) Jonas De Roeck (caretaker)	3 October 2019
Anderlecht	(Belgium) Jonas De Roeck (caretaker)	Replaced	7 October 2019	13th	(Belgium) Franky Vercauteren	7 October 2019
Cercle Brugge	(France) Fabien Mercadal	Sacked	7 October 2019	16th	(Germany) Bernd Storck	12 October 2019
Genk	(Belgium) Felice Mazzù	Sacked	12 November 2019	9th	(Germany) Hannes Wolf	18 November 2019
Sint-Truiden	(Belgium) Marc Brys	Sacked	25 November 2019	11th	(Belgium) Nicky Hayen (caretaker)	25 November 2019
Oostende	(Norway) Kåre Ingebrigtsen	Became manager at APOEL FC	28 December 2019	14th	(Netherlands) Dennis van Wijk	31 December 2019
Sint-Truiden	(Belgium) Nicky Hayen (caretaker)	Caretaker replaced	2 January 2020	11th	(Slovenia) Miloš Kostić	2 January 2020
Mouscron	(Germany) Bernd Hollerbach	Temporarily replaced due to illness	5 February 2020	11th	(Belgium) Philippe Saint-Jean (caretaker)	5 February 2020
Waasland-Beveren	(France) Arnauld Mercier	Sacked	23 February 2020	16th	(Belgium) Dirk Geeraerd (caretaker)	23 February 2020
Mouscron	(Belgium) Philippe Saint-Jean (caretaker)	Hollerbach recovered from illness	25 February 2020	10th	(Germany) Bernd Hollerbach	25 February 2020
Oostende	(Netherlands) Dennis van Wijk	Sacked	2 March 2020	15th	(Bosnia and Herzegovina) Adnan Čustović	3 March 2020

=== First Division B ===
Team	Outgoing manager	Manner of departure	Date of vacancy	Position	Replaced by	Date of appointment
Roeselare	(Spain) Juanito	Contract not prolonged	End of 2018–19 season	Pre-season	(Iceland) Arnar Grétarsson	31 July 2019
Virton	(Belgium) Samuel Petit	Caretaker Replaced	End of 2018–19 season	Pre-season	(Germany) Dino Toppmöller	31 May 2019
Lommel	(Belgium) Tom Van Imschoot	Became assistant at Genk	18 June 2019	Pre-season	(Iceland) Stefán Gíslason	27 June 2019
Union SG	(Slovenia) Luka Elsner	Became manager at Amiens	19 June 2019	Pre-season	(Spain) Thomas Christiansen	1 July 2019
Beerschot	(Belgium) Stijn Vreven	Sacked	9 October 2019	5th	(Argentina) Hernán Losada	9 October 2019
Lommel	(Iceland) Stefán Gíslason	Replaced	17 October 2019	7th	(Belgium) Peter Maes	17 October 2019
Lokeren	(Belgium) Glen De Boeck	Sacked	17 November 2019	Closing tournament: 7th Overall: 7th	(Belgium) Stijn Vreven	19 November 2019
Roeselare	(Iceland) Arnar Grétarsson	Sacked	27 November 2019	Closing tournament: 7th Overall: 8th	(France) Christophe Gamel (caretaker)	27 November 2019
Virton	(Germany) Dino Toppmöller	Resigned	2 December 2019	Closing tournament: 7th Overall: 3rd	(France) Christian Bracconi	4 December 2019
OH Leuven	(Belgium) Vincent Euvrard	Sacked	9 June 2020	Promotion play-offs, lost first leg 1-0	(Belgium) Marc Brys	16 June 2020

== See also ==
- 2019–20 Belgian First Division A
- 2019–20 Belgian First Division B
- 2019–20 Belgian First Amateur Division
- 2019–20 Belgian Second Amateur Division
- 2019–20 Belgian Third Amateur Division
- 2019–20 Belgian Cup
- 2019 Belgian Super Cup
