= 2021 UEFA European Under-21 Championship qualification Group 4 =

Football tournament qualification stage

Group 4 of the 2021 UEFA European Under-21 Championship qualifying competition consisted of six teams: Croatia, Czech Republic, Greece, Scotland, Lithuania, and San Marino. The composition of the nine groups in the qualifying group stage was decided by the draw held on 11 December 2018, 09:00 CET (UTC+1), at the UEFA headquarters in Nyon, Switzerland, with the teams seeded according to their coefficient ranking.

The group was originally scheduled to be played in home-and-away round-robin format between 5 June 2019 and 13 October 2020. Under the original format, the group winners and the best runners-up among all nine groups (not counting results against the sixth-placed team) would qualify directly for the final tournament, while the remaining eight runners-up would advance to the play-offs.

On 17 March 2020, all matches were put on hold due to the COVID-19 pandemic. On 17 June 2020, UEFA announced that the qualifying group stage would be extended and end on 17 November 2020, while the play-offs, originally scheduled to be played in November 2020, would be cancelled. Instead, the group winners and the five best runners-up among all nine groups (not counting results against the sixth-placed team) would qualify for the final tournament.

== Standings ==
Pos	Team	Pld	W	D	L	GF	GA	GD	Pts	Qualification	Czech Republic	Croatia	Scotland	Greece	Lithuania	San Marino
1	Czech Republic	10	6	3	1	20	4	+16	21	Final tournament	—	0–0	0–0	1–1	2–0	6–0
2	Croatia	10	6	2	2	37	7	+30	20	Final tournament	1–2	—	1–2	5–0	7–0	10–0
3	Scotland	10	5	3	2	16	5	+11	18		2–0	2–2	—	0–1	0–0	2–0
4	Greece	10	5	1	4	10	11	−1	16		0–2	0–1	1–0	—	1–0	5–0
5	Lithuania	10	3	1	6	9	15	−6	10		0–1	1–3	0–1	2–0	—	3–0
6	San Marino	10	0	0	10	0	50	−50	0		0–6	0–7	0–7	0–1	0–3	—

Source: UEFA
Rules for classification: Tiebreakers

== Matches ==
Times are CET/CEST, (Note: CEST (UTC+2) for dates between 31 March and 26 October 2019 and between 29 March and 24 October 2020, and CET (UTC+1) for all other dates.) as listed by UEFA (local times, if different, are in parentheses).

5 June 2019
20:30

San Marino	0–3	Lithuania
	Report	Kloniūnas 7'; Dubickas 29'; Čyžas 60'

San Marino Stadium, Serravalle
Attendance: 240
Referee: Rahim Hasanov (Azerbaijan)

10 June 2019
18:00 (19:00 EEST)

Greece	5–0	San Marino
Kampetsis 26', 68'; Pavlidis 29', 37'; Vrousai 51'	Report

Georgios Kamaras Stadium, Athens
Attendance: 258
Referee: Dumitri Muntean (Moldova)

5 September 2019
20:30 (19:30 BST)

Scotland	2–0	San Marino
Tosi 21' (o.g.); Middleton 28'	Report

St Mirren Park, Paisley
Attendance: 1,542
Referee: Vitaliy Romanov (Ukraine)
6 September 2019
18:00

Czech Republic	2–0	Lithuania
Vaníček 16'; Šašinka 68' (pen.)	Report

Stadion Střelecký ostrov, České Budějovice
Attendance: 3,823
Referee: Nicolas Laforge (Belgium)

10 September 2019
16:30 (17:30 EEST)

Greece	1–0	Lithuania
Bouzoukis 80'	Report

Grigoris Lambrakis Stadium, Kallithea
Attendance: 258
Referee: Besfort Kasumi (Kosovo)
10 September 2019
20:00

Croatia	1–2	Scotland
Kulenović 10'	Report	McLennan 81', 89'

Stadion Šubićevac, Šibenik
Attendance: 2,134
Referee: Michal Ocenáš (Slovakia)

10 October 2019
17:00

Czech Republic	1–1	Greece
Hložek 76'	Report	Bouzoukis 45+2' (pen.)

Městský stadion, Karviná
Attendance: 2,126
Referee: Jørgen Burchardt (Denmark)
10 October 2019
18:15 (17:15 BST)

Scotland	0–0	Lithuania
	Report

Tynecastle Park, Edinburgh
Attendance: 1,084
Referee: Krzysztof Jakubik (Poland)

14 October 2019
17:00

Czech Republic	0–0	Scotland
	Report

Městský fotbalový stadion Miroslava Valenty, Uherské Hradiště
Attendance: 5,187
Referee: Alain Durieux (Luxembourg)
14 October 2019
19:00

San Marino	0–7	Croatia
	Report	Kulenović 6', 24', 45+2'; Ivanušec 26', 57'; Bistrović 42'; Soldo 75'

San Marino Stadium, Serravalle
Attendance: 170
Referee: Kaarlo Oskari Hämäläinen (Finland)

14 November 2019
17:30 (18:30 EET)

Lithuania	1–3	Croatia
Antanavičius 60'	Report	Ivanušec 9'; Posavec 73'; Bistrović 89'

LFF Stadium, Vilnius
Attendance: 243
Referee: Kristoffer Hagenes (Norway)
14 November 2019
18:00

Czech Republic	6–0	San Marino
Hložek 11', 69'; Janošek 15', 82'; Krejčí 38', 67'	Report

Letní stadion, Chomutov
Attendance: 1,977
Referee: Helgi Mikael Jónasson (Iceland)
15 November 2019
20:00 (19:00 GMT)

Scotland	0–1	Greece
	Report	Nikolaou 90+1' (pen.)

Tynecastle Park, Edinburgh
Attendance: 1,284
Referee: Bojan Pandžić (Sweden)

18 November 2019
18:00

Croatia	1–2	Czech Republic
Ivanušec 30'	Report	Krejčí 39'; Bucha 72'

Stadion Radnik, Velika Gorica
Attendance: 1,636
Referee: Espen Eskås (Norway)

2 September 2020
20:30

San Marino	0–6	Czech Republic
	Report	Drchal 20', 28'; Krejčí 65', 77'; Holík 78'; Šulc 85'

San Marino Stadium, Serravalle
Attendance: 50
Referee: Amine Kourgheli (Belarus)
3 September 2020
19:00

Croatia	5–0	Greece
Moro 2'; Majer 6', 25'; Musa 15', 53'	Report

Stadion Varteks, Varaždin
Attendance: 0 (Note: Due to the COVID-19 pandemic in Europe, all matches scheduled for September 2020 were played behind closed doors.)
Referee: Marco Di Bello (Italy)

6 September 2020
20:30

San Marino	0–1	Greece
	Report	Emmanouilidis 25'

San Marino Stadium, Serravalle
Attendance: 50
Referee: Jason Lee Barcelo (Gibraltar)
7 September 2020
18:00

Czech Republic	0–0	Croatia
	Report

Stadion Střelecký ostrov, České Budějovice
Attendance: 0
Referee: Ivaylo Stoyanov (Bulgaria)
8 September 2020
17:30 (18:30 EEST)

Lithuania	0–1	Scotland
	Report	A. Campbell 82'

LFF Stadium, Vilnius
Attendance: 0
Referee: Juri Frischer (Estonia)

8 October 2020
17:30 (18:30 EEST)

Lithuania	2–0	Greece
Čyžas 17'; Mėgelaitis 66'	Report

Sūduva Stadium, Marijampolė
Attendance: 223
Referee: Kateryna Monzul (Ukraine)
8 October 2020
18:00

Croatia	10–0	San Marino
Kulenović 2'; Majer 23'; Špikić 34'; Ivanušec 40', 44', 73'; Nejašmić 52', 56'; Vizinger 78'; Gvardiol 81'	Report

Stadion Kranjčevićeva, Zagreb
Attendance: 0
Referee: Ivar Orri Kristjansson (Iceland)
9 October 2020
18:30 (17:30 BST)

Scotland	2–0	Czech Republic
Hornby 25'; McCrorie 82'	Report

Tynecastle Park, Edinburgh
Attendance: 155
Referee: Guillermo Cuadra Fernández (Spain)

13 October 2020
16:00 (17:00 EEST)

Greece	0–1	Croatia
	Report	Majer 27'

Leoforos Alexandras Stadium, Athens
Attendance: 0
Referee: José Luis Munuera Montero (Spain)
13 October 2020
17:30

San Marino	0–7	Scotland
	Report	Hornby 20' (pen.), 50', 51'; Turnbull 39'; Maguire 43'; McLennan 70'; Ashby 75'

San Marino Stadium, Serravalle
Attendance: 0
Referee: Luis Teixeira (Portugal)
13 October 2020
17:30 (18:30 EEST)

Lithuania	0–1	Czech Republic
	Report	Šašinka 22'

Sūduva Stadium, Marijampolė
Attendance: 97
Referee: Morten Krogh (Denmark)

12 November 2020 (Note: All matches originally scheduled to be played in March 2020 were postponed due to the COVID-19 pandemic in Europe. These matches were subsequently rescheduled to be played in November 2020.)
16:00 (15:00 GMT)

Scotland	2–2	Croatia
Middleton 54'; McLennan 70'	Report	Moro 20'; Bistrović 25'

Tynecastle Park, Edinburgh
Attendance: 132
Referee: Michael Fabbri (Italy)
13 November 2020
17:30 (18:30 EET)

Lithuania	3–0	San Marino
Petkevičius 31'; Banevičius 55'; Uzėla 77'	Report

LFF Stadium, Vilnius
Attendance: 0
Referee: Dzmitry Dzmitryieu (Belarus)
13 November 2020
18:00 (19:00 EET)

Greece	0–2	Czech Republic
	Report	Bucha 68' (pen.); Drchal 90+1'

Leoforos Alexandras Stadium, Athens
Attendance: 0
Referee: Adrien Jaccottet (Switzerland)

17 November 2020
17:00

Croatia	7–0	Lithuania
Špikić 13'; Musa 29', 66'; Šverko 36'; Šutalo 57'; Moro 70', 76'	Report

Stadion Aldo Drosina, Pula
Attendance: 0
Referee: Ian McNabb (Northern Ireland)
17 November 2020
17:00 (18:00 EET)

Greece	1–0	Scotland
Christopoulos 27'	Report

Leoforos Alexandras Stadium, Athens
Attendance: 0
Referee: Benoît Millot (France)

== Goalscorers ==
There were 92 goals scored in 30 matches, for an average of 3.07 goals per match.

7 goals

- (Croatia) Luka Ivanušec

5 goals

- (Croatia) Sandro Kulenović
- (Czech Republic) Ladislav Krejčí

4 goals

- (Croatia) Lovro Majer
- (Croatia) Nikola Moro
- (Croatia) Petar Musa
- (Scotland) Fraser Hornby
- (Scotland) Connor McLennan

3 goals

- (Croatia) Kristijan Bistrović
- (Czech Republic) Václav Drchal
- (Czech Republic) Adam Hložek

2 goals

- (Croatia) Darko Nejašmić
- (Croatia) Dario Špikić
- (Czech Republic) Pavel Bucha
- (Czech Republic) Dominik Janošek
- (Czech Republic) Ondřej Šašinka
- (Greece) Giannis Bouzoukis
- (Greece) Argyris Kampetsis
- (Greece) Vangelis Pavlidis
- (Lithuania) Svajūnas Čyžas
- (Scotland) Glenn Middleton

1 goal

- (Croatia) Joško Gvardiol
- (Croatia) Ivan Posavec
- (Croatia) Vinko Soldo
- (Croatia) Boško Šutalo
- (Croatia) Marin Šverko
- (Croatia) Dario Vizinger
- (Czech Republic) Libor Holík
- (Czech Republic) Pavel Šulc
- (Czech Republic) Antonín Vaníček
- (Greece) Efthymis Christopoulos
- (Greece) Dimitrios Emmanouilidis
- (Greece) Dimitris Nikolaou
- (Greece) Marios Vrousai
- (Lithuania) Domantas Antanavičius
- (Lithuania) Renatas Banevičius
- (Lithuania) Edgaras Dubickas
- (Lithuania) Edvinas Kloniūnas
- (Lithuania) Linas Mėgelaitis
- (Lithuania) Nauris Petkevičius
- (Lithuania) Karolis Uzėla
- (Scotland) Allan Campbell
- (Scotland) Harrison Ashby
- (Scotland) Barry Maguire
- (Scotland) Ross McCrorie
- (Scotland) David Turnbull

1 own goal

- (San Marino) Alessandro Tosi (against Scotland)
