= 2021 UEFA European Under-21 Championship qualification Group 8 =

Football tournament qualification stage

Group 8 of the 2021 UEFA European Under-21 Championship qualifying competition consisted of six teams: Denmark, Romania, Ukraine, Finland, Northern Ireland, and Malta. The composition of the nine groups in the qualifying group stage was decided by the draw held on 11 December 2018, 09:00 CET (UTC+1), at the UEFA headquarters in Nyon, Switzerland, with the teams seeded according to their coefficient ranking.

The group was originally scheduled to be played in home-and-away round-robin format between 6 September 2019 and 13 October 2020. Under the original format, the group winners and the best runners-up among all nine groups (not counting results against the sixth-placed team) would qualify directly for the final tournament, while the remaining eight runners-up would advance to the play-offs.

On 17 March 2020, all matches were put on hold due to the COVID-19 pandemic. On 17 June 2020, UEFA announced that the qualifying group stage would be extended and end on 17 November 2020, while the play-offs, originally scheduled to be played in November 2020, would be cancelled. Instead, the group winners and the five best runners-up among all nine groups (not counting results against the sixth-placed team) would qualify for the final tournament.

== Standings ==
Pos	Team	Pld	W	D	L	GF	GA	GD	Pts	Qualification	Denmark	Romania	Ukraine	Finland		Malta
1	Denmark	10	8	2	0	21	9	+12	26	Final tournament	—	2–1	1–1	2–1	2–1	5–1
2	Romania	10	6	2	2	22	7	+15	20	Final tournament	1–1	—	3–0	4–1	3–0	4–1
3	Ukraine	10	5	1	4	17	11	+6	16		2–3	1–0	—	0–2	3–0	4–0
4	Finland	10	4	1	5	14	15	−1	13		0–1	1–3	0–2	—	1–1	4–0
5	Northern Ireland	10	2	3	5	7	13	−6	9		0–1	0–0	1–0	2–3	—	0–0
6	Malta	10	0	1	9	4	30	−26	1		1–3	0–3	1–4	0–1	0–2	—

Source: UEFA
Rules for classification: Tiebreakers

== Matches ==
Times are CET/CEST, (Note: CEST (UTC+2) for dates between 31 March and 26 October 2019 and between 29 March and 24 October 2020, and CET (UTC+1) for all other dates.) as listed by UEFA (local times, if different, are in parentheses).

6 September 2019
17:30 (18:30 EEST)

Ukraine	0–2	Finland
	Report	Källman 18'; Valakari 81' (pen.)

Slavutych-Arena, Zaporizhia
Attendance: 3,779
Referee: Tihomir Pejin (Croatia)
6 September 2019
20:30 (19:30 BST)

Northern Ireland	0–0	Malta
	Report

Ballymena Showgrounds, Ballymena
Attendance: 723
Referee: Ferenc Karakó (Hungary)

10 September 2019
17:30 (18:30 EEST)

Ukraine	4–0	Malta
Topalov 17'; Rusyn 21'; Lyednyev 40'; Tsitaishvili 83'	Report

Slavutych-Arena, Zaporizhia
Attendance: 3,038
Referee: Juxhin Xhaja (Albania)
10 September 2019
18:00 (19:00 EEST)

Finland	1–1	Northern Ireland
Valakari 4'	Report	Thompson 35'

Raatti Stadium, Oulu
Attendance: 3,666
Referee: Julian Weinberger (Austria)
10 September 2019
18:30

Denmark	2–1	Romania
Skov Olsen 3', 55'	Report	Coman 80'

Aalborg Stadium, Aalborg
Attendance: 1,702
Referee: Erez Papir (Israel)

10 October 2019
18:00 (19:00 EEST)

Finland	4–0	Malta
Assehnoun 24'; Källman 32'; Vella 38' (o.g.); Valakari 66'	Report

Veritas Stadion, Turku
Attendance: 1,320
Referee: Robert Ian Jenkins (Wales)
10 October 2019
18:00

Denmark	2–1	Northern Ireland
Poulsen 30'; Odgaard 86'	Report	Dunwoody 57'

Aalborg Stadium, Aalborg
Attendance: 647
Referee: Donatas Rumšas (Lithuania)
10 October 2019
19:30 (20:30 EEST)

Romania	3–0	Ukraine
Moruțan 75'; Petre 80', 90+4'	Report

Ilie Oană Stadium, Ploiești
Attendance: 5,563
Referee: Bartosz Frankowski (Poland)

14 October 2019
18:00 (19:00 EEST)

Finland	0–1	Denmark
	Report	Nartey 12'

Pori Stadium, Pori
Attendance: 1,510
Referee: Peter Kralović (Slovakia)
14 October 2019
19:30 (20:30 EEST)

Romania	3–0	Northern Ireland
Băluță 48'; Mihăilă 59'; Ciobanu 67'	Report

Stadionul Anghel Iordănescu, Voluntari
Attendance: 4,067
Referee: Nejc Kajtazovic (Slovenia)

14 November 2019
19:00 (20:00 EET)

Romania	4–1	Finland
Mihăilă 8', 16', 78'; Hyvärinen 45+5' (o.g.)	Report	Kairinen 3'

Stadionul Anghel Iordănescu, Voluntari
Attendance: 2,325
Referee: Robert Hennessy (Republic of Ireland)
15 November 2019
17:30 (18:30 EET)

Ukraine	2–3	Denmark
Rusyn 63'; Tsitaishvili 73'	Report	Skov Olsen 5', 24', 59'

Arena Lviv, Lviv
Attendance: 17321
Referee: Adrien Jaccottet (Switzerland)

19 November 2019
18:00

Denmark	5–1	Malta
Larsen 1', 40' (pen.); Nelsson 4'; Odgaard 15'; Skov Olsen 67'	Report	Pulis 44'

Aalborg Stadium, Aalborg
Attendance: 1051
Referee: Luis Teixeira (Andorra)
19 November 2019
18:30 (17:30 GMT)

Northern Ireland	0–0	Romania
	Report

Ballymena Showgrounds, Ballymena
Attendance: 1641
Referee: Kai Erik Steen (Norway)

4 September 2020
18:00

Malta	0–2	Northern Ireland
	Report	Larkin 58'; Parkhouse 68'

Centenary Stadium, Ta' Qali
Attendance: 0 (Note: Due to the COVID-19 pandemic in Europe, all matches scheduled for September 2020 were played behind closed doors.)
Referee: Michal Očenáš (Slovakia)
4 September 2020
18:00

Denmark	1–1	Ukraine
Jakobsen 90+5'	Report	Sikan 74'

Aalborg Stadium, Aalborg
Attendance: 0
Referee: Jochem Kamphuis (Netherlands)
4 September 2020
18:00 (19:00 EEST)

Finland	1–3	Romania
Soisalo 25'	Report	Olaru 22'; Mihăilă 58'; Ciobanu 85'

Veritas Stadion, Turku
Attendance: 0
Referee: Anastasios Papapetrou (Greece)

8 September 2020
18:00

Malta	0–3	Romania
	Report	Man 7'; Costache 42' (pen.); Haruț 84'

Centenary Stadium, Ta' Qali
Attendance: 0
Referee: Gergő Bogár (Hungary)
8 September 2020
18:00 (17:00 BST)

Northern Ireland	0–1	Denmark
	Report	Skov Olsen 76' (pen.)

Ballymena Showgrounds, Ballymena
Attendance: 0
Referee: Igor Pajac (Croatia)
8 September 2020
18:00 (19:00 EEST)

Finland	0–2	Ukraine
	Report	Konoplya 23'; Sikan 45+3'

Helsinki Olympic Stadium, Helsinki
Attendance: 0
Referee: Thorvaldur Árnason (Iceland)

9 October 2020
17:30 (18:30 EEST)

Ukraine	1–0	Romania
Buletsa 80' (pen.)	Report

Obolon Arena, Kyiv
Attendance: 400
Referee: Furkat Atazhanov (Kazakhstan)
9 October 2020
18:00

Malta	1–3	Denmark
Attard 52'	Report	Laursen 68'; Damsgaard 84'; Lindstrøm 90+3'

Centenary Stadium, Ta' Qali
Attendance: 0
Referee: Aristotelis Diamantopoulos (Greece)
9 October 2020
19:00 (18:00 BST)

Northern Ireland	2–3	Finland
O'Neill 23', 59'	Report	Stavitski 44'; Soisalo 62'; Skyttä 68'

Ballymena Showgrounds, Ballymena
Attendance: 0
Referee: Vitor Fernandes Ferreira (Portugal)

13 October 2020
18:00

Denmark	2–1	Finland
Jensen 2', 60'	Report	Forss 51' (pen.)

Aalborg Stadium, Aalborg
Attendance: 287
Referee: Besfort Kasumi (Kosovo)
13 October 2020
19:00 (20:00 EEST)

Romania	4–1	Malta
Mățan 17'; Man 27', 40' (pen.); Ganea 36'	Report	Elouni 51'

Stadionul Marin Anastasovici, Giurgiu
Attendance: 0
Referee: Visar Kastrati (Kosovo)
13 October 2020
19:00 (18:00 BST)

Northern Ireland	1–0	Ukraine
O'Neill 61'	Report

Ballymena Showgrounds, Ballymena
Attendance: 0
Referee: Barbeno Luca (San Marino)

13 November 2020 (Note: All matches originally scheduled to be played in March 2020 were postponed due to the COVID-19 pandemic in Europe. These matches were subsequently rescheduled to be played in November 2020.)
17:00

Malta	1–4	Ukraine
Elouni 47'	Report	Kukharevych 4', 32'; Milovanov 79'; Shevtsov 90+2'

Centenary Stadium, Ta' Qali
Attendance: 0
Referee: Pavel Rejzek (Czech Republic)

17 November 2020
15:00

Malta	0–1	Finland
	Report	Källman 18'

Centenary Stadium, Ta' Qali
Attendance: 0
Referee: Nikola Popov (Bulgaria)
17 November 2020
17:30 (18:30 EET)

Ukraine	3–0	Northern Ireland
Babohlo 68'; Isayenko 70'; Kukharevych 74'	Report

Kolos Arena, Kovalivka
Attendance: 0
Referee: Rauf Jabarov (Azerbaijan)
17 November 2020
19:30 (20:30 EET)

Romania	1–1	Denmark
Costache 72'	Report	Laursen 50' (pen.)

Ilie Oană Stadium, Ploiești
Attendance: 0
Referee: Goga Kikacheishvili (Georgia)

== Goalscorers ==
There were 85 goals scored in 30 matches, for an average of 2.83 goals per match.

7 goals

- (Denmark) Andreas Skov Olsen

5 goals

- (Romania) Valentin Mihăilă

3 goals

- (Finland) Onni Valakari
- (Finland) Benjamin Källman
- (Northern Ireland) Paul O'Neill
- (Romania) Dennis Man
- (Ukraine) Mykola Kukharevych

2 goals

- (Denmark) Jacob Bruun Larsen
- (Denmark) Jens Odgaard
- (Denmark) Victor Jensen
- (Denmark) Nikolai Laursen
- (Finland) Mikael Soisalo
- (Malta) Omar Elouni
- (Romania) Andrei Ciobanu
- (Romania) Adrian Petre
- (Romania) Valentin Costache
- (Ukraine) Nazariy Rusyn
- (Ukraine) Danylo Sikan
- (Ukraine) Heorhiy Tsitaishvili

1 goal

- (Denmark) Mikkel Damsgaard
- (Denmark) Emil Riis Jakobsen
- (Denmark) Jesper Lindstrøm
- (Denmark) Nikolas Nartey
- (Denmark) Victor Nelsson
- (Denmark) Andreas Poulsen
- (Finland) Jasin-Amin Assehnoun
- (Finland) Marcus Forss
- (Finland) Kaan Kairinen
- (Finland) Timo Stavitski
- (Finland) Naatan Skyttä
- (Malta) Ayrton Attard
- (Malta) Nicholas Pulis
- (Northern Ireland) Jake Dunwoody
- (Northern Ireland) Ross Larkin
- (Northern Ireland) David Parkhouse
- (Northern Ireland) Lewis Thompson
- (Romania) Tudor Băluță
- (Romania) Florinel Coman
- (Romania) George Ganea
- (Romania) Denis Haruț
- (Romania) Olimpiu Moruțan
- (Romania) Alexandru Mățan
- (Romania) Darius Olaru
- (Ukraine) Vladyslav Babohlo
- (Ukraine) Serhiy Buletsa
- (Ukraine) Yevhen Isayenko
- (Ukraine) Yukhym Konoplya
- (Ukraine) Bohdan Lyednyev
- (Ukraine) Bogdan Milovanov
- (Ukraine) Illya Shevtsov
- (Ukraine) Dmytro Topalov

1 own goal

- (Finland) Juho Hyvärinen (against Romania)
- (Malta) Andreas Vella (against Finland)
