= 2021 UEFA European Under-21 Championship qualification Group 5 =

Football tournament qualification stage

Group 5 of the 2021 UEFA European Under-21 Championship qualifying competition consisted of six teams: Serbia, Poland, Russia, Bulgaria, Latvia, and Estonia. The composition of the nine groups in the qualifying group stage was decided by the draw held on 11 December 2018, 09:00 CET (UTC+1), at the UEFA headquarters in Nyon, Switzerland, with the teams seeded according to their coefficient ranking.

The group was originally scheduled to be played in home-and-away round-robin format between 5 September 2019 and 13 October 2020. Under the original format, the group winners and the best runners-up among all nine groups (not counting results against the sixth-placed team) would qualify directly for the final tournament, while the remaining eight runners-up would advance to the play-offs.

On 17 March 2020, all matches were put on hold due to the COVID-19 pandemic. On 17 June 2020, UEFA announced that the qualifying group stage would be extended and end on 17 November 2020, while the play-offs, originally scheduled to be played in November 2020, would be cancelled. Instead, the group winners and the five best runners-up among all nine groups (not counting results against the sixth-placed team) would qualify for the final tournament.

== Standings ==
Pos	Team	Pld	W	D	L	GF	GA	GD	Pts	Qualification	Russia	Poland	Bulgaria	Serbia	Estonia	Latvia
1	Russia	10	7	2	1	22	4	+18	23	Final tournament	—	2–2	2–0	1–0	4–0	2−0
2	Poland	10	6	2	2	19	8	+11	20		1–0	—	1–1	1–0	4–0	3–1
3	Bulgaria	10	5	3	2	14	5	+9	18		0–0	3−0	—	0–1	3–0	1–0
4	Serbia	10	3	3	4	12	9	+3	12		0–2	1–0	1–2	—	6−0	1–1
5	Estonia	10	1	2	7	3	34	−31	5		0–5	0–6	0–4	0–0	—	2–1
6	Latvia	10	0	4	6	7	17	−10	4		1–4	0–1	0–0	2–2	1–1	—

Source: UEFA
Rules for classification: Tiebreakers

== Matches ==
Times are CET/CEST, (Note: CEST (UTC+2) for dates between 31 March and 26 October 2019 and between 29 March and 24 October 2020, and CET (UTC+1) for all other dates.) as listed by UEFA (local times, if different, are in parentheses).

5 September 2019
16:30 (17:30 EEST)

Estonia	0–4	Bulgaria
	Report	Yordanov 15', 48', 65'; Ivanov 39'

Kadriorg Stadium, Tallinn
Attendance: 207
Referee: Milovan Milačić (Montenegro)
6 September 2019
16:00 (17:00 EEST)

Latvia	0–1	Poland
	Report	Klimala 27'

Zemgale Olympic Center, Jelgava
Attendance: 350
Referee: Admir Šehović (Bosnia and Herzegovina)
6 September 2019
18:00 (19:00 MSK)

Russia	1–0	Serbia
Diveyev 20'	Report

Mordovia Arena, Saransk
Attendance: 28,220
Referee: Manfredas Lukjancukas (Lithuania)

10 September 2019
18:00

Poland	4–0	Estonia
Płacheta 6'; Fila 65'; Jóźwiak 80'; Dziczek 90+4' (pen.)	Report

Białystok City Stadium, Białystok
Attendance: 6,358
Referee: Rohit Saggi (Norway)
10 September 2019
19:00

Serbia	1–1	Latvia
Adžić 57'	Report	Regža 10'

Karađorđe Stadium, Novi Sad
Attendance: 723
Referee: Keith Kennedy (Northern Ireland)
10 September 2019
19:30 (20:30 EEST)

Bulgaria	0–0	Russia
	Report

Slavia Stadium, Sofia
Attendance: 1,800
Referee: Urs Schnyder (Switzerland)

11 October 2019
16:00 (19:00 YEKT)

Russia	2–2	Poland
Utkin 25'; Suleymanov 90+1'	Report	Diveyev 10' (o.g.); Klimala 45+1'

Central Stadium, Yekaterinburg
Attendance: 16,028
Referee: Pavel Orel (Czech Republic)
11 October 2019
18:00 (19:00 EEST)

Bulgaria	0–1	Serbia
	Report	Stuparević 87'

Slavia Stadium, Sofia
Attendance: 1,020
Referee: Giorgi Kruashvili (Georgia)
11 October 2019
18:15 (19:15 EEST)

Estonia	2–1	Latvia
Soomets 11'; Valge 24'	Report	Regža 18'

Pärnu Rannastaadion, Pärnu
Attendance: 247
Referee: Rauf Jabarov (Azerbaijan)

15 October 2019
17:00 (18:00 EEST)

Latvia	0–0	Bulgaria
	Report

Skonto Stadium, Riga
Attendance: 305
Referee: Marcel Birsan (Romania)
15 October 2019
18:00

Poland	1–0	Serbia
Bogusz 79'	Report

Stadion Widzewa, Łódź
Attendance: 3,628
Referee: João Pinheiro (Portugal)
15 October 2019
18:15 (19:15 EEST)

Estonia	0–5	Russia
	Report	Chalov 26' (pen.); Glushenkov 35'; Glebov 65'; Krugovoy 69'; Kalugin 75'

Pärnu Rannastaadion, Pärnu
Attendance: 403
Referee: Nikolas Neokleous (Cyprus)

15 November 2019
16:00 (18:00 MSK)

Russia	2–0	Latvia
Diveyev 9'; Umyarov 65'	Report

Rostov Arena, Rostov-on-Don
Attendance: 11,088
Referee: Morten Krogh (Denmark)
15 November 2019
17:00 (18:00 EET)

Bulgaria	3–0	Poland
Yordanov 43'; Ivanov 51', 61'	Report

Slavia Stadium, Sofia
Attendance: 453
Referee: Yaroslav Kozyk (Ukraine)
15 November 2019
19:00

Serbia	6–0	Estonia
L. Ilić 12'; Joveljić 20', 52', 61'; I. Ilić 38'; Tedić 87'	Report

Čair Stadium, Niš
Attendance: 504
Referee: Nathan Verboomen (Belgium)

19 November 2019
19:00

Serbia	0–2	Russia
	Report	Chalov 8'; Suleymanov 44'

Čair Stadium, Niš
Attendance: 3,413
Referee: Juan Martínez Munuera (Spain)

4 September 2020
16:00 (17:00 EEST)

Latvia	2–2	Serbia
Liepa 8'; Regža 17'	Report	Mašović 51'; Adžić 67' (pen.)

Zemgale Olympic Center, Jelgava
Attendance: 0 (Note: Due to the COVID-19 pandemic in Europe, all matches scheduled for September 2020 were played behind closed doors.)
Referee: Gai Leibovitz (Israel)
4 September 2020
18:00 (19:00 EEST)

Estonia	0–6	Poland
	Report	Bogusz 5', 59'; Klimala 16'; Kamiński 35'; Gumny 48'; Tomczyk 82'

Pärnu Rannastaadion, Pärnu
Attendance: 0
Referee: Petri Viljanen (Finland)
4 September 2020
18:00 (19:00 MSK)

Russia	2–0	Bulgaria
Glushenkov 2'; Diveyev 66'	Report

Arena Khimki, Khimki
Attendance: 0
Referee: Arda Kardeşler (Turkey)

8 September 2020
16:00 (17:00 EEST)

Latvia	1–1	Estonia
Regža 62'	Report	Reinkort 54'

Zemgale Olympic Center, Jelgava
Attendance: 0
Referee: Goga Kikacheishvili (Georgia)
8 September 2020
18:00

Poland	1–0	Russia
Dziczek 62'	Report

Stadion Widzewa, Łódź
Attendance: 0
Referee: Kevin Clancy (Scotland)
8 September 2020
20:00

Serbia	1–2	Bulgaria
L. Ilić 87' (pen.)	Report	Iliev 45+1'; Krastev 65'

Stadion Metalac, Gornji Milanovac
Attendance: 0
Referee: Espen Eskås (Norway)

9 October 2020
17:00 (18:00 MSK)

Russia	4–0	Estonia
Villota 8' (o.g.); Kuchayev 13'; Chalov 21' (pen.), 40'	Report

Arena Khimki, Khimki
Attendance: 650
Referee: Antonio Nobre (Portugal)
9 October 2020
17:45 (18:45 EEST)

Bulgaria	1–0	Latvia
Ivanov 67'	Report

Stadion Slavia, Sofia
Attendance: 0
Referee: Viktor Shimusik (Belarus)
9 October 2020
18:00

Serbia	1–0	Poland
Nikolić 11'	Report

Stadion Metalac, Gornji Milanovac
Attendance: 0
Referee: Bram Van Driessche (Belgium)

13 October 2020
15:00 (16:00 EEST)

Estonia	0–0	Serbia
	Report

Slokas Stadium, Jūrmala (Latvia) (Note: The match between Estonia and Serbia was played in Latvia due to travel restrictions related to the COVID-19 pandemic between Estonia and Serbia.)
Attendance: 0
Referee: Paul McLaughlin (Ireland)
13 October 2020
16:00 (17:00 EEST)

Latvia	1–4	Russia
Lūsiņš 90+3'	Report	Kuchayev 28'; Yevgenyev 51'; Lesovoy 55'; Lomovitsky 85'

Skonto Stadium, Riga
Attendance: 653
Referee: Roomer Tarajev (Estonia)
13 October 2020
18:00

Poland	1–1	Bulgaria
Bida 66'	Report	Dimitrov 41'

Stadion Miejski, Gdynia
Attendance: 1,894
Referee: Allard Lindhout (Netherlands)

17 November 2020 (Note: All matches originally scheduled to be played in March 2020 were postponed due to the COVID-19 pandemic in Europe. These matches were subsequently rescheduled to be played in November 2020.)
17:30 (18:30 EET)

Bulgaria	3–0	Estonia
Kotev 28'; Tombak 30'; Krastev 88'	Report

Stadion Slavia, Sofia
Attendance: 0
Referee: Walter Altmann (Austria)
17 November 2020
17:30

Poland	3–1	Latvia
Białek 48'; Kiwior 61'; Klimala 71'	Report	Regža 89'

Stadion Widzewa, Łódź
Attendance: 0
Referee: Dragan Petrovic (Bosnia and Herzegovina)

== Goalscorers ==
There were 77 goals scored in 30 matches, for an average of 2.57 goals per match.

5 goals

- (Latvia) Marko Regža

4 goals

- (Bulgaria) Stanislav Ivanov
- (Bulgaria) Tonislav Yordanov
- (Poland) Patryk Klimala
- (Russia) Fyodor Chalov

3 goals

- (Poland) Mateusz Bogusz
- (Russia) Igor Diveyev
- (Serbia) Dejan Joveljić

2 goals

- (Bulgaria) Kaloyan Krastev
- (Poland) Patryk Dziczek
- (Russia) Maksim Glushenkov
- (Russia) Konstantin Kuchayev
- (Russia) Magomed-Shapi Suleymanov
- (Serbia) Luka Adžić
- (Serbia) Luka Ilić

1 goal

- (Bulgaria) Zdravko Dimitrov
- (Bulgaria) Ilian Iliev
- (Bulgaria) Lachezar Kotev
- (Bulgaria) Ertan Tombak
- (Estonia) Sten Reinkort
- (Estonia) Markus Soomets
- (Estonia) Ander Ott Valge
- (Latvia) Kristaps Liepa
- (Latvia) Kristers Lūsiņš
- (Poland) Bartosz Białek
- (Poland) Bartosz Bida
- (Poland) Karol Fila
- (Poland) Robert Gumny
- (Poland) Kamil Jóźwiak
- (Poland) Jakub Kamiński
- (Poland) Jakub Piotr Kiwior
- (Poland) Przemysław Płacheta
- (Poland) Paweł Tomczyk
- (Russia) Danil Glebov
- (Russia) Nikita Kalugin
- (Russia) Danil Krugovoy
- (Russia) Daniil Lesovoy
- (Russia) Aleksandr Lomovitskiy
- (Russia) Nail Umyarov
- (Russia) Daniil Utkin
- (Russia) Roman Yevgenyev
- (Serbia) Ivan Ilić
- (Serbia) Erhan Mašović
- (Serbia) Veljko Nikolić
- (Serbia) Filip Stuparević
- (Serbia) Slobodan Tedić

1 own goal

- (Russia) Igor Diveyev (against Poland)
- (Estonia) Magnus Villota (against Russia)
