= 2021 UEFA European Under-21 Championship =

23rd edition of the UEFA European Under-21 Championship

2021-es U21-es labdarúgó-Európa-bajnokság (in Hungarian) Evropsko prvenstvo v nogometu do 21 let 2021 (in Slovene)

Tournament details
- Host countries: Hungary; Slovenia
- Dates: 24–31 March 2021 (group stage); 31 May – 6 June 2021 (knockout stage)
- Teams: 16 (from 1 confederation)
- Venue: 8 (in 8 host cities)

Final positions
- Champions: Germany (3rd title)
- Runners-up: Portugal

Tournament statistics
- Matches played: 31
- Goals scored: 83 (2.68 per match)
- Attendance: 13,413 (433 per match)
- Top scorer(s): (Germany) Lukas Nmecha (4 goals)
- Best player: (Portugal) Fábio Vieira

The 2021 UEFA European Under-21 Championship (also known as UEFA Under-21 Euro 2021) was the 23rd edition of the UEFA European Under-21 Championship (26th edition if the Under-23 era is also included), the biennial international youth football championship organised by UEFA for the men's under-21 national teams of Europe. Initially, 12 teams were to play in the tournament, however on 6 February 2019, UEFA's executive committee increased this number to 16. Only players born on or after 1 January 1998 were eligible to participate.

The tournament was co-hosted by Hungary and Slovenia. It was originally scheduled to take place from 9 to 26 June 2021. However, the tournament was rescheduled following the postponement of UEFA Euro 2020 to June/July 2021 due to the COVID-19 pandemic. The new dates were to be decided initially on 27 May 2020, but then postponed to 17 June 2020, where the UEFA Executive Committee meeting discussed the calendar and format of the tournament. On 17 June 2020, UEFA announced the tournament would be played in two stages; the group stage, which took place from 24 to 31 March 2021, and the knockout stage, which took place from 31 May to 6 June 2021. Due to COVID-19 pandemic the VAR system wasn't used.

Spain were the defending champions, but were eliminated in the knockout phase by Portugal.

== Host selection ==
The following associations indicated their interests to bid for the tournament:

- Hungary / Slovenia (joint bid)

Hungary and Slovenia were appointed as co-hosts at the UEFA Executive Committee meeting in Dublin, Republic of Ireland on 3 December 2018.

== Qualification ==
All 55 UEFA nations entered the competition, and, unlike the last competition, co-hosts Hungary and Slovenia qualified automatically, and the other 53 teams competed in the qualifying competition to determine the remaining 14 spots in the final tournament. The draw for the qualifying group stage was held on 11 December 2018. The qualifying group stage took place from March 2019 to October 2020, while the play-offs were set to take place in November 2020. The qualifying competition would originally consist of two rounds:

- Qualifying group stage: The 53 teams were drawn into nine groups: eight groups of six teams and one group of five teams. Each group was played in home-and-away round-robin format. The nine group winners and the best runner-up (not counting results against the sixth-placed team) qualified directly for the final tournament, while the remaining eight runners-up advance to the play-offs.
- Play-offs: The eight teams were drawn into four ties to play home-and-away two-legged matches to determine the last four qualified teams.

However, due to the COVID-19 pandemic in Europe which caused the postponement of matches in the qualifying group stage, UEFA announced on 17 June 2020 that the play-offs would be cancelled. Instead, the nine group winners and the five best runners-up (not counting results against the sixth-placed team) qualified for the final tournament.

=== Qualified teams ===
The following teams qualified for the final tournament.

Note: All appearance statistics include only U-21 era (since 1978).

Team	Method of qualification	Date of qualification	Appearance	Last appearance	Previous best performance
Hungary	Co-hosts	3 December 2018	5th	1996 (quarter-finals)	Semi-finals (1986)
Slovenia	Co-hosts	3 December 2018	1st	—	Debut
Russia	Group 5 winners	13 October 2020	4th (7th incl. Soviet Union)	2013 (group stage)	Champions (1980, 1990)
Switzerland	Group 2 runners-up	13 October 2020	4th	2011 (runners-up)	Runners-up (2011)
Netherlands	Group 7 winners	13 October 2020	8th	2013 (semi-finals)	Champions (2006, 2007)
Denmark	Group 8 winners	13 October 2020	9th	2019 (group stage)	Semi-finals (1992, 2015)
Spain	Group 6 winners	13 October 2020	15th	2019 (champions)	Champions (1986, 1998, 2011, 2013, 2019)
England	Group 3 winners	13 October 2020	16th	2019 (group stage)	Champions (1982, 1984)
France	Group 2 winners	12 November 2020	10th	2019 (semi-finals)	Champions (1988)
Italy	Group 1 winners	15 November 2020	21st	2019 (group stage)	Champions (1992, 1994, 1996, 2000, 2004)
Portugal	Group 7 runners-up	15 November 2020	9th	2017 (group stage)	Runners-up (1994, 2015)
Czech Republic	Group 4 winners	17 November 2020	8th (14th incl. Czechoslovakia)	2017 (group stage)	Champions (2002)
Germany	Group 9 winners	17 November 2020	13th	2019 (runners-up)	Champions (2009, 2017)
Croatia	Group 4 runners-up	17 November 2020	4th	2019 (group stage)	Group stage (2000, 2004, 2019)
Romania	Group 8 runners-up	17 November 2020	3rd	2019 (semi-finals)	Semi-finals (2019)
Iceland	Group 1 runners-up	24 November 2020	2nd	2011 (group stage)	Group stage (2011)

Notes

1. The best five runners-up among all nine groups qualified for the final tournament.

=== Final draw ===
The final draw was held on 10 December 2020, 15:00 CET, at the UEFA headquarters in Nyon, Switzerland. The sixteen teams were drawn into four groups of four teams. The teams were seeded according to their coefficient ranking following the end of the qualifying stage, calculated based on the following:

- 2017 UEFA European Under-21 Championship final tournament and qualifying competition (20%)
- 2019 UEFA European Under-21 Championship final tournament and qualifying competition (40%)
- 2021 UEFA European Under-21 Championship qualifying competition (group stage only) (40%)

The hosts Hungary and Slovenia were assigned to position A1 and B1 respectively in the draw, while the other fourteen teams were drawn to the other available positions in their group.

Pot 1
Team	Coeff
Spain	40,620
Germany	38,490
France	37,147
England	36,846

Pot 2
Team	Coeff
Italy	36,361
Denmark	36,088
Portugal	35,863
Netherlands	32,686

Pot 3
Team	Coeff
Romania	32,198
Croatia	31,902
Czech Republic	29,648
Russia	29,162

Pot 4
Team	Coeff
Switzerland	28,059
Iceland	26,071
Slovenia (position B1)	25,851
Hungary (position A1)	21,318

== Venues ==
The following were the venues where the competition was played:

Hungary
Székesfehérvár	Szombathely	Budapest	Győr
MOL Aréna Sóstó (Aréna Sóstó)	Haladás Sportkomplexum (Haladás Stadion)	Bozsik Aréna	Ménfői úti Stadion (Gyirmóti Stadion)
Capacity: 14,000	Capacity: 8,900	Capacity: 8,468	Capacity: 4,335
Locations of stadiums in Hungary		Locations of stadiums in Slovenia	
Slovenia
Ljubljana	Celje	Maribor	Koper
Stožice Stadium	Stadion Z'dežele (Stadion Celje)	Ljudski vrt	Bonifika Stadium
Capacity: 16,100	Capacity: 13,600	Capacity: 12,702	Capacity: 4,010

The provisional schedule was announced in November 2019, with the above eight venues hosting matches. Hungary (Groups A and C) and Slovenia (Groups B and D) would both host two groups, two quarter-finals and one semi-final each, while the final would be played in Slovenia at the Stožice Stadium, Ljubljana.

== Match officials ==
Country	Referee	1st assistant referee	2nd assistant referee
Belgium	Lawrence Visser	Thibaud Nijssen	Ruben Wyns
Bosnia and Herzegovina	Irfan Peljto	Davor Beljo	Senad Ibrišimbegović
Spain	Guillermo Cuadra Fernández	Íñigo Prieto López de Cerain	José Enrique Naranjo Pérez
Italy	Maurizio Mariani	Alberto Tegoni	Daniele Bindoni
Switzerland	Sandro Schärer	Stéphane De Almeida	Bekim Zogaj
Turkey	Halil Umut Meler	Mustafa Emre Eyisoy	Abdullah Bora Özkara
France	François Letexier	Cyril Mugnier	Mehdi Rahmouni
Georgia	Giorgi Kruashvili	Levan Varamishvili	Zaza Pipia
Germany	Harm Osmers	Eduard Beitinger	Dominik Schaal
Netherlands	Dennis Higler	Joost van Zuilen	Johan Balder
Poland	Bartosz Frankowski	Jakub Winkler	Dawid Golis
Sweden	Glenn Nyberg	Mahbod Beigi	Andreas Söderkvist

Fourth officials

- (France) Jérôme Brisard
- (Georgia (country)) Irakli Kvirikashvili
- (Hungary) Ádám Farkas
- (Italy) Daniele Doveri
- (Norway) Espen Eskås
- (Romania) Horațiu Feșnic
- (Slovenia) Rade Obrenović
- (Spain) Juan Martínez Munuera

== Squads ==
Each national team had to submit a squad of 23 players, three of whom had to be goalkeepers. If a player was injured or ill severely enough to prevent his participation in the tournament before his team's first match, he could be replaced by another player.

== Group stage ==
The group winners and runners-up advanced to the quarter-finals.

Tiebreakers

In the group stage, teams were ranked according to points (3 points for a win, 1 point for a draw, 0 points for a loss), and if tied on points, the following tiebreaking criteria were applied, in the order given, to determine the rankings (Regulations Articles 18.01 and 18.02):

1. Points in head-to-head matches among tied teams;
2. Goal difference in head-to-head matches among tied teams;
3. Goals scored in head-to-head matches among tied teams;
4. If more than two teams were tied, and after applying all head-to-head criteria above, a subset of teams were still tied, all head-to-head criteria above were reapplied exclusively to this subset of teams;
5. Goal difference in all group matches;
6. Goals scored in all group matches;
7. Penalty shoot-out if only two teams had the same number of points, and they met in the last round of the group and were tied after applying all criteria above (not used if more than two teams had the same number of points, or if their rankings were not relevant for qualification for the next stage);
8. Disciplinary points (red card = 3 points, yellow card = 1 point, expulsion for two yellow cards in one match = 3 points);
9. UEFA coefficient ranking for the final draw.

All times are local, CET (UTC+1) for matches between 24 and 27 March 2021, CEST (UTC+2) for matches between 28 and 31 March 2021.

=== Group A ===
Pos	Team	Pld	W	D	L	GF	GA	GD	Pts	Qualification
1	Netherlands	3	1	2	0	8	3	+5	5 (Note: Tied on head-to-head points (2) and head-to-head goal difference (0). Head-to-head goals scored: Netherlands 2, Germany 1, Romania 1. Germany and Romania were ranked on overall goal difference.)	Advance to knockout stage
2	Germany	3	1	2	0	4	1	+3	5	Advance to knockout stage
3	Romania	3	1	2	0	3	2	+1	5	
4	Hungary (H)	3	0	0	3	2	11	−9	0	

Source: UEFA
Rules for classification: Tiebreakers
(H) Hosts
Notes:
24 March 2021
21:00

Hungary	0–3	Germany
	Report	Nmecha 61'; Baku 66', 73'

MOL Aréna Sóstó, Székesfehérvár
Attendance: 0 (Note: Due to the COVID-19 pandemic in Europe, the match was played behind closed doors.)
Referee: Guillermo Cuadra Fernández (Spain)
24 March 2021
21:00

Romania	1–1	Netherlands
Ciobanu 20'	Report	Schuurs 16'

Bozsik Aréna, Budapest
Attendance: 0
Referee: Sandro Schärer (Switzerland)

27 March 2021
18:00

Hungary	1–2	Romania
Csonka 56'	Report	Mățan 70'; Pașcanu 87'

Bozsik Aréna, Budapest
Attendance: 0
Referee: Lawrence Visser (Belgium)
27 March 2021
21:00

Germany	1–1	Netherlands
Nmecha 84'	Report	Kluivert 48'

MOL Aréna Sóstó, Székesfehérvár
Attendance: 0
Referee: Maurizio Mariani (Italy)

30 March 2021
18:00

Netherlands	6–1	Hungary
De Wit 42'; Boadu 47' (pen.); Gakpo 58', 70'; Botman 87'; Brobbey 89'	Report	Bolla 65' (pen.)

MOL Aréna Sóstó, Székesfehérvár
Attendance: 0
Referee: Sandro Schärer (Switzerland)
30 March 2021
18:00

Germany	0–0	Romania
	Report

Bozsik Aréna, Budapest
Attendance: 0
Referee: Guillermo Cuadra Fernández (Spain)

=== Group B ===
Pos	Team	Pld	W	D	L	GF	GA	GD	Pts	Qualification
1	Spain	3	2	1	0	5	0	+5	7	Advance to knockout stage
2	Italy	3	1	2	0	5	1	+4	5	Advance to knockout stage
3	Czech Republic	3	0	2	1	2	4	−2	2	
4	Slovenia (H)	3	0	1	2	1	8	−7	1	

Source: UEFA
Rules for classification: Tiebreakers
(H) Hosts
24 March 2021
18:00

Slovenia	0–3	Spain
	Report	Puado 53'; Villar 54'; Miranda 89'

Ljudski vrt, Maribor
Attendance: 0
Referee: François Letexier (France)
24 March 2021
18:00

Czech Republic	1–1	Italy
Maggiore 75' (o.g.)	Report	Scamacca 31'

Stadion Z'dežele, Celje
Attendance: 0
Referee: Dennis Higler (Netherlands)

27 March 2021
18:00

Slovenia	1–1	Czech Republic
Matko 32'	Report	Prelec 86' (o.g.)

Stadion Z'dežele, Celje
Attendance: 0
Referee: Glenn Nyberg (Sweden)
27 March 2021
21:00

Spain	0–0	Italy
	Report

Ljudski vrt, Maribor
Attendance: 0
Referee: Harm Osmers (Germany)

30 March 2021
21:00

Italy	4–0	Slovenia
Maggiore 10'; Raspadori 19'; Cutrone 25' (pen.), 50'	Report

Ljudski vrt, Maribor
Attendance: 0
Referee: Bartosz Frankowski (Poland)
30 March 2021
21:00

Spain	2–0	Czech Republic
Gómez 69', 78'	Report

Stadion Z'dežele, Celje
Attendance: 0
Referee: Giorgi Kruashvili (Georgia)

=== Group C ===
Pos	Team	Pld	W	D	L	GF	GA	GD	Pts	Qualification
1	Denmark	3	3	0	0	6	0	+6	9	Advance to knockout stage
2	France	3	2	0	1	4	1	+3	6	Advance to knockout stage
3	Russia	3	1	0	2	4	6	−2	3	
4	Iceland	3	0	0	3	1	8	−7	0	

Source: UEFA
Rules for classification: Tiebreakers
25 March 2021
18:00

Russia	4–1	Iceland
Chalov 31' (pen.); Tiknizyan 42'; Zakharyan 45+2'; Makarov 53'	Report	Guðjohnsen 59'

Ménfői úti Stadion, Győr
Attendance: 0
Referee: Halil Umut Meler (Turkey)
25 March 2021
21:00

France	0–1	Denmark
	Report	Dreyer 75'

Haladás Sportkomplexum, Szombathely
Attendance: 0
Referee: Irfan Peljto (Bosnia and Herzegovina)

28 March 2021
21:00

Russia	0–2	France
	Report	Édouard 15' (pen.); Ikoné 24' (pen.)

Haladás Sportkomplexum, Szombathely
Attendance: 0
Referee: Guillermo Cuadra Fernández (Spain)
28 March 2021
15:00

Iceland	0–2	Denmark
	Report	Isaksen 5'; Bech 18'

Ménfői úti Stadion, Győr
Attendance: 0
Referee: Halil Umut Meler (Turkey)

31 March 2021
18:00

Denmark	3–0	Russia
Bruun Larsen 10'; Dreyer 11'; Holse 90'	Report

Haladás Sportkomplexum, Szombathely
Attendance: 0
Referee: Maurizio Mariani (Italy)
31 March 2021
18:00

Iceland	0–2	France
	Report	Guendouzi 17'; Édouard 38'

Ménfői úti Stadion, Győr
Attendance: 0
Referee: Lawrence Visser (Belgium)

=== Group D ===
Pos	Team	Pld	W	D	L	GF	GA	GD	Pts	Qualification
1	Portugal	3	3	0	0	6	0	+6	9	Advance to knockout stage
2	Croatia	3	1	0	2	4	5	−1	3 (Note: Tied on head-to-head points (3) and head-to-head goal difference (0). Head-to-head goals scored: Croatia 4, Switzerland 3, England 2.)	Advance to knockout stage
3	Switzerland	3	1	0	2	3	6	−3	3	
4	England	3	1	0	2	2	4	−2	3	

Source: UEFA
Rules for classification: Tiebreakers
Notes:
25 March 2021
21:00

Portugal	1–0	Croatia
Vieira 68'	Report

Bonifika Stadium, Koper
Attendance: 0
Referee: Bartosz Frankowski (Poland)
25 March 2021
15:00

England	0–1	Switzerland
	Report	Ndoye 78'

Bonifika Stadium, Koper
Attendance: 0
Referee: Giorgi Kruashvili (Georgia)

28 March 2021
18:00

Croatia	3–2	Switzerland
Ivanušec 8'; Moro 61' (pen.); Vizinger 64'	Report	Imeri 79' (pen.); Kulenović 89' (o.g.)

Bonifika Stadium, Koper
Attendance: 0
Referee: Dennis Higler (Netherlands)
28 March 2021
21:00

Portugal	2–0	England
Mota 64'; Trincão 74' (pen.)	Report

Stadion Stožice, Ljubljana
Attendance: 0
Referee: François Letexier (France)

31 March 2021
18:00

Switzerland	0–3	Portugal
	Report	Queirós 3'; Trincão 60'; Conceição 65'

Stadion Stožice, Ljubljana
Attendance: 0
Referee: Glenn Nyberg (Sweden)
31 March 2021
18:00

Croatia	1–2	England
Bradarić 90+1'	Report	Eze 12' (pen.); Jones 74'

Bonifika Stadium, Koper
Attendance: 0
Referee: Harm Osmers (Germany)

== Knockout stage ==
In the knockout stage, extra time and a penalty shoot-out were used to decide the winners if necessary.

=== Bracket ===
Quarter-finals
31 May – Budapest
Netherlands	2
France	1
31 May – Székesfehérvár
Denmark	2 (5)
Germany (p)	2 (6)
31 May – Maribor
Spain (a.e.t.)	2
Croatia	1
31 May – Ljubljana
Portugal (a.e.t.)	5
Italy	3

Semi-finals
3 June – Székesfehérvár
Netherlands	1
Germany	2
3 June – Maribor
Spain	0
Portugal	1

Final
6 June – Ljubljana
Germany	1
Portugal	0

=== Quarter-finals ===
31 May 2021
18:00

Netherlands	2–1	France
Boadu 51', 90+3'	Report	Upamecano 23'

Bozsik Aréna, Budapest
Attendance: 1,672
Referee: Maurizio Mariani (Italy)

31 May 2021
21:00

Denmark	2–2 (a.e.t.)	Germany
Faghir 69'; Nelsson 108' (pen.)	Report	Nmecha 88'; Burkardt 100'
Penalties
Isaksen (penalty scored); Holse (penalty scored); Faghir (penalty missed); Hjulmand (penalty scored); Nelsson (penalty scored); Nartey (penalty scored); Kristiansen (penalty missed)	5–6	(penalty missed) Burkardt; (penalty scored) Maier; (penalty scored) Mai; (penalty scored) Schlotterbeck; (penalty scored) Nmecha; (penalty scored) Pieper; (penalty scored) Jaeckel

MOL Aréna Sóstó, Székesfehérvár
Attendance: 457
Referee: Guillermo Cuadra Fernández (Spain)

31 May 2021
18:00

Spain	2–1 (a.e.t.)	Croatia
Puado 66', 110'	Report	Ivanušec 90+4' (pen.)

Ljudski vrt, Maribor
Attendance: 1,886
Referee: Giorgi Kruashvili (Georgia)

31 May 2021
21:00

Portugal	5–3 (a.e.t.)	Italy
Mota 6', 31'; Ramos 58'; Jota 109'; Conceição 119'	Report	Pobega 45'; Scamacca 60'; Cutrone 89'

Stadion Stožice, Ljubljana
Attendance: 1,032
Referee: François Letexier (France)

=== Semi-finals ===
3 June 2021
21:00

Netherlands	1–2	Germany
Schuurs 67'	Report	Wirtz 1', 8'

MOL Aréna Sóstó, Székesfehérvár
Attendance: 1,573
Referee: Sandro Schärer (Switzerland)

3 June 2021
18:00

Spain	0–1	Portugal
	Report	Cuenca 80' (o.g.)

Ljudski vrt, Maribor
Attendance: 1,910
Referee: Glenn Nyberg (Sweden)

=== Final ===
6 June 2021
21:00

Germany	1–0	Portugal
Nmecha 49'	Report

Stožice Stadium, Ljubljana
Attendance: 4,883
Referee: Giorgi Kruashvili (Georgia)

== Goalscorers ==
There were 83 goals scored in 31 matches, for an average of 2.68 goals per match.

4 goals

- (Germany) Lukas Nmecha

3 goals

- (Italy) Patrick Cutrone
- (Netherlands) Myron Boadu
- (Portugal) Dany Mota
- (Spain) Javi Puado

2 goals

- (Croatia) Luka Ivanušec
- (Denmark) Anders Dreyer
- (France) Odsonne Édouard
- (Germany) Ridle Baku
- (Germany) Florian Wirtz
- (Italy) Gianluca Scamacca
- (Netherlands) Cody Gakpo
- (Netherlands) Perr Schuurs
- (Portugal) Francisco Conceição
- (Portugal) Francisco Trincão
- (Spain) Daniel Gómez Alcón

1 goal

- (Croatia) Domagoj Bradarić
- (Croatia) Nikola Moro
- (Croatia) Dario Vizinger
- (Denmark) Mads Bech Sørensen
- (Denmark) Jacob Bruun Larsen
- (Denmark) Wahid Faghir
- (Denmark) Carlo Holse
- (Denmark) Gustav Isaksen
- (Denmark) Victor Nelsson
- (England) Eberechi Eze
- (England) Curtis Jones
- (France) Matteo Guendouzi
- (France) Jonathan Ikoné
- (France) Dayot Upamecano
- (Germany) Jonathan Burkardt
- (Hungary) Bendegúz Bolla
- (Hungary) András Csonka
- (Iceland) Sveinn Aron Guðjohnsen
- (Italy) Giulio Maggiore
- (Italy) Tommaso Pobega
- (Italy) Giacomo Raspadori
- (Netherlands) Sven Botman
- (Netherlands) Brian Brobbey
- (Netherlands) Dani de Wit
- (Netherlands) Justin Kluivert
- (Portugal) Jota
- (Portugal) Diogo Queirós
- (Portugal) Gonçalo Ramos
- (Portugal) Fábio Vieira
- (Romania) Andrei Ciobanu
- (Romania) Alexandru Mățan
- (Romania) Alex Pașcanu
- (Russia) Fyodor Chalov
- (Russia) Denis Makarov
- (Russia) Nair Tiknizyan
- (Russia) Arsen Zakharyan
- (Slovenia) Aljoša Matko
- (Spain) Juan Miranda
- (Spain) Gonzalo Villar
- (Switzerland) Kastriot Imeri
- (Switzerland) Dan Ndoye

1 own goal

- (Croatia) Sandro Kulenović (against Switzerland)
- (Italy) Giulio Maggiore (against Czech Republic)
- (Slovenia) Nik Prelec (against Czech Republic)
- (Spain) Jorge Cuenca (against Portugal)

== Awards ==
The following awards were given at the conclusion of the tournament:

- Player of the Tournament: (Portugal) Fábio Vieira
- Golden Boot: (Germany) Lukas Nmecha

=== Team of the tournament ===
After the tournament the Under-21 Team of the Tournament was selected by the UEFA Technical Observers.

Position	Player
Goalkeepers	(Romania) Andrei Vlad
Goalkeepers	(Italy) Marco Carnesecchi
Goalkeepers	(Portugal) Diogo Costa
Defenders	(Germany) David Raum
Defenders	(Portugal) Diogo Queirós
Defenders	(Germany) Nico Schlotterbeck
Defenders	(Denmark) Mads Bech Sørensen
Defenders	(Netherlands) Perr Schuurs
Defenders	(Denmark) Victor Nelsson
Defenders	(Germany) Ridle Baku
Defenders	(Spain) Jorge Cuenca
Midfielders	(Portugal) Fábio Vieira
Midfielders	(Netherlands) Dani de Wit
Midfielders	(Spain) Gonzalo Villar
Midfielders	(Portugal) Vitinha
Midfielders	(Germany) Niklas Dorsch
Midfielders	(Russia) Denis Makarov
Midfielders	(Germany) Arne Maier
Forwards	(Croatia) Luka Ivanušec
Forwards	(Germany) Lukas Nmecha
Forwards	(Denmark) Jacob Bruun Larsen
Forwards	(Portugal) Dany Mota
Forwards	(Spain) Javi Puado

== Broadcasting ==
=== Europe ===
Country/region	Broadcaster	
Country/region	Free	Pay
Austria	ORF	
Belgium	RTBF	
Bulgaria	BNT	
Croatia	HRT	
Czech Republic	ČT	
Denmark	DR	
France	France Télévisions	
Hungary	MTV	
Ireland	Sky Sports (YouTube, non-England games only)	Sky Sports (England games only)
United Kingdom	Sky Sports (YouTube, non-England games only)	Sky Sports (England games only)
Italy	RAI	
Germany	ProSiebenSat.1	
Netherlands	NOS (Netherlands games only and Final)	
Russia	Match TV	
Portugal	RTP	
Romania	TVR	
Slovenia	RTV Slovenia	
Spain	Mediaset España	
Sweden	SVT	
Switzerland	SRG SSR	
Turkey	TRT	
Ukraine	UA:First	

=== Outside Europe ===
Country/Region	Broadcaster
China	Super Sports
India	Sony Six
Japan	Wowow
Latin America	ESPN
Middle East	beIN Sports
North Africa	beIN Sports
United States	ESPN, TUDN
