= Alessandro Tosi =

Sammarinese footballer

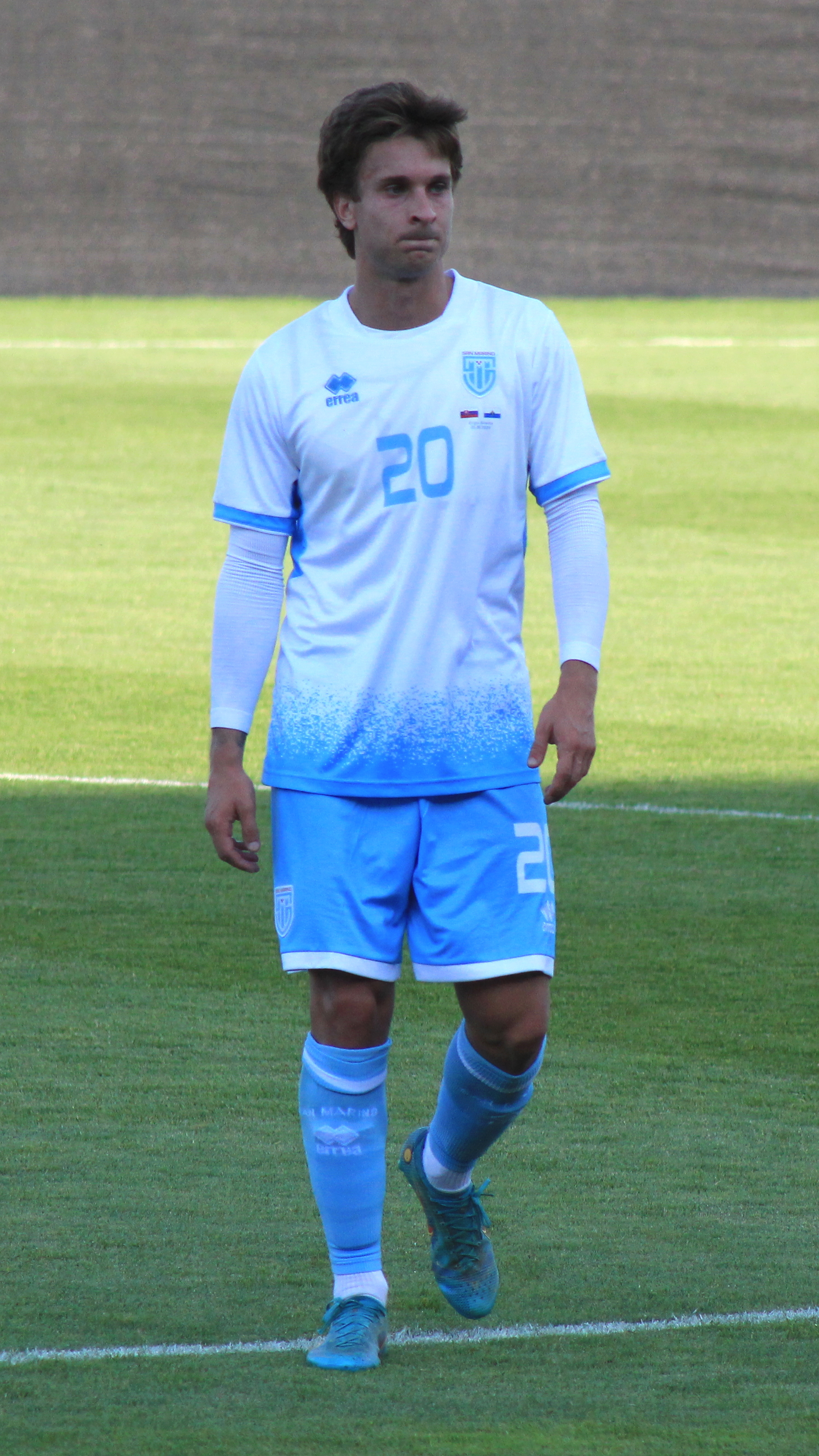
- Tosi with San Marino against Slovakia (2024)

Personal information
- Full name: Alessandro Tosi
- Date of birth: 28 April 2001 (age 25)
- Place of birth: San Marino
- Position: Defender

Team information
- Current team: Tropical Coriano

Youth career
- –2018: Cesena
- 2018–2019: Bologna

Senior career*
| Years | Team | Apps | (Gls) |
| 2019–2020 | Delta Porto Tolle | 10 | (0) |
| 2020–2021 | Vigasio | | |
| 2021–2022 | Correggese | 15 | (0) |
| 2022–2026 | Victor San Marino | 40 | (1) |
| 2026 | Lucchese | 0 | (0) |
| 2026– | Tropical Coriano | 10 | (0) |

International career^{‡}
| 2016 | San Marino U17 | 3 | (0) |
| 2019 | San Marino U19 | 1 | (0) |
| 2019–2022 | San Marino U21 | 10 | (0) |
| 2022– | San Marino | 36 | (0) |
- * Club domestic league appearances and goals as of 5 November 2026 ‡ National team caps and goals as of 15 November 2026

Alessandro Tosi (born 28 April 2001) is a Sammarinese professional footballer who plays as a defender for Tropical Coriano and the San Marino national team.

== International career ==
Tosi made his international debut for San Marino on 21 September 2022 in a friendly match against Seychelles, which finished as a 0–0 home draw.

== Career statistics ==
=== International ===
As of 15 November 2026

San Marino
| Year | Apps | Goals |
|---|---|---|
| 2022 | 4 | 0 |
| 2023 | 9 | 0 |
| 2024 | 9 | 0 |
| 2025 | 6 | 0 |
| 2026 | 8 | 0 |
| Total | 36 | 0 |

== Personal life ==
Tosi works as a digital marketing specialist while also playing football.
