= 2021 UEFA European Under-21 Championship qualification Group 9 =

Football tournament qualification stage

Group 9 of the 2021 UEFA European Under-21 Championship qualifying competition consisted of five teams: Germany, Belgium, Wales, Bosnia and Herzegovina, and Moldova. The composition of the nine groups in the qualifying group stage was decided by the draw held on 11 December 2018, 09:00 CET (UTC+1), at the UEFA headquarters in Nyon, Switzerland, with the teams seeded according to their coefficient ranking.

The group was originally scheduled to be played in home-and-away round-robin format between 26 March 2019 and 13 October 2020. Under the original format, the group winners and the best runners-up among all nine groups (not counting results against the sixth-placed team) would qualify directly for the final tournament, while the remaining eight runners-up would advance to the play-offs.

On 17 March 2020, all matches were put on hold due to the COVID-19 pandemic. On 17 June 2020, UEFA announced that the qualifying group stage would be extended and end on 17 November 2020, while the play-offs, originally scheduled to be played in November 2020, would be cancelled. Instead, the group winners and the five best runners-up among all nine groups (not counting results against the sixth-placed team) would qualify for the final tournament.

== Standings ==
Pos	Team	Pld	W	D	L	GF	GA	GD	Pts	Qualification	Germany	Belgium	Bosnia and Herzegovina	Wales	Moldova
1	Germany	8	6	0	2	22	10	+12	18	Final tournament	—	2–3	1–0	2–1	4–1
2	Belgium	8	4	1	3	18	9	+9	13		4–1	—	0–0	5–0	4–1
3	Bosnia and Herzegovina	8	3	2	3	9	7	+2	11		0–2	3–2	—	1–0	4–0
4	Wales	8	3	0	5	8	15	−7	9		1–5	1–0	1–0	—	3–0
5	Moldova	8	2	1	5	6	22	−16	7		0–5	1–0	1–1	2–1	—

Source: UEFA
Rules for classification: Tiebreakers

== Matches ==
Times are CET/CEST, (Note: CEST (UTC+2) for dates between 31 March and 26 October 2019 and between 29 March and 24 October 2020, and CET (UTC+1) for all other dates.) as listed by UEFA (local times, if different, are in parentheses).

26 March 2019
17:00

Bosnia and Herzegovina	4–0	Moldova
Šerbečić 23'; Mustedanagić 44', 55'; Ćavar 73'	Report

Stadion Grbavica, Sarajevo
Attendance: 336
Referee: Zbynek Proske (Czech Republic)

6 September 2019
18:00 (17:00 BST)

Wales	1–0	Belgium
Johnson 3'	Report

Racecourse Ground, Wrexham
Attendance: 304
Referee: Danilo Grujić (Serbia)

10 September 2019
20:00

Belgium	0–0	Bosnia and Herzegovina
	Report

Den Dreef, Leuven
Attendance: 823
Referee: Volen Chinkov (Bulgaria)
10 September 2019
20:00 (19:00 BST)

Wales	1–5	Germany
Harris 48' (pen.)	Report	Hack 19', 24', 29'; Eggestein 41'; Fein 50'

Racecourse Ground, Wrexham
Attendance: 841
Referee: Tomasz Musiał (Poland)

11 October 2019
16:00 (17:00 EEST)

Moldova	2–1	Wales
Belousov 41', 47' (pen.)	Report	Broadhead 24'

CSR Orhei, Orhei
Attendance: 350
Referee: Ümit Öztürk (Turkey)

15 October 2019
18:00

Bosnia and Herzegovina	0–2	Germany
	Report	Kilian 29'; Nmecha 79'

Bilino Polje Stadium, Zenica
Attendance: 2,500
Referee: Jens Maae (Denmark)
15 October 2019
20:00

Belgium	4–1	Moldova
Openda 9'; Antonucci 29'; Vanheusden 76'; Doku 90+1' (pen.)	Report	Cojocaru 33'

Den Dreef, Leuven
Attendance: 886
Referee: Kaspar Sjöberg (Sweden)

17 November 2019
16:00

Germany	2–3	Belgium
Schlotterbeck 38'; Ache 81'	Report	Vanheusden 26'; Openda 43', 70'

Schwarzwald-Stadion, Freiburg
Attendance: 16,504
Referee: Fábio José Costa Veríssimo (Portugal)
19 November 2019
17:00 (16:00 GMT)

Wales	1–0	Bosnia and Herzegovina
Cullen 71'	Report

Racecourse Ground, Wrexham
Attendance: 1.282
Referee: Georgios Kominis (Greece)

3 September 2020
18:15

Germany	4–1	Moldova
Berisha 11'; Nmecha 63' (pen.); Schlotterbeck 75'; Krüger 80'	Report	Carastoian 85'

Brita-Arena, Wiesbaden
Attendance: 0 (Note: Due to the COVID-19 pandemic in Europe, all matches scheduled for September 2020 were played behind closed doors.)
Referee: Nejc Kajzatović (Slovenia)
4 September 2020
16:30

Bosnia and Herzegovina	1–0	Wales
Resić 75'	Report

Bosnia and Herzegovina FA Training Centre, Zenica
Attendance: 0
Referee: Mykola Balakin (Ukraine)

8 September 2020
16:00

Belgium	4–1	Germany
Ndayishimiye 20', 60' (pen.); De Ketelaere 51'; Openda 77'	Report	Nmecha 32' (pen.)

Den Dreef, Leuven
Attendance: 0
Referee: Michael Fabbri (Italy)
8 September 2020
18:00 (19:00 EEST)

Moldova	1–1	Bosnia and Herzegovina
Crăciun 88' (pen.)	Report	Beganović 51'

Zimbru Stadium, Chișinău
Attendance: 0
Referee: Sebastian Gishamer (Austria)

9 October 2020
18:15 (19:15 EEST)

Moldova	0–5	Germany
	Report	Nmecha 19', 25' (pen.); Özcan 41'; Burkardt 67'; Kother 90+2'

Zimbru Stadium, Chișinău
Attendance: 0
Referee: Ferenc Karakó (Hungary)
9 October 2020
20:00

Belgium	5–0	Wales
Ndayishimiye 17' (pen.); Lokonga 20', 34'; Bataille 77'; Openda 81' (pen.)	Report

Den Dreef, Leuven
Attendance: 0
Referee: Emmanouil Skoulas (Greece)

13 October 2020
16:00 (17:00 EEST)

Moldova	1–0	Belgium
Furtună 38'	Report

Malaya Sportivnaya Arena, Tiraspol
Attendance: 0
Referee: Pavel Orel (Czech Republic)
13 October 2020
18:15

Germany	1–0	Bosnia and Herzegovina
Nmecha 29'	Report

Sportpark Ronhof Thomas Sommer, Fürth
Attendance: 0
Referee: Boris Marhefka (Slovakia)

13 November 2020 (Note: All matches originally scheduled to be played in March 2020 were postponed due to the COVID-19 pandemic in Europe. These matches were subsequently rescheduled to be played in November 2020.)
18:00 (17:00 GMT)

Wales	3–0	Moldova
Taylor 61'; Broadhead 77' (pen.); Touray 90+3'	Report

Racecourse Ground, Wrexham
Attendance: 0
Referee: Loukas Sotiriou (Cyprus)

17 November 2020
18:15

Germany	2–1	Wales
L. Nmecha 17' (pen.); Burkardt 26'	Report	Harris 34'

Eintracht-Stadion, Braunschweig
Attendance: 0
Referee: Arman Ismuratov (Kazakhstan)
17 November 2020
18:15

Bosnia and Herzegovina	3–2	Belgium
Savić 29'; Resić 31'; Kovač 70'	Report	De Smet 7'; Openda 90' (pen.)

Koševo City Stadium, Sarajevo
Attendance: 0
Referee: Yigal Frid (Israel)

== Goalscorers ==
There were 63 goals scored in 20 matches, for an average of 3.15 goals per match.

7 goals

- (Germany) Lukas Nmecha

6 goals

- (Belgium) Loïs Openda

3 goals

- (Belgium) Mike Ndayishimiye
- (Germany) Robin Hack

2 goals

- (Belgium) Albert Lokonga
- (Belgium) Zinho Vanheusden
- (Bosnia and Herzegovina) Zinedin Mustedanagić
- (Bosnia and Herzegovina) Ševkija Resić
- (Germany) Jonathan Burkardt
- (Germany) Nico Schlotterbeck
- (Moldova) Alexandr Belousov
- (Wales) Nathan Broadhead
- (Wales) Mark Harris

1 goal

- (Belgium) Francesco Antonucci
- (Belgium) Jelle Bataille
- (Belgium) Charles De Ketelaere
- (Belgium) Thibault De Smet
- (Belgium) Jérémy Doku
- (Bosnia and Herzegovina) Amar Beganović
- (Bosnia and Herzegovina) Marijan Ćavar
- (Bosnia and Herzegovina) Stefan Kovač
- (Bosnia and Herzegovina) Milan Savić
- (Bosnia and Herzegovina) Besim Šerbečić
- (Germany) Ragnar Ache
- (Germany) Mërgim Berisha
- (Germany) Johannes Eggestein
- (Germany) Adrian Fein
- (Germany) Luca Kilian
- (Germany) Dominik Kother
- (Germany) Florian Krüger
- (Germany) Salih Özcan
- (Moldova) Artiom Carastoian
- (Moldova) Maxim Cojocaru
- (Moldova) Artur Crăciun
- (Moldova) Denis Furtună
- (Wales) Liam Cullen
- (Wales) Brennan Johnson
- (Wales) Terry Taylor
- (Wales) Momodou Touray
