= 2021 UEFA European Under-21 Championship qualification =

Tournament details
- Dates: 20 March 2019 – 18 November 2020
- Teams: 53 (from 1 confederation)

Tournament statistics
- Matches played: 255
- Goals scored: 822 (3.22 per match)
- Attendance: 368,240 (1,444 per match)
- Top scorer: (England) Eddie Nketiah (13 goals)

The 2021 UEFA European Under-21 Championship qualifying competition was a men's under-21 football tournament that determined the 14 teams that would be joining the automatically qualified co-hosts Hungary and Slovenia in the 2021 UEFA European Under-21 Championship tournament final.

Apart from Hungary and Slovenia, all the remaining 53 UEFA member national teams entered the qualifying tournament. Players born on or after 1 January 1998 are eligible to participate.

== Format ==
The qualifying competition would originally consist of the following two rounds:

- Qualifying group stage: The 53 teams are drawn into nine groups: eight groups of six teams and one group of five teams. Each group is played in home-and-away round-robin format. The nine group winners and the best runners-up (not counting results against the sixth-placed team) qualify directly for the tournament final, while the remaining eight runners-up advance to the play-offs.
- Play-offs: The eight teams are drawn into four ties to play home-and-away two-legged matches to determine the last four qualified teams.

However, due to the COVID-19 pandemic in Europe which caused the postponement of matches in the qualifying group stage, UEFA announced on 17 June 2020 that the play-offs would be cancelled. Instead, the nine group winners and the five best runners-up (not counting results against the sixth-placed team) qualify for the tournament final.

=== Tiebreakers ===
In the qualifying group stage, teams are ranked according to points (3 points for a win, 1 point for a draw, 0 points for a loss), and if tied on points, the following tiebreaking criteria are applied, in the order given, to determine the rankings (Regulations Article 14.01):

1. Points in head-to-head matches among tied teams;
2. Goal difference in head-to-head matches among tied teams;
3. Goals scored in head-to-head matches among tied teams;
4. Away goals scored in head-to-head matches among tied teams;
5. If more than two teams are tied, and after applying all head-to-head criteria above, a subset of teams are still tied, all head-to-head criteria above are reapplied exclusively to this subset of teams;
6. Goal difference in all group matches;
7. Goals scored in all group matches;
8. Away goals scored in all group matches;
9. Wins in all group matches;
10. Away wins in all group matches;
11. Disciplinary points (red card = 3 points, yellow card = 1 point, expulsion for two yellow cards in one match = 3 points);
12. UEFA coefficient ranking for the qualifying group stage draw.

To determine the five best runners-up from the qualifying group stage, the results against the teams in sixth place are discarded. The following criteria are applied (Regulations Article 15.02):

1. Points;
2. Goal difference;
3. Goals scored;
4. Away goals scored;
5. Wins;
6. Away wins;
7. Disciplinary points;
8. UEFA coefficient ranking for the qualifying group stage draw.

=== Effects of the COVID-19 pandemic ===
Due to the COVID-19 pandemic in Europe, the UEFA Executive Committee approved on 28 August 2020 the following principles for the qualifying phase of the 2021 UEFA European Under-21 Championship:

- If a team cannot field the minimum required number of players (at least 13 players including at least one goalkeeper) due to positive SARS-CoV-2 tests and the match cannot be rescheduled, the team responsible for the match not taking place are considered to have forfeited the match and lost 0–3.
- If UEFA comes to the conclusion that both or none of the teams are responsible for the match not taking place, the outcome of the match will be decided by drawing of lots, either home win 1–0, home loss 0–1 or draw 0–0, carried out by the UEFA administration.

== Schedule ==
The qualifying matches were played on dates that fell within the FIFA International Match Calendar. The qualifying group stage was originally to end in October 2020, but was extended to November 2020 due to the postponement of the matches in March 2020. The play-offs, originally scheduled to be played between 9–17 November 2020, were cancelled.

Stage	Draw date	FIFA International Dates
Qualifying group stage	11 December 2018	18–26 March 2019
Qualifying group stage	11 December 2018	3–11 June 2019
Qualifying group stage	11 December 2018	2–10 September 2019
Qualifying group stage	11 December 2018	7–15 October 2019
Qualifying group stage	11 December 2018	11–19 November 2019
Qualifying group stage	11 December 2018	~~23–31 March 2020~~ (matches not played due to COVID-19 pandemic)
Qualifying group stage	11 December 2018	31 August – 8 September 2020
Qualifying group stage	11 December 2018	5–13 October 2020
Qualifying group stage	11 December 2018	9–18 November 2020 (new dates for matches postponed due to COVID-19 pandemic)

== Qualifying group stage ==
=== Draw ===
The draw for the qualifying group stage was held on 11 December 2018, 09:00 CET (UTC+1), at the UEFA headquarters in Nyon, Switzerland.

The teams were seeded according to their coefficient ranking, calculated based on the following:

- 2015 UEFA European Under-21 Championship tournament final and qualifying competition (20%)
- 2017 UEFA European Under-21 Championship tournament final and qualifying competition (40%)
- 2019 UEFA European Under-21 Championship qualifying competition (40%)

Each group contained one team from each of Pots A–F (Pots A–E for five-team group). Based on the decisions taken by the UEFA Emergency Panel, Spain and Gibraltar, and Serbia and Kosovo would not be drawn in the same group.

tournament final co-hosts
Team
**Hungary**
**Slovenia**

Teams entering qualifying group stage
Pot A Team **Germany** **England** **Spain** **Portugal** **Denmark** **France** **Italy** Serbia **Croatia**	Pot B Team Austria Sweden Belgium Slovakia Poland **Romania** **Czech Republic** **Netherlands** Israel	Pot C Team Greece Ukraine Norway **Russia** Turkey **Iceland** Wales **Switzerland** Montenegro
Pot D Team Bulgaria Finland Republic of Ireland Georgia Kosovo Scotland North Macedonia Belarus Bosnia and Herzegovina	Pot E Team Northern Ireland Albania Moldova Lithuania Kazakhstan Latvia Azerbaijan Armenia Cyprus	Pot F Team Luxembourg Malta Estonia Faroe Islands Gibraltar Andorra San Marino Liechtenstein

Notes

- Teams marked in **bold** qualified for the tournament final.

=== Groups ===
==== Group 1 ====
Pos	Team	Pld	W	D	L	GF	GA	GD	Pts	Qualification	Italy	Iceland	Ireland	Sweden	Armenia	Luxembourg
1	Italy	10	8	1	1	27	5	+22	25	Final tournament	—	3–0	2–0	4–1	6–0	5–0
2	Iceland	10	7	0	3	19	12	+7	21	Final tournament	1–2	—	1–0	1–0	6–1	3–0
3	Republic of Ireland	10	6	1	3	15	8	+7	19		0–0	1–2	—	4–1	1–0	3–0
4	Sweden	10	6	0	4	31	12	+19	18		3–0	5–0	1–3	—	10–0	4–0
5	Armenia	10	1	0	9	4	33	−29	3 (Note: Ranked on head-to-head goal difference: Armenia +1, Luxembourg −1.)		0–1	0–3 (Note: The Armenia v Iceland match was awarded as a 3–0 win to Iceland after being cancelled as Armenia could not travel to the match due to positive SARS-CoV-2 tests in the team.)	0–1	0–3 (Note: The Armenia v Sweden match was awarded as a 3–0 win to Sweden after being cancelled as Armenia could not travel to the match due to positive SARS-CoV-2 tests in the team.)	—	2–0
6	Luxembourg	10	1	0	9	3	29	−26	3		0–4	0–2	1–2	0–3	2–1	—

Source: UEFA

==== Group 2 ====
Pos	Team	Pld	W	D	L	GF	GA	GD	Pts	Qualification	France	Switzerland	Georgia	Slovakia	Azerbaijan	Liechtenstein
1	France	10	9	0	1	32	10	+22	27	Final tournament	—	3–1	3–2	1–0	5–0	5–0
2	Switzerland	10	9	0	1	26	8	+18	27	Final tournament	3–1	—	2–1	4–1	2–1	3–0
3	Georgia	10	5	0	5	17	14	+3	15		0–2	0–3	—	2–1	1–0	4–0
4	Slovakia	10	4	0	6	22	21	+1	12		3–5	1–2	3–2	—	2–1	6–0
5	Azerbaijan	10	2	0	8	6	18	−12	6		1–2	0–1	0–3	2–1	—	1–0
6	Liechtenstein	10	1	0	9	3	35	−32	3		0–5	0–5	0–2	2–4	1–0	—

Source: UEFA

==== Group 3 ====
Pos	Team	Pld	W	D	L	GF	GA	GD	Pts	Qualification	England	Austria	Albania	Turkey	Kosovo	Andorra
1	England	10	9	1	0	34	9	+25	28	Final tournament	—	5–1	5–0	2–1	2–0	3–1
2	Austria	10	6	0	4	24	16	+8	18		1–2	—	1–5	3–0	4–0	4–0
3	Albania	10	4	2	4	16	21	−5	14		0–3	0–4	—	1–2	2–1	3–1
4	Turkey	10	4	1	5	15	18	−3	13		2–3	3–2	2–2	—	3–0	1–0
5	Kosovo	10	3	0	7	9	20	−11	9		0–6	0–1	0–1	3–1	—	1–0
6	Andorra	10	1	2	7	10	24	−14	5		3–3	1–3	2–2	2–0	0–4	—

Source: UEFA

==== Group 4 ====
Pos	Team	Pld	W	D	L	GF	GA	GD	Pts	Qualification	Czech Republic	Croatia	Scotland	Greece	Lithuania	San Marino
1	Czech Republic	10	6	3	1	20	4	+16	21	Final tournament	—	0–0	0–0	1–1	2–0	6–0
2	Croatia	10	6	2	2	37	7	+30	20	Final tournament	1–2	—	1–2	5–0	7–0	10–0
3	Scotland	10	5	3	2	16	5	+11	18		2–0	2–2	—	0–1	0–0	2–0
4	Greece	10	5	1	4	10	11	−1	16		0–2	0–1	1–0	—	1–0	5–0
5	Lithuania	10	3	1	6	9	15	−6	10		0–1	1–3	0–1	2–0	—	3–0
6	San Marino	10	0	0	10	0	50	−50	0		0–6	0–7	0–7	0–1	0–3	—

Source: UEFA

==== Group 5 ====
Pos	Team	Pld	W	D	L	GF	GA	GD	Pts	Qualification	Russia	Poland	Bulgaria	Serbia	Estonia	Latvia
1	Russia	10	7	2	1	22	4	+18	23	Final tournament	—	2–2	2–0	1–0	4–0	2−0
2	Poland	10	6	2	2	19	8	+11	20		1–0	—	1–1	1–0	4–0	3–1
3	Bulgaria	10	5	3	2	14	5	+9	18		0–0	3−0	—	0–1	3–0	1–0
4	Serbia	10	3	3	4	12	9	+3	12		0–2	1–0	1–2	—	6−0	1–1
5	Estonia	10	1	2	7	3	34	−31	5		0–5	0–6	0–4	0–0	—	2–1
6	Latvia	10	0	4	6	7	17	−10	4		1–4	0–1	0–0	2–2	1–1	—

Source: UEFA

==== Group 6 ====
Pos	Team	Pld	W	D	L	GF	GA	GD	Pts	Qualification	Spain	North Macedonia	Israel	Kazakhstan	Faroe Islands	Montenegro
1	Spain	10	9	1	0	20	1	+19	28	Final tournament	—	3–0	3–0	3–0	2–0	2–0
2	North Macedonia	10	5	3	2	20	12	+8	18		0–1	—	1–1	1–1	7–1	2–1
3	Israel	10	3	4	3	12	14	−2	13		1–1	1–1	—	1–2	3–1	0–0
4	Kazakhstan	10	3	1	6	12	21	−9	10		0–1	1–4	1–2	—	2–3	0–4
5	Faroe Islands	10	3	0	7	11	25	−14	9		0–2	1–2	3–1	1–3	—	1–0
6	Montenegro	10	2	1	7	11	13	−2	7		0–2	1–2	1–2	1–2	3–0	—

Source: UEFA

==== Group 7 ====
Pos	Team	Pld	W	D	L	GF	GA	GD	Pts	Qualification	Netherlands	Portugal	Norway	Belarus	Cyprus	Gibraltar
1	Netherlands	10	9	0	1	46	5	+41	27 (Note: Ranked on head-to-head goal difference: Netherlands +1, Portugal −1.)	Final tournament	—	4–2	2–0	5–0	5–1	5–0
2	Portugal	10	9	0	1	29	9	+20	27	Final tournament	2–1	—	4–1	3–0	2–1	4–0
3	Norway	8	3	1	4	14	16	−2	10		0–4	2–3	—	Canc.	2–1	6–0
4	Belarus	9	2	2	5	15	21	−6	8		0–7	0–2	1–1	—	1–2	10–0
5	Cyprus	9	2	1	6	8	24	−16	7		0–7	0–4	1–2	1–1	—	1–0
6	Gibraltar	8	0	0	8	0	37	−37	0		0–6	0–3	Canc.	0–2	Canc.	—

==== Group 8 ====
Pos	Team	Pld	W	D	L	GF	GA	GD	Pts	Qualification	Denmark	Romania	Ukraine	Finland		Malta
1	Denmark	10	8	2	0	21	9	+12	26	Final tournament	—	2–1	1–1	2–1	2–1	5–1
2	Romania	10	6	2	2	22	7	+15	20	Final tournament	1–1	—	3–0	4–1	3–0	4–1
3	Ukraine	10	5	1	4	17	11	+6	16		2–3	1–0	—	0–2	3–0	4–0
4	Finland	10	4	1	5	14	15	−1	13		0–1	1–3	0–2	—	1–1	4–0
5	Northern Ireland	10	2	3	5	7	13	−6	9		0–1	0–0	1–0	2–3	—	0–0
6	Malta	10	0	1	9	4	30	−26	1		1–3	0–3	1–4	0–1	0–2	—

Source: UEFA

==== Group 9 ====
Pos	Team	Pld	W	D	L	GF	GA	GD	Pts	Qualification	Germany	Belgium	Bosnia and Herzegovina	Wales	Moldova
1	Germany	8	6	0	2	22	10	+12	**18**	Final tournament	—	2–3	1–0	2–1	4–1
2	Belgium	8	4	1	3	18	9	+9	**13**		4–1	—	0–0	5–0	4–1
3	Bosnia and Herzegovina	8	3	2	3	9	7	+2	**11**		0–2	3–2	—	1–0	4–0
4	Wales	8	3	0	5	8	15	−7	**9**		1–5	1–0	1–0	—	3–0
5	Moldova	8	2	1	5	6	22	−16	**7**		0–5	1–0	1–1	2–1	—

Source: UEFA

=== Ranking of second-placed teams ===
To determine the five best second-placed teams from the qualifying group stage which qualified to the tournament final, only the results of the second-placed teams against the first, third, fourth and fifth-placed teams in their group were taken into account, while results against the sixth-placed team in six-team groups were not included. As a result, eight matches played by each second-placed team were counted for the purposes of determining the ranking.

Pos	Grp	Team	Pld	W	D	L	GF	GA	GD	Pts	Qualification
1	7	Portugal	8	7	0	1	22	9	+13	21	tournament final
2	2	Switzerland	8	7	0	1	18	8	+10	21	tournament final
3	1	Iceland	8	5	0	3	14	12	+2	15	tournament final
4	4	Croatia	8	4	2	2	20	7	+13	14	tournament final
5	8	Romania	8	4	2	2	15	6	+9	14	tournament final
6	5	Poland	8	4	2	2	15	7	+8	14	
7	9	Belgium	8	4	1	3	18	9	+9	13	
8	6	North Macedonia	8	3	3	2	16	10	+6	12	
9	3	Austria	8	4	0	4	17	15	+2	12	

Source: UEFA
Rules for classification: 1) points; 2) goal difference; 3) goals scored; 4) away goals scored; 5) wins; 6) away wins; 7) disciplinary points; 8) coefficient ranking.

== Play-offs ==
The draw for the play-offs, to decide the matchups and the order of legs, was intended to be held on 16 October 2020 at the UEFA headquarters in Nyon, Switzerland. The matches were intended to be played between 9–17 November 2020, with the four play-off winners qualifying for the tournament final. However, the play-offs were cancelled due to the COVID-19 pandemic.

== Qualified teams ==
The following 16 teams qualified for the tournament final.

Team	Qualified as	Qualified on	Previous appearances in U21 Euro^{1} only U21 era (since 1978)
Hungary	Co-hosts	3 December 2018	4 (1978, 1980, 1986, 1996)
Slovenia	Co-hosts	3 December 2018	0 (debut)
Italy	Group 1 winners	15 November 2020	20 (1978, 1980, 1982, 1984, 1986, 1988, 1990, **1992**, **1994**, **1996**, **2000**, 2002, **2004**, 2006, 2007, 2009, 2013, 2015, 2017, 2019)
France	Group 2 winners	12 November 2020	9 (1982, 1984, 1986, **1988**, 1994, 1996, 2002, 2006, 2019)
England	Group 3 winners	13 October 2020	15 (1978, 1980, **1982**, **1984**, 1986, 1988, 2000, 2002, 2007, 2009, 2011, 2013, 2015, 2017, 2019)
Czech Republic	Group 4 winners	17 November 2020	13 (1978^{2}, 1980^{2}, 1988^{2}, 1990^{2}, 1992^{2}, 1994^{2}, 1996, 2000, **2002**, 2007, 2011, 2015, 2017)
Russia	Group 5 winners	13 October 2020	6 (**1980**^{3}, 1982^{3}, **1990**^{3}, 1994, 1998, 2013)
Spain	Group 6 winners	13 October 2020	14 (1982, 1984, **1986**, 1988, 1990, 1994, 1996, **1998**, 2000, 2009, **2011**, **2013**, 2017, **2019**)
Netherlands	Group 7 winners	13 October 2020	8 (1988, 1990, 1992, 1998, 2000, **2006**, **2007**, 2013)
Denmark	Group 8 winners	13 October 2020	8 (1978, 1986, 1992, 2006, 2011, 2015, 2017, 2019)
Germany	Group 9 winners	17 November 2020	12 (1982^{4}, 1990^{4}, 1992, 1996, 1998, 2004, 2006, **2009**, 2013, 2015, **2017**, 2019)
Portugal	1st best runners-up	15 November 2020	8 (1994, 1996, 2002, 2004, 2006, 2007, 2015, 2017)
Switzerland	2nd best runners-up	13 October 2020	3 (2002, 2004, 2011)
Iceland	3rd best runners-up	24 November 2020	1 (2011)
Croatia	4th best runners-up	17 November 2020	3 (2000, 2004, 2019)
Romania	5th best runners-up	17 November 2020	2 (1998, 2019)

^{1} Bold indicates champions for that year. Italic indicates hosts for that year.
^{2} As Czechoslovakia
^{3} As Soviet Union
^{4} As West Germany

== Top goalscorers ==
There were 822 goals scored in 255 matches, for an average of 3.22 goals per match.

13 goals

- (England) Eddie Nketiah

11 goals

- (France) Odsonne Édouard

10 goals

- (Netherlands) Dani de Wit

9 goals

- (Switzerland) Andi Zeqiri

8 goals

- (Netherlands) Myron Boadu
- (Netherlands) Kaj Sierhuis

7 goals

- (Croatia) Luka Ivanušec
- (Denmark) Andreas Skov Olsen
- (Germany) Lukas Nmecha
- (Turkey) Halil Dervişoğlu

6 goals

- (Belgium) Loïs Openda
- (Italy) Gianluca Scamacca
- (Sweden) Jesper Karlsson

For full lists of goalscorers, see sections in each group:

- Group 1
- Group 2
- Group 3
- Group 4
- Group 5
- Group 6
- Group 7
- Group 8
- Group 9
