= 2020–21 AC Monza season =

Monza
2020–21 season
- President: Paolo Berlusconi
- Head coach: Cristian Brocchi
- Stadium: Stadio Brianteo
- Serie B: 3rd
- Promotion play-offs: Semi-finals
- Coppa Italia: Fourth round
- Top goalscorer: League: Davide Frattesi (8); All: Davide Frattesi (8)
- Highest home attendance: 956 (vs. SPAL, 25 September)
- Lowest home attendance: 439 (vs. Triestina, 29 September)
- Average home league attendance: 688
Home colours	Away colours

The 2020–21 season was AC Monza's 39th season—and first in 19 years—in Serie B, the second tier of Italian football. The season began on 25 September 2020 and ended on 20 May 2021, under head coach Cristian Brocchi. Monza finished third in the Serie B regular season, nine points behind champions Empoli, with a record of 17 wins, 13 draws, and 8 defeats. Qualifying directly for the promotion play-off semi-finals, they were eliminated by Cittadella 3–2 on aggregate. In the Coppa Italia, Monza advanced past Triestina and Pordenone before losing 2–0 to SPAL in the fourth round.

Ahead of their return to the second tier, Monza brought in 13 first-team players during the summer transfer window—including Kevin-Prince Boateng, Christian Gytkjær, and Davide Frattesi—and added five more in the winter, most notably Mario Balotelli. Thirty-five different players represented the club across the regular season, play-offs, and Coppa Italia, with 19 different goalscorers. Midfielder Frattesi finished as both Monza's top goalscorer, with eight goals in Serie B, and their most-used player, making 41 appearances in all competitions.

== Background ==
Having won Group A of the 2019–20 Serie C under head coach Cristian Brocchi, Monza were promoted back to Serie B—the second tier of Italian football—after a 19-year absence. The club was owned by Silvio Berlusconi's holding company Fininvest, with his brother Paolo Berlusconi serving as president and Adriano Galliani as chief executive officer. Silvio Berlusconi and Galliani had previously led AC Milan for 31 years, winning 29 major trophies together. Ahead of the new campaign, Monza's home ground, the Stadio Brianteo, was commercially renamed the U-Power Stadium on 4 September 2020.

== Pre-season friendlies ==
On 5 September 2020, Monza opened their pre-season with a friendly against Serie A side AC Milan at the San Siro. Davide Calabria gave Milan the lead with a shot from outside the box in the 6th minute of play. In the 23rd minute, Mattia Finotto levelled the score after beating goalkeeper Antonio Donnarumma one-on-one. Three goals by Daniel Maldini, Pierre Kalulu, and Lorenzo Colombo gave Milan the 4–1 win.

Monza played three more friendlies: a 2–1 win against Lecco, won thanks to an 86th-minute goal by new signing Mirko Marić, a 1–1 draw against Vicenza, in which Finotto scored Monza's goal, and a 1–0 win against Alessandria, with new signing Christian Gytkjær scoring the lone goal of the game. As a result of the COVID-19 pandemic, all four friendlies were played behind closed doors.

Results list Monza's goal tally first.

Date	Opponent	Venue	Result	Scorers
5 September 2020	AC Milan	Away	1–4	Finotto 23'
8 September 2020	Lecco	Home	2–1	Mosti 10', Marić 86'
11 September 2020	Vicenza	Neutral	1–1	Finotto 27'
18 September 2020	Alessandria	Home	1–0	Gytkjær 67'

== Serie B ==
=== Overview ===
Monza began their Serie B campaign in September with a 0–0 draw at home to newly relegated SPAL, with Gytkjær missing a penalty for Monza. In October two more draws ensued: another goalless draw, against Empoli, and a 1–1 draw to Pisa, with Davide Frattesi scoring Monza's first goal in Serie B in 19 years. Monza's first defeat of the season came in the form of a 2–1 defeat at home against ChievoVerona, where Monza's Antonino Barillà was sent off in the 43rd minute. Monza recorded their first league win of the season away to Cittadella, winning 2–1 through two penalties. In November the team won their second league game in a row, beating Frosinone 2–0 at home. Following a two-week pause for national team fixtures, Monza drew 1–1 away to Pordenone, then won 1–0 at home to a 10-man Reggina.

In December Monza drew 1–1 to Vicenza in a match postponed due to the COVID-19 pandemic, and then lost their second game of the season away to Reggiana in a 3–0 defeat. Monza rebounded from their previous defeat, defeating Venezia 2–0 away from home, and Virtus Entella 5–0 at home in their largest victory of the season through braces by Kevin-Prince Boateng and Mario Sampirisi. The two wins were followed by a 3–2 defeat away from home to Pescara, with Monza's Filippo Scaglia being sent off in the 62nd minute. Former Pescara player Davide Bettella scored two goals for Monza. Following their defeat, Monza beat Ascoli 2–0 at home, and Cremonese 2–0 away. They then beat league leaders Salernitana 3–0 at home, with new signing Mario Balotelli scoring a goal. Monza moved up to third place before the end of 2020.

Monza started 2021 with a 0–0 draw to Lecce. After a two-week break, they wasted a 2–0 lead to 16th-placed Cosenza, conceding two goals to draw 2–2. Monza finished the first leg with a 1–0 away win over cross-region rivals Brescia, climbing to second place. In the second leg, Monza drew 1–1 away to SPAL, and drew by the same result at home against league-leaders Empoli in February. They then returned to victory by beating Vicenza 2–1 away from home, before Pisa interrupted their nine-game unbeaten streak, losing 2–0 at home. Monza rebounded from their defeat by beating Chievo 1–0 away, returning to second place, then drew 0–0 at home to Cittadella. In March they drew 2–2 away to Frosinone, before returning to win at home for the first time in over two months, beating Pordenone 2–0. Monza then lost 1–0 to 14th-placed Reggina away from home, beat Reggiana 2–0 at home, and lost to Venezia 4–1, also at home, through a Mattia Aramu hat-trick.

Monza began April with two 1–1 draws to the two bottom-placed teams, Virtus Entella and Pescara, and a 1–0 defeat to 17th-placed Ascoli. They then returned to victory after four games, beating Cremonese 2–1 at home. In May, fourth-placed Monza played their last four games of the regular season against Salernitana and Lecce, respectively in third and second place, Brescia and Cosenza. By winning the first two games, 3–1 and 1–0 respectively, Monza shortened the gap with their opponents and climbed to third place, on par with Lecce and two points from Salernitana in second place. They finished in third place in the regular season, after beating Cosenza 3–0 and losing to Brescia 2–0, qualifying to the promotion play-offs semi-finals.

=== Matches ===
Results list Monza's goal tally first.

Date	Opponent	Venue	Result	Scorers	Attendance	Position
25 September 2020	SPAL	Home	0–0		956	13th
3 October 2020	Empoli	Away	0–0		669	13th
20 October 2020	Pisa	Away	1–1	Frattesi 46'	549	13th
24 October 2020	ChievoVerona	Home	1–2	Boateng 29' (pen.)	670	15th
31 October 2020	Cittadella	Away	2–1	Boateng 10' (pen.), Gytkjær 18' (pen.)	0	11th
7 November 2020	Frosinone	Home	2–0	Gytkjær 51', Mota 70'	0	9th
21 November 2020	Pordenone	Away	1–1	Marić 56'	0	9th
28 November 2020	Reggina	Home	1–0	Mota 54'	0	9th
2 December 2020	Vicenza	Home	1–1	Marić 18'	0	9th
6 December 2020	Reggiana	Away	0–3		0	9th
11 December 2020	Venezia	Away	2–0	Carlos 63', Mota 90'	0	7th
15 December 2020	Virtus Entella	Home	5–0	Boateng (2) 10', 29', Mota 73', Sampirisi (2) 82', 90'	0	8th
19 December 2020	Pescara	Away	2–3	Bettella (2) 26', 84'	0	8th
22 December 2020	Ascoli	Home	2–0	Carlos 34', Frattesi 88'	0	6th
27 December 2020	Cremonese	Away	2–0	Barillà 14', Frattesi 76'	0	4th
30 December 2020	Salernitana	Home	3–0	Balotelli 4', Barillà 45', Armellino 90+5'	0	3rd
4 January 2021	Lecce	Away	0–0		0	3rd
16 January 2021	Cosenza	Home	2–2	Barillà 8', Gytkjær 26'	0	4th
25 January 2021	Brescia	Away	1–0	Frattesi 55'	0	2nd
31 January 2021	SPAL	Away	1–1	Gytkjær 13'	0	2nd
6 February 2021	Empoli	Home	1–1	Boateng 70' (pen.)	0	2nd
9 February 2021	Vicenza	Away	2–1	Mota 82', D'Alessandro 85'	0	2nd
12 February 2021	Pisa	Home	0–2		0	3rd
20 February 2021	ChievoVerona	Away	1–0	Balotelli 60'	0	2nd
27 February 2021	Cittadella	Home	0–0		0	2nd
2 March 2021	Frosinone	Away	2–2	Paletta 19', Gytkjær 43'	0	3rd
6 March 2021	Pordenone	Home	2–0	Frattesi 26', Gytkjær 62' (pen.)	0	2nd
13 March 2021	Reggina	Away	0–1		0	2nd
16 March 2021	Reggiana	Home	2–0	Carlos 12', Colpani 84'	0	2nd
20 March 2021	Venezia	Home	1–4	Armellino 58'	0	4th
2 April 2021	Virtus Entella	Away	1–1	Scaglia 88'	0	3rd
5 April 2021	Pescara	Home	1–1	Frattesi 23'	0	4th
10 April 2021	Ascoli	Away	0–1		0	5th
17 April 2021	Cremonese	Home	2–1	Frattesi 34', Mota 38'	0	4th
1 May 2021	Salernitana	Away	3–1	Frattesi 49', Balotelli (2) 81', 90'+1'	0	4th
4 May 2021	Lecce	Home	1–0	Barberis 41'	0	3rd
7 May 2021	Cosenza	Away	3–0	Balotelli 73', D'Errico 82', Diaw 88'	0	3rd
10 May 2021	Brescia	Home	0–2		0	3rd

=== League table ===
Pos	Team	Pld	W	D	L	GF	GA	GD	Pts	Promotion, qualification or relegation
1	Empoli (C, P)	38	19	16	3	68	35	+33	73	Promotion to Serie A
2	Salernitana (P)	38	19	12	7	46	34	+12	69	Promotion to Serie A
3	Monza	38	17	13	8	51	33	+18	64	Qualification for promotion play-offs semi-finals
4	Lecce	38	16	14	8	68	47	+21	62	Qualification for promotion play-offs semi-finals
5	Venezia (O, P)	38	15	14	9	53	39	+14	59	Qualification for promotion play-offs preliminary round

Source: Lega Serie B (in Italian), Soccerway (in English)
Rules for classification: 1) Points; 2) Head-to-head points; 3) Head-to-head goal difference; 4) Goal difference; 5) Goals scored; 6) Draw.
(C) Champions; (O) Play-off winners; (P) Promoted

== Serie B promotion play-offs ==
=== Overview ===
Having finished the regular season in third place, Monza gained direct access to the semi-finals of the promotion play-offs. Monza played on 17 and 20 May 2021 against Cittadella, who beat Brescia in the previous round. In the first leg of the semi-finals, Cittadella won 3–0 through an Enrico Baldini hat-trick. Needing to win by at least three goals at home, Monza took the lead in the 58th minute through a Mario Balotelli goal, before Marco D'Alessandro doubled the lead 20 minutes later. The match ended 2–0, and Monza were eliminated from the play-offs.

=== Matches ===
Results list Monza's goal tally first.

Date	Round	Opponent	Venue	Result	Scorers	Attendance
17 May 2021	Semi-final	Cittadella	Away	0–3		0
20 May 2021	Semi-final	Cittadella	Home	2–0	Balotelli 58', D'Alessandro 78'	0

=== Bracket ===
Preliminary round
6	Cittadella	1
7	Brescia	0
5	Venezia (a.e.t.)	3
8	Chievo	2

Semi-finals
6	Cittadella	3	0	3
3	Monza	0	2	2
5	Venezia	1	1	2
4	Lecce	0	1	1

Final
6	Cittadella	0	1	1
5	Venezia	1	1	2

== Coppa Italia ==
As a Serie B side, Monza entered the Coppa Italia in the second round. In their opening match on 29 September, Monza hosted Triestina and won 3–0. They then faced Pordenone away in the third round on 27 October. Despite being reduced to 10 men in the 41st minute, after Edoardo Colferai received his second yellow card, Monza held on to a goalless draw, with the scoreline remaining the same after extra time. In the penalty shoot-out, Daniele Sommariva saved two penalties to help Monza advance to the next round. Monza played the fourth round on 24 November against SPAL; second-half goals by Alberto Paloschi and Enrico Brignola eliminated Monza from the competition.

Results list Monza's goal tally first.

Date	Round	Opponent	Venue	Result	Scorers	Attendance
29 September 2020	Second round	Triestina	Home	3–0	Barillà 23', Mota 77', Machín (pen.)	439
27 October 2020	Third round	Pordenone	Away	0–0 (a.e.t.); 4–1 (p)		0
25 November 2020	Fourth round	SPAL	Away	0–2		0

== Player details ==
As of match played 20 May 2021

No.	Pos	Nat	Player	Total		Serie B		Serie B play-offs		Coppa Italia	
No.	Pos	Nat	Player	Apps	Goals	Apps	Goals	Apps	Goals	Apps	Goals
1	GK	(Italy) ITA	Eugenio Lamanna	8	0	8	0	0	0	0	0
2	DF	(Italy) ITA	Giulio Donati	28	0	25+3	0	0	0	0	0
3	DF	(Italy) ITA	Armando Anastasio	3	0	0+2	0	0	0	0+1	0
4	MF	(Italy) ITA	Nicola Rigoni	2	0	0+1	0	0	0	1	0
5	MF	(Italy) ITA	Marco Fossati	13	0	7+3	0	0	0	3	0
6	DF	(Italy) ITA	Giuseppe Bellusci	33	0	29+1	0	1	0	1+1	0
7	MF	(Ghana) GHA	Kevin-Prince Boateng	25	5	23+1	5	1	0	0	0
8	MF	(Italy) ITA	Andrea Barberis	37	1	20+13	1	1+1	0	0+2	0
9	FW	(Denmark) DEN	Christian Gytkjær	24	6	19+3	6	0+1	0	0+1	0
10	MF	(Italy) ITA	Andrea D'Errico (c)	31	1	10+17	1	0+1	0	2+1	0
11	FW	(Italy) ITA	Mattia Finotto	5	0	2+2	0	0	0	1	0
12	GK	(Italy) ITA	Daniele Sommariva	4	0	3	0	0	0	1	0
16	MF	(Italy) ITA	Davide Frattesi	41	8	28+9	8	2	0	1+1	0
18	DF	(Italy) ITA	Davide Bettella	19	2	16+1	2	1	0	1	0
19	DF	(Italy) ITA	Filippo Scaglia	12	1	8+1	1	0+1	0	2	0
20	MF	(Italy) ITA	Antonino Barillà	30	4	19+8	3	0	0	3	1
21	MF	(Italy) ITA	Marco Armellino	30	2	15+12	2	1	0	1+1	0
22	GK	(Italy) ITA	Michele Di Gregorio	31	0	27	0	2	0	2	0
23	MF	(Italy) ITA	Matteo Scozzarella	15	0	11+3	0	1	0	0	0
24	FW	(Croatia) CRO	Mirko Marić	23	2	6+15	2	0	0	1+1	0
27	FW	(Italy) ITA	Federico Ricci	11	0	4+7	0	0	0	0	0
28	MF	(Italy) ITA	Andrea Colpani	27	1	11+12	1	2	0	2	0
29	DF	(Italy) ITA	Gabriel Paletta	21	1	17+3	1	1	0	0	0
30	DF	(Brazil) BRA	Carlos Augusto	33	3	29+1	3	2	0	1	0
31	DF	(Italy) ITA	Mario Sampirisi	28	2	19+5	2	2	0	1+1	0
32	DF	(Italy) ITA	Franco Lepore	5	0	2+1	0	0	0	2	0
35	MF	(Italy) ITA	Luca Lombardi	1	0	0	0	0	0	0+1	0
45	FW	(Italy) ITA	Mario Balotelli	14	6	5+7	5	1+1	1	0	0
47	FW	(Portugal) POR	Dany Mota	36	7	28+5	6	2	0	1	1
49	FW	(Italy) ITA	Luigi Caccavo (Note: Youth player)	0	0	0	0	0	0	0	0
60	FW	(Italy) ITA	Sabino Signorile	0	0	0	0	0	0	0	0
61	DF	(Italy) ITA	Pietro Saio	0	0	0	0	0	0	0	0
62	GK	(Italy) ITA	Andrea Mazza	0	0	0	0	0	0	0	0
63	GK	(Italy) ITA	Stefano Rubbi	0	0	0	0	0	0	0	0
64	GK	(Italy) ITA	Gianluca Ravarelli	0	0	0	0	0	0	0	0
66	FW	(Italy) ITA	Davide Diaw	20	1	10+8	1	1+1	0	0	0
67	FW	(Italy) ITA	Edoardo Colferai	1	0	0	0	0	0	1	0
68	MF	(Italy) ITA	Simone Achille Giosuè	0	0	0	0	0	0	0	0
69	DF	(Italy) ITA	Giuseppe Amato	0	0	0	0	0	0	0	0
70	MF	(Italy) ITA	Danilo Magli	0	0	0	0	0	0	0	0
71	MF	(Italy) ITA	Andrea Robbiati	0	0	0	0	0	0	0	0
77	FW	(Italy) ITA	Marco D'Alessandro	18	2	5+11	1	0+2	1	0	0
77	FW	(Croatia) CRO	Antonio Marin	7	0	0+6	0	0	0	1	0
98	DF	(Italy) ITA	Lorenzo Pirola	16	0	11+1	0	2	0	2	0
99	MF	(Equatorial Guinea) GEQ	José Machín	12	1	5+5	0	0	0	2	1

== Transfers ==
=== Summer ===
==== In ====
Arrivals
Date	Pos.	Name	From	Type	Fee	Ref.
9 June 2020	MF	(Italy) Andrea Barberis	Crotone	Free transfer	N/A	
22 July 2020	FW	(Denmark) Christian Gytkjær	(Poland) Lech Poznań	Free transfer	N/A	
11 August 2020	FW	(Croatia) Mirko Marić	(Croatia) Osijek	Permanent	Undisclosed (Note: Fee reported as €4.5 million)	
12 August 2020	DF	(Italy) Giulio Donati	Lecce	Free transfer	N/A	
22 August 2020	MF	(Italy) Andrea Colpani	Atalanta	Two-year loan	N/A	
25 August 2020	MF	(Italy) Antonino Barillà	Parma	Free transfer	N/A	
27 August 2020	GK	(Italy) Michele Di Gregorio	Inter Milan	Loan	N/A	
28 August 2020	DF	(Brazil) Carlos Augusto	(Brazil) Corinthians	Permanent	Undisclosed (Note: Fee reported as €4 million)	
11 September 2020	DF	(Italy) Davide Bettella	Atalanta	Two-year loan	N/A	
16 September 2020	MF	(Italy) Davide Frattesi	Sassuolo	Loan	N/A	
28 September 2020	MF	(Ghana) Kevin-Prince Boateng	Fiorentina	Permanent	Undisclosed	
1 October 2020	FW	(Croatia) Antonio Marin	(Croatia) Dinamo Zagreb	Loan	N/A	
5 October 2020	DF	(Italy) Lorenzo Pirola	Inter Milan	Loan	N/A	
Other transfers (Note: Players part of the previous season's first-team squad, or who were not included in this season's first-team squad.)
Date	Pos.	Name	From	Type	Fee	Ref.
1 July 2020	FW	(Italy) Ettore Gliozzi	Sassuolo	Loan made permanent	Undisclosed	
1 July 2020	MF	(Equatorial Guinea) José Machín	Parma	Loan made permanent	Undisclosed (Note: Fee reported as €4 million)	
1 July 2020	MF	(Italy) Tommaso Morosini	Südtirol	Loan made permanent	Undisclosed (Note: Fee reported as €0.5 million)	
1 July 2020	MF	(Italy) Nicola Mosti	Juventus	Loan made permanent	Undisclosed	
1 July 2020	FW	(Portugal) Dany Mota	Juventus	Loan made permanent	Undisclosed (Note: Fee reported as €2.3 million)	
1 July 2020	MF	(Italy) Andrea Palazzi	Inter Milan	Loan made permanent	Undisclosed (Note: Fee reported as €2 million)	
1 July 2020	MF	(Italy) Gianluca Barba	Pontedera	End of loan	N/A	
1 July 2020	MF	(Italy) Alessandro Di Munno	Vis Pesaro	End of loan	N/A	
1 July 2020	FW	(Italy) Luca Giudici	Lecco	End of loan	N/A	
1 July 2020	MF	(Italy) Filippo Lora	Ravenna	End of loan	N/A	
1 July 2020	MF	(Italy) Federico Marchesi	Lecco	End of loan	N/A	
1 July 2020	FW	(Italy) Ettore Marchi	Juventus U23	End of loan	N/A	
1 July 2020	DF	(Italy) Stefano Negro	Viterbese	End of loan	N/A	
1 July 2020	FW	(Cameroon) Hervé Otélé	Milano City	End of loan	N/A	
1 July 2020	MF	(Italy) Luca Palesi	Pro Patria	End of loan	N/A	
1 July 2020	FW	(Italy) Giacomo Tomaselli	Gozzano	End of loan	N/A	

==== Out ====
Departures
Date	Pos.	Name	To	Type	Fee	Ref.
1 July 2020	MF	(Italy) Giorgio Galli	Released (Note: Joined Lecco on 25 August 2020)		N/A	
1 July 2020	FW	(Italy) Ettore Marchi	Released (Note: Joined Vis Pesaro on 12 August 2020)		N/A	
1 July 2020	MF	(Italy) Nicola Rauti	Torino	End of loan	N/A	
20 August 2020	DF	(Italy) Ivan Marconi	Palermo	Permanent	Undisclosed	
2 September 2020	FW	(Italy) Andrea Brighenti	Juventus (Note: To play for Juventus U23)	Permanent	Undisclosed	
2 September 2020	DF	(Italy) Michele Franco	Pro Sesto	Permanent	Undisclosed	
5 September 2020	MF	(Italy) Andrea Palazzi	Palermo	Loan	N/A	
16 September 2020	DF	(Italy) Stefano Negro	Perugia	Loan	N/A	
17 September 2020	MF	(Italy) Alessandro Di Munno	Pro Sesto	Loan	N/A	
21 September 2020	MF	(Italy) Tommaso Morosini	Feralpisalò	Loan	N/A	
21 September 2020	GK	(Italy) Federico Del Frate	Pro Sesto	Loan	N/A	
23 September 2020	MF	(Italy) Cosimo Chiricò	Ascoli	Permanent	Undisclosed	
23 September 2020	MF	(Italy) Simone Iocolano	Lecco	Permanent	Undisclosed	
24 September 2020	FW	(Italy) Ettore Gliozzi	Cosenza	Loan	N/A	
1 October 2020	MF	(Italy) Nicola Mosti	Juventus	Loan	N/A	
6 October 2020	DF	(Italy) Armando Anastasio	(Croatia) Rijeka	Loan	N/A	
Other transfers (Note: Players not part of the previous season's first-team squad, or who were included in this season's first-team squad.)
Date	Pos.	Name	To	Type	Fee	Ref.
1 July 2020	MF	(Italy) Gianluca Barba	Released (Note: Joined Pontedera on 1 September 2020)		N/A	
1 July 2020	FW	(Italy) Luca Giudici	Released (Note: Joined Lecco on 6 July 2020)		N/A	
1 July 2020	FW	(Cameroon) Hervé Otélé	Released (Note: Joined Città di Varese on 8 August 2020)		N/A	
1 July 2020	MF	(Italy) Luca Palesi	Released (Note: Joined Pro Sesto on 13 August 2020)		N/A	
1 July 2020	FW	(Italy) Giacomo Tomaselli	Released (Note: Joined AlbinoLeffe on 11 August 2020)		N/A	
21 September 2020	MF	(Italy) Federico Marchesi	Pro Sesto	Permanent	Undisclosed	
30 September 2020	MF	(Italy) Filippo Lora	Lecco	Permanent	Undisclosed	
5 October 2020	DF	(Italy) Maicol Origlio	Released		N/A	

=== Winter ===
==== In ====
Arrivals
Date	Pos.	Name	From	Type	Fee	Ref.
7 December 2020	FW	(Italy) Mario Balotelli	Free agent	Free transfer	N/A	
5 January 2021	MF	(Italy) Matteo Scozzarella	Parma	Permanent	Undisclosed	
12 January 2021	FW	(Italy) Federico Ricci	Sassuolo	Six-month loan	N/A	
27 January 2021	FW	(Italy) Marco D'Alessandro	SPAL	Permanent	Undisclosed	
29 January 2021	FW	(Italy) Davide Diaw	Pordenone	Permanent	Undisclosed	
Other transfers
Date	Pos.	Name	From	Type	Fee	Ref.
18 January 2021	DF	(Italy) Armando Anastasio	(Croatia) Rijeka	End of loan	N/A	
1 February 2021	MF	(Italy) Nicola Mosti	Juventus U23	End of loan	N/A	

==== Out ====
Departures
Date	Pos.	Name	To	Type	Fee	Ref.
15 January 2021	MF	(Equatorial Guinea) José Machín	Pescara	Six-month loan	N/A	
27 January 2021	MF	(Italy) Nicola Rigoni	Pescara	Six-month loan	N/A	
28 January 2021	MF	(Italy) Luca Lombardi	Teramo	Six-month loan	N/A	
1 February 2021	DF	(Italy) Franco Lepore	Triestina	Permanent	Undisclosed	
1 February 2021	FW	(Italy) Mattia Finotto	Pordenone	Six-month loan	N/A	
Other transfers
Date	Pos.	Name	To	Type	Fee	Ref.
25 January 2021	FW	(Croatia) Antonio Marin	(Croatia) Dinamo Zagreb	Loan recalled	N/A	
1 February 2021	MF	(Italy) Nicola Mosti	Ascoli	Six-month loan	N/A	
1 February 2021	GK	(Italy) Federico Del Frate	Pro Sesto	Permanent	Undisclosed	
11 February 2021	MF	(Italy) Marco Fossati	(Croatia) Hajduk Split	Six-month loan	N/A	
