= 2021–22 AC Monza season =

Monza
2021–22 season
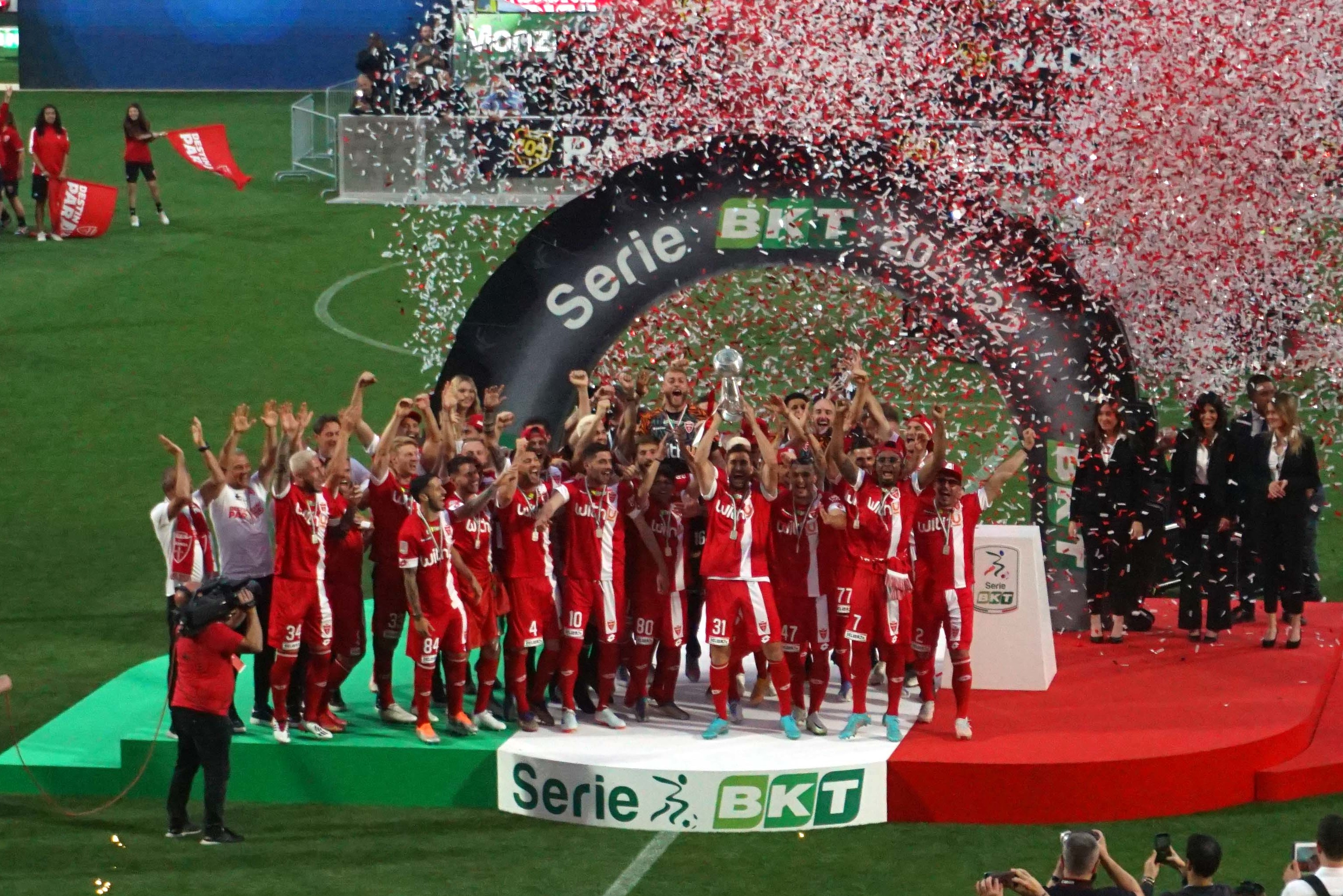
- Monza players celebrating their Serie B promotion play-off win
- President: Paolo Berlusconi
- Head coach: Giovanni Stroppa
- Stadium: Stadio Brianteo
- Serie B: 4th (promoted via play-offs)
- Coppa Italia: Round of 64
- Top goalscorer: League: Dany Mota (11); All: Christian Gytkjær (14)
- Highest home attendance: 9,649 (vs. Pisa, 26 May)
- Lowest home attendance: 2,001 (vs. Pordenone, 25 September)
- Average home league attendance: 4,496
- Biggest win: Monza 4–0 SPAL (12 February 2022); Monza 4–0 Vicenza (12 March 2022)
- Biggest defeat: Lecce 3–0 Monza (1 October 2021); Frosinone 4–1 Monza (25 April 2022)
Home colours	Away colours

The 2021–22 season was AC Monza's 40th season—and second consecutive season—in Serie B, the second tier of Italian football. The season began on 14 August 2021 and ended on 29 May 2022, under head coach Giovanni Stroppa. Monza finished fourth in the Serie B regular season with a record of 19 wins, 10 draws, and 9 defeats (67 points), qualifying directly for the promotion play-off semi-finals. After defeating Brescia in the semi-finals and Pisa after extra time in the final, Monza were promoted to Serie A for the first time in their history. In the Coppa Italia, they were eliminated in the round of 64 by Cittadella.

Monza brought in 11 first-team players during the summer transfer window—including Mattia Valoti, Patrick Ciurria, and Luca Caldirola—and added three more in the winter. Thirty-two different players represented the club across the regular season, play-offs, and Coppa Italia, with 15 different goalscorers. Dany Mota was Monza's top scorer in the Serie B regular season with 11 goals, while Christian Gytkjær led the club in all competitions with 14 goals, including five in the play-offs. Goalkeeper Michele Di Gregorio made the most appearances during the season with 42 across all competitions.

== Background ==
Following their 2020–21 campaign in Serie B—the second tier of Italian football—in which Monza finished third and lost to Cittadella in the promotion play-off semi-finals, the club appointed Giovanni Stroppa as head coach on 28 May 2021 to replace Cristian Brocchi. Monza remained owned by Silvio Berlusconi's holding company Fininvest, with his brother Paolo Berlusconi serving as president and Adriano Galliani as chief executive officer. The club played its home matches at the Stadio Brianteo, commercially known as the U-Power Stadium.

== Pre-season friendlies ==
On 15 July 2021, Monza played their first pre-season friendly against Real Vicenza in Ronzone, winning 14–0 with five goals from Mirko Marić, a hat-trick from Andrea Colpani, braces from Christian Gytkjær and José Machín, and single goals from Marco Armellino and Marco D'Alessandro. Five days later, they defeated Eccellenza side Anaune Val di Non 5–0 through a Marić hat-trick and goals by Carlos Augusto and Antonis Siatounis. Monza concluded their training camp in Ronzone on 24 July with a 3–0 win over Serie C club Pro Sesto, with Gytkjær scoring twice and Carlos Augusto adding a third.

On 31 July, Monza hosted Juventus in their first appearance in the Trofeo Luigi Berlusconi, an annual pre-season friendly match; D'Alessandro scored a late goal in a 2–1 defeat. Monza played their final two pre-season friendlies on 4 and 8 August, drawing 1–1 away to Pro Patria via a late Giulio Donati equalizer, and winning 3–0 at home against Giana Erminio through a goal by Marco Brescianini and a Marić brace. During the September international break, Monza also played a friendly against Sangiuliano City on 4 September, winning 1–0 with a goal from Machín.

Results list Monza's goal tally first.

Date	Opponent	Venue	Result	Scorers
15 July 2021	Real Vicenza	Neutral	14–0	Marić (5), Colpani (3), Gytkjær (2), Machín (2), Armellino, D'Alessandro
20 July 2021	Anaune Val di Non	Neutral	5–0	Carlos, Marić (3), Siatounis
24 July 2021	Pro Sesto	Neutral	3–0	Gytkjær (2) 23' (pen.), 43', Carlos 30'
31 July 2021	Juventus	Home	1–2	D'Alessandro 87'
4 August 2021	Pro Patria	Away	1–1	Donati 89'
8 August 2021	Giana Erminio	Home	3–0	Brescianini 60', Marić (2) 72', 80'
4 September 2021	Sangiuliano City	Home	1–0	Machín 12'

== Serie B ==
=== Overview ===
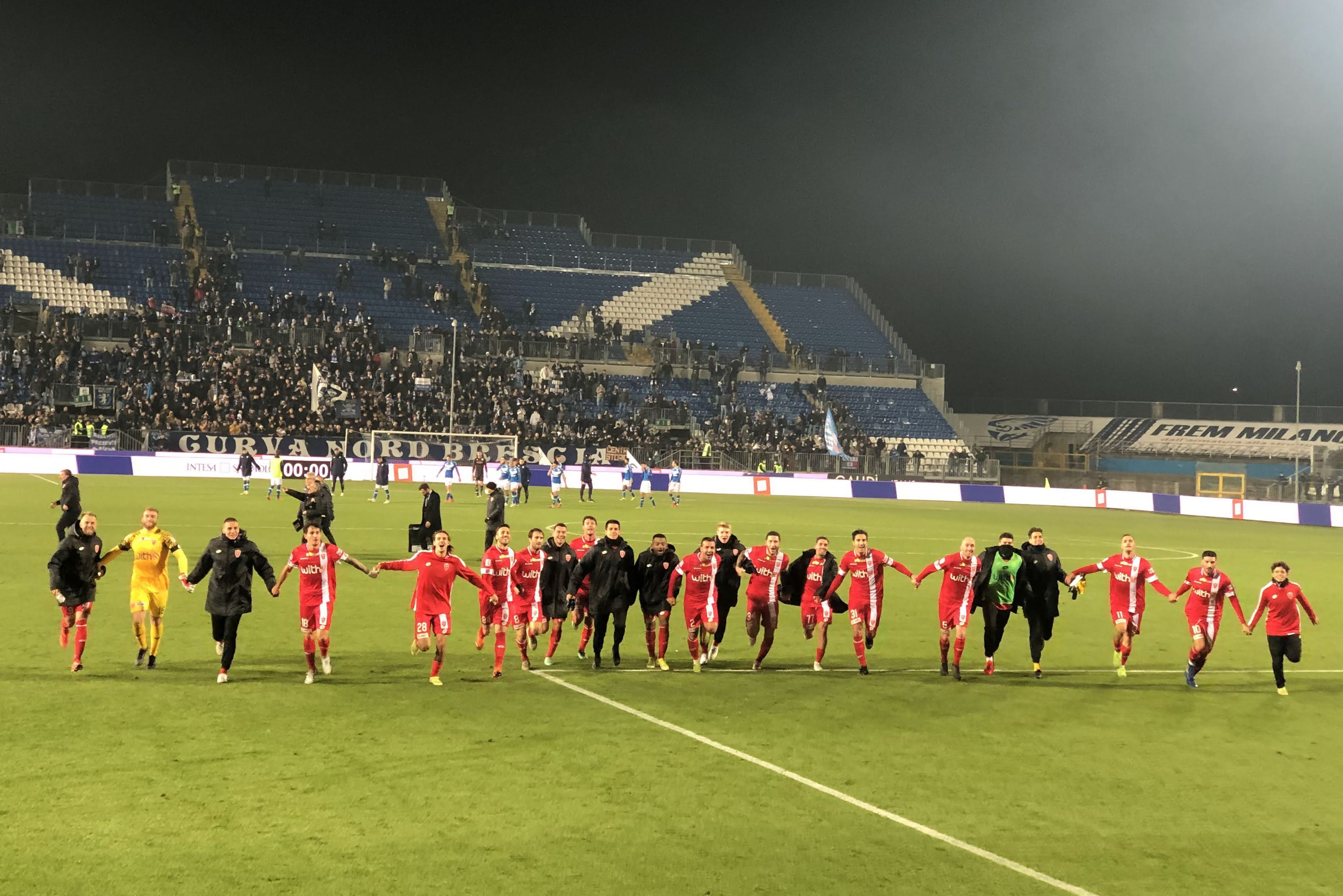
Monza players celebrating their 2–0 away win to Brescia in December 2021

Monza played their first league game on 22 August 2021, drawing 0–0 to Reggina away from home. Monza's first three points came on 29 August, in their first game at home, in a 1–0 win against Cremonese; Christian Gytkjær scored Monza's first league goal of the season, assisted by Pedro Pereira. In September, Monza opened with two 1–1 draws, to SPAL and Ternana respectively, before losing their first league game on 21 September, in a 2–1 defeat to Pisa. They ended the month in 11th place, with a 3–1 win over Pordenone from a comeback. On 1 October, Monza suffered a heavy defeat away to Lecce, with the 3–0 result moving Monza to 13th place.

Between 17 October and 11 December, Monza went through a 10-game unbeaten streak; they alternated away draws (to Parma, Vicenza, Crotone and Ascoli) to home wins (against Cittadella, Alessandria, Como and Cosenza), finishing with wins against Brescia and Frosinone in December. Key moments included Marco D'Alessandro's stoppage-time goal to help Monza beat Cittadella 1–0, José Machín's 30-meter goal in the 88th-minute which helped his side win 3–2 against Como, Dany Mota's consecutive braces at home against Como and Cosenza, and Monza's first away win of the season, a 2–0 victory over Brescia on 5 December. Thanks to their unbeaten streak, Monza climbed eight places and headed into 2022 in joint-third place.

Monza began the new year poorly, losing 3–1 away to Benevento; a 2–2 home draw to Perugia via a Patrick Ciurria stoppage-time penalty goal meant that Monza finished the first leg in sixth place. Their last game of the month was a 1–0 home win against Reggina. In February, after wins against SPAL and Ternana, Monza lost their first home game of the season after 11 matches, in a 2–1 defeat against Pisa. After a 4–1 away win to Pordenone thanks to a Mattia Valoti brace, Monza lost at home once again (1–0 to Lecce), closing February in sixth place. Monza went unbeaten in March, drawing once and winning four times; they climbed three positions, ending the month in third position. Most of their points came via last-minute goals, in the draw against Parma, and wins against Cittadella and Crotone.

After losing to rivals Como in April, Monza won against Ascoli and Cosenza 2–0, with Valoti and Gytkjær scoring a goal each in both games. With the two wins, Monza climbed to second place for the first time in the season, in a spot for direct promotion. Despite losing crucial points to Brescia and Frosinone, other results went in Monza's favour, who only dropped one position. They defeated fourth-placed Benevento 3–0 at home via a Mota brace, and surpassed Cremonese in second place. Monza headed into the final matchday in May against Perugia needing a win for automatic Serie A promotion; Perugia won 1–0 and Monza finished the season in fourth place, qualifying to the promotion play-offs.

=== Matches ===
Results list Monza's goal tally first.

Date	Opponent	Venue	Result	Scorers	Attendance	Position
22 August 2021	Reggina	Away	0–0		5,825	12th
29 August 2021	Cremonese	Home	1–0	Gytkjær 65'	2,501	8th
11 September 2021	SPAL	Away	1–1	Carlos 54'	3,725	9th
18 September 2021	Ternana	Home	1–1	Mota 5'	2,332	10th
21 September 2021	Pisa	Away	1–2	Mota 64'	4,635	14th
25 September 2021	Pordenone	Home	3–1	Machín 13', Sampirisi 72', Vignato 90'	2,001	11th
1 October 2021	Lecce	Away	0–3		8,442	13th
17 October 2021	Parma	Away	0–0		7,555	13th
23 October 2021	Cittadella	Home	1–0	D'Alessandro 90+1'	2,521	11th
27 October 2021	Vicenza	Away	1–1	Mazzitelli 34'	4,312	10th
1 November 2021	Alessandria	Home	1–0	Colpani 6'	3,145	9th
7 November 2021	Crotone	Away	1–1	Colpani 17'	2,226	11th
21 November 2021	Como	Home	3–2	Mota (2) 16', 29', Machín 88'	5,625	8th
27 November 2021	Ascoli	Away	1–1	Valoti 33'	3,942	8th
30 November 2021	Cosenza	Home	4–1	Colpani 11', Mota (2) 13', 22', Gytkjær 90+4'	3,450	5th
5 December 2021	Brescia	Away	2–0	Gytkjær 40', Machín 55'	5,080	5th
11 December 2021	Frosinone	Home	3–2	Carlos 70', Ciurria 87', Mazzitelli 90+2' (pen.)	2,660	5th
13 January 2022	Benevento	Away	1–3	Valoti 47' (pen.)	5,502	6th
16 January 2022	Perugia	Home	2–2	Valoti 45' (pen.), Ciurria 90+5'	2,493	6th
22 January 2022	Reggina	Home	1–0	Mota 52'	3,387	6th
6 February 2022	Cremonese	Away	2–3	D'Alessandro 54', Ciurria 84'	4,062	7th
12 February 2022	SPAL	Home	4–0	Mota 45', Sampirisi 52', Ramírez 77', Colpani 89'	3,212	5th
15 February 2022	Ternana	Away	1–0	Valoti 38' (pen.)	1,713	5th
19 February 2022	Pisa	Home	1–2	Valoti 8'	4,572	5th
22 February 2022	Pordenone	Away	4–1	Valoti (2) 19', 64', Colpani 24', Gytkjær 67'	618	5th
27 February 2022	Lecce	Home	0–1		6,858	6th
2 March 2022	Parma	Home	1–1	Gytkjær 87'	3,789	6th
5 March 2022	Cittadella	Away	2–1	Valoti 13', Ciurria 90+3'	1,657	5th
12 March 2022	Vicenza	Home	4–0	Sampirisi 9', Barberis 84', Pasini 90' (o.g.), Mancuso 90+1'	3,524	5th
15 March 2022	Alessandria	Away	3–0	Di Gennaro 41' (o.g.), Ciurria 62', Gytkjær 90'	2,050	4th
19 March 2022	Crotone	Home	1–0	Barberis 90+5'	3,601	3rd
3 April 2022	Como	Away	0–2		4,904	4th
6 April 2022	Ascoli	Home	2–0	Valoti 16', Gytkjær 28' (pen.)	4,633	3rd
10 April 2022	Cosenza	Away	2–0	Valoti 16' (pen.), Gytkjær 64' (pen.)	2,592	2nd
18 April 2022	Brescia	Home	1–1	Machín 49'	7,504	3rd
25 April 2022	Frosinone	Away	1–4	Mota 13'	6,631	3rd
30 April 2022	Benevento	Home	3–0	Mota (2) 48', 88', Gytkjær 53' (pen.)	8,402	2nd
6 May 2022	Perugia	Away	0–1		6,828	4th

=== League table ===
Pos	Team	Pld	W	D	L	GF	GA	GD	Pts	Promotion, qualification or relegation
2	Cremonese (P)	38	20	9	9	57	39	+18	69	Promotion to Serie A
3	Pisa	38	18	13	7	48	35	+13	67 (Note: Pisa finished ahead of Monza on head-to-head points: Pisa 2–1 Monza, Monza 1–2 Pisa.)	Promotion play-offs semi-finals
4	Monza (O, P)	38	19	10	9	60	38	+22	67	Promotion play-offs semi-finals
5	Brescia	38	17	15	6	55	35	+20	66	Promotion play-offs preliminary round
6	Ascoli	38	19	8	11	52	42	+10	65	Promotion play-offs preliminary round

Source: Lega Serie B (in Italian), Soccerway (in English)
Rules for classification: 1) Points; 2) Head-to-head points; 3) Head-to-head goal difference; 4) Goal difference; 5) Goals scored; 6) Draw.
(O) Play-off winners; (P) Promoted

== Serie B promotion play-offs ==
=== Overview ===
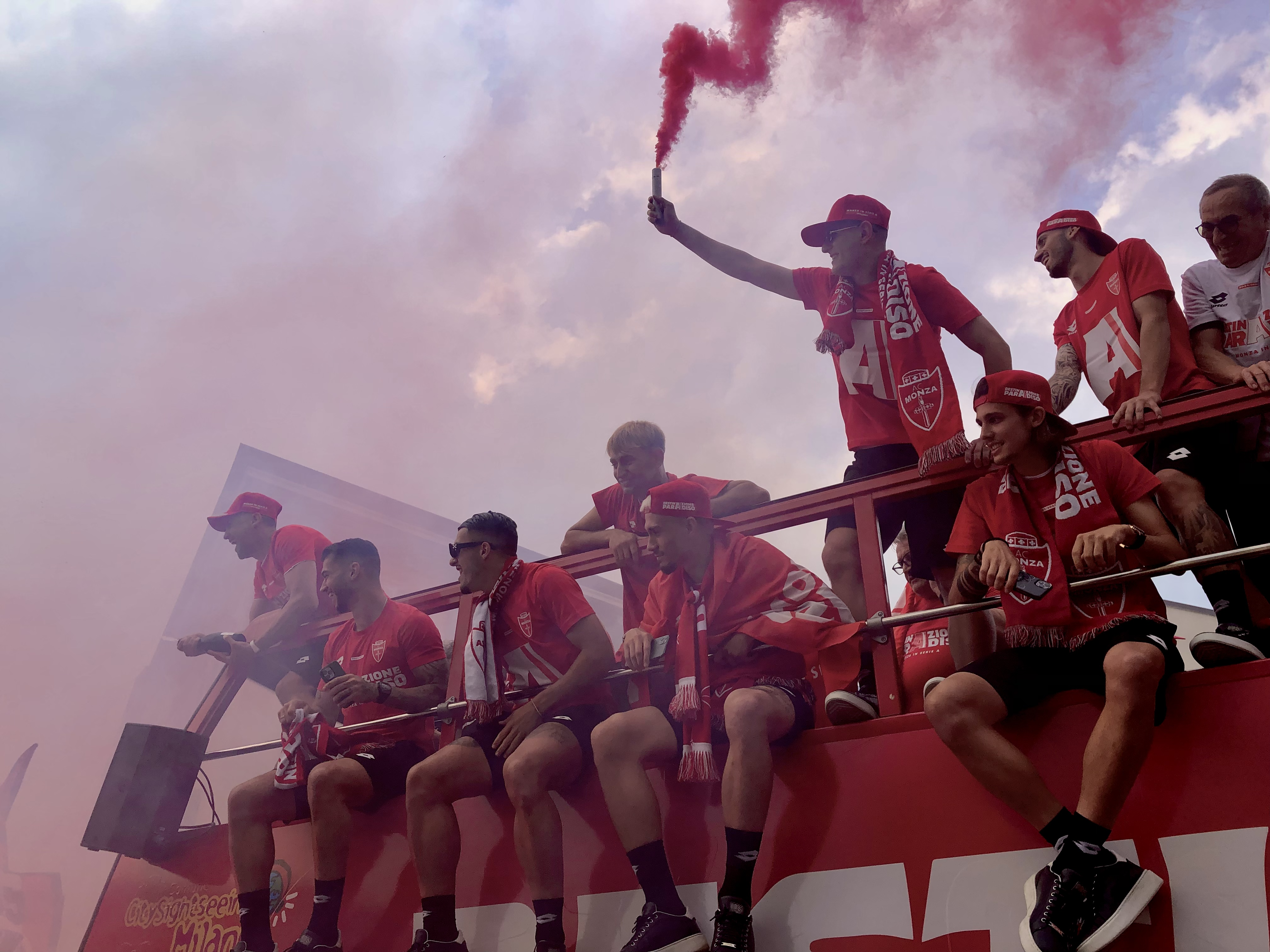
Monza players celebrating on an open top bus their first Serie A promotion in 2022

Having finished the regular season in fourth place, Monza gained direct access to the semi-finals of the promotion play-offs. They played against Brescia, winning both legs 2–1. On 26 May 2022, Monza played the first leg of the play-off final against Pisa; after leading 2–0, Monza conceded in stoppage time, with the match finishing 2–1.

Three days later, on 29 May, the two sides played the second leg in Pisa. After only nine minutes, the home side were leading 2–0. Machín's 20th-minute goal shortened the distance. In the second half, Gytkjær's 79th-minute equalizer meant that Monza were only 11 minutes from Serie A promotion. However, a last-minute goal by Pisa's Giuseppe Mastinu forced the game into extra time. Goals by Luca Marrone and Gytkjær gave Monza the win, and their first promotion to Serie A. Gytkjær finished the play-offs with five goals in four games, and was nominated MVP of the play-offs. Before earning promotion, Monza held the record for the most Serie B seasons played without reaching Serie A, with 40.

=== Matches ===
Results list Monza's goal tally first.

Date	Round	Opponent	Venue	Result	Scorers	Attendance
18 May 2022	Semi-final	Brescia	Away	2–1	Gytkjær (2) 44', 56' (pen.)	13,600
22 May 2022	Semi-final	Brescia	Home	2–1	Mancuso 70', D'Alessandro 90+4'	8,559
26 May 2022	Final	Pisa	Home	2–1	Mota 9', Gytkjær 74'	9,649
29 May 2022	Final	Pisa	Away	4–3 (a.e.t.)	Gytkjær (2) 79', 101', Machín 20', Marrone 96'	9,942

=== Bracket ===
Preliminary round
5	Brescia (a.e.t.)	3
8	Perugia	2
6	Ascoli	0
7	Benevento	1

Semi-finals
5	Brescia	1	1	2
4	Monza	2	2	4
7	Benevento	1	0	1
3	Pisa	0	1	1

Final
4	Monza (a.e.t.)	2	4	6
3	Pisa	1	3	4

== Coppa Italia ==
Monza faced Cittadella away in the round of 64 on 14 August 2021. Cittadella took an early lead in the eighth minute through Orji Okwonkwo, with Carlos Augusto equalizing for Monza 17 minutes later; five minutes before the end of the first half, Cittadella regained the lead with a Mamadou Tounkara goal. The match ended 2–1, and Monza were eliminated from the cup.

Results list Monza's goal tally first.

Date	Round	Opponent	Venue	Result	Scorers	Attendance
14 August 2021	Round of 64	Cittadella	Away	1–2	Carlos 26'	0

== Player details ==
As of match played 29 May 2022

No.	Pos	Nat	Player	Total		Serie B		Serie B play-offs		Coppa Italia	
No.	Pos	Nat	Player	Apps	Goals	Apps	Goals	Apps	Goals	Apps	Goals
1	GK	(Italy) ITA	Eugenio Lamanna	1	0	1	0	0	0	0	0
2	DF	(Italy) ITA	Giulio Donati	31	0	25+4	0	1	0	0+1	0
4	MF	(Italy) ITA	Luca Mazzitelli	31	2	21+7	2	3	0	0	0
5	DF	(Italy) ITA	Luca Caldirola	28	0	21+3	0	3	0	1	0
6	DF	(Italy) ITA	Giuseppe Bellusci	2	0	0+1	0	0	0	1	0
7	MF	(Equatorial Guinea) GEQ	José Machín	30	5	16+9	4	3+1	1	1	0
8	MF	(Italy) ITA	Andrea Barberis	40	2	30+6	2	4	0	0	0
9	FW	(Denmark) DEN	Christian Gytkjær	38	14	15+18	9	2+2	5	1	0
10	MF	(Italy) ITA	Mattia Valoti	31	10	23+8	10	0	0	0	0
11	FW	(Italy) ITA	Mattia Finotto	2	0	0+2	0	0	0	0	0
11	FW	(Italy) ITA	Leonardo Mancuso	20	2	8+8	1	0+4	1	0	0
12	GK	(Italy) ITA	Daniele Sommariva	0	0	0	0	0	0	0	0
13	DF	(Portugal) POR	Pedro Pereira	35	0	24+9	0	0+1	0	1	0
16	GK	(Italy) ITA	Michele Di Gregorio	42	0	37	0	4	0	1	0
17	MF	(Italy) ITA	Antonino Barillà	4	0	0+3	0	0	0	1	0
18	DF	(Italy) ITA	Davide Bettella	9	0	2+5	0	0+2	0	0	0
19	FW	(Italy) ITA	Andrea Favilli	10	0	1+9	0	0	0	0	0
20	MF	(Greece) GRE	Antonis Siatounis	2	0	0+2	0	0	0	0	0
21	MF	(Uruguay) URU	Gastón Ramírez	6	1	1+5	1	0	0	0	0
22	GK	(Italy) ITA	Stefano Rubbi	0	0	0	0	0	0	0	0
23	MF	(Italy) ITA	Matteo Scozzarella	4	0	3	0	0	0	1	0
26	DF	(Bulgaria) BUL	Valentin Antov	7	0	3+3	0	0+1	0	0	0
28	MF	(Italy) ITA	Andrea Colpani	37	5	21+12	5	0+3	0	0+1	0
29	DF	(Italy) ITA	Gabriel Paletta	21	0	14+4	0	1+1	0	0+1	0
30	DF	(Brazil) BRA	Carlos Augusto	37	3	31+1	2	4	0	1	1
31	DF	(Italy) ITA	Mario Sampirisi	30	3	17+10	3	1+1	0	1	0
33	MF	(Italy) ITA	Marco Brescianini	6	0	2+3	0	0	0	1	0
34	DF	(Italy) ITA	Luca Marrone	22	1	17+1	0	3+1	1	0	0
47	FW	(Portugal) POR	Dany Mota	32	12	24+4	11	4	1	0	0
62	GK	(Italy) ITA	Andrea Mazza	0	0	0	0	0	0	0	0
66	GK	(Italy) ITA	Gianluca Ravarelli	0	0	0	0	0	0	0	0
77	MF	(Italy) ITA	Marco D'Alessandro	36	3	20+11	2	1+3	1	0+1	0
79	MF	(Italy) ITA	Salvatore Molina	21	0	15+2	0	3+1	0	0	0
80	FW	(Italy) ITA	Samuele Vignato	13	1	5+8	1	0	0	0	0
84	FW	(Italy) ITA	Patrick Ciurria	39	5	17+17	5	4	0	0+1	0
98	DF	(Italy) ITA	Lorenzo Pirola	14	0	4+6	0	4	0	0	0

== Transfers ==
=== Summer ===
Arrivals
Date	Pos.	Name	From	Type	Fee	Ref.
1 July 2021	MF	(Italy) Marco Brescianini	AC Milan	Loan	N/A	
1 July 2021	MF	(Greece) Antonis Siatounis	Sampdoria	Free transfer	N/A	
9 July 2021	MF	(Italy) Luca Mazzitelli	Sassuolo	Permanent	Undisclosed (Note: Fee reported as €2 million)	
12 July 2021	MF	(Italy) Mattia Valoti	SPAL	Loan	N/A	
17 July 2021	DF	(Italy) Luca Caldirola	Benevento	Permanent	Undisclosed (Note: Fee reported as €800,000)	
23 July 2021	DF	(Portugal) Pedro Pereira	(Portugal) Benfica	Loan	N/A	
31 July 2021	FW	(Italy) Patrick Ciurria	Pordenone	Permanent	Undisclosed (Note: Fee reported as €1.5 million)	
11 August 2021	MF	(Italy) Samuele Vignato	ChievoVerona	Free transfer	N/A	
27 August 2021	DF	(Bulgaria) Valentin Antov	(Bulgaria) CSKA Sofia	Loan	N/A	
31 August 2021	FW	(Italy) Andrea Favilli	Genoa	Loan	N/A	
31 August 2021	DF	(Italy) Luca Marrone	Crotone	Permanent	Undisclosed	
Other transfers (Note: Players part of the previous season's first-team squad, or who were not included in this season's first-team squad.)
Date	Pos.	Name	From	Type	Fee	Ref.
1 July 2021	GK	(Italy) Michele Di Gregorio	Inter Milan	Loan	N/A	
1 July 2021	DF	(Italy) Stefano Negro	Perugia	End of loan	N/A	
1 July 2021	MF	(Italy) Alessandro Di Munno	Pro Sesto	End of loan	N/A	
1 July 2021	MF	(Italy) Marco Fossati	(Croatia) Hajduk Split	End of loan	N/A	
1 July 2021	MF	(Italy) Luca Lombardi	Teramo	End of loan	N/A	
1 July 2021	MF	(Equatorial Guinea) José Machín	Pescara	End of loan	N/A	
1 July 2021	MF	(Italy) Tommaso Morosini	Feralpisalò	End of loan	N/A	
1 July 2021	MF	(Italy) Nicola Mosti	Ascoli	End of loan	N/A	
1 July 2021	MF	(Italy) Andrea Palazzi	Palermo	End of loan	N/A	
1 July 2021	MF	(Italy) Nicola Rigoni	Pescara	End of loan	N/A	
1 July 2021	FW	(Italy) Mattia Finotto	Pordenone	End of loan	N/A	
1 July 2021	FW	(Italy) Ettore Gliozzi	Cosenza	End of loan	N/A	
14 July 2021	DF	(Italy) Lorenzo Pirola	Inter Milan	Loan	N/A	

Departures
Date	Pos.	Name	To	Type	Fee	Ref.
1 July 2021	MF	(Ghana) Kevin-Prince Boateng	Released (Note: Joined Hertha BSC on 1 July 2021)		N/A	
1 July 2021	FW	(Italy) Mario Balotelli	Released (Note: Joined Adana Demirspor on 7 July 2021)		N/A	
1 July 2021	MF	(Italy) Davide Frattesi	Sassuolo	End of loan	N/A	
1 July 2021	FW	(Italy) Federico Ricci	Sassuolo	End of loan	N/A	
7 July 2021	MF	(Italy) Andrea D'Errico	Released (Note: Joined Bari on 8 July 2021)		N/A	
8 July 2021	FW	(Italy) Davide Diaw	Vicenza	Loan	N/A	
8 July 2021	FW	(Italy) Edoardo Colferai	Villa Valle	Permanent	Undisclosed	
13 July 2021	DF	(Italy) Filippo Scaglia	Como	Permanent	Undisclosed	
17 August 2021	FW	(Croatia) Mirko Marić	Crotone	Loan	N/A	
24 August 2021	MF	(Italy) Marco Armellino	Modena	Permanent	Undisclosed	
27 August 2021	MF	(Italy) Nicola Rigoni	Cesena	Loan	N/A	
31 August 2021	MF	(Italy) Marco Fossati	(Croatia) Hajduk Split	Permanent	Undisclosed	
31 August 2021	DF	(Italy) Armando Anastasio	Reggiana	Loan	N/A	
Other transfers (Note: Players not part of the previous season's first-team squad, or who were included in this season's first-team squad.)
Date	Pos.	Name	To	Type	Fee	Ref.
1 July 2021	GK	(Italy) Michele Di Gregorio	Inter Milan	End of loan	N/A	
1 July 2021	DF	(Italy) Lorenzo Pirola	Inter Milan	End of loan	N/A	
16 July 2021	MF	(Italy) Nicola Mosti	Modena	Loan	N/A	
20 July 2021	MF	(Italy) Luca Lombardi	Vis Pesaro	Loan	N/A	
10 August 2021	FW	(Italy) Ettore Gliozzi	Como	Permanent	Undisclosed	
26 August 2021	MF	(Italy) Alessandro Di Munno	Lecco	Permanent	Undisclosed	
26 August 2021	MF	(Italy) Tommaso Morosini	Lecco	Loan	N/A	
31 August 2021	MF	(Italy) Andrea Palazzi	Alessandria	Permanent	Undisclosed	
31 August 2021	DF	(Italy) Stefano Negro	Triestina	Permanent	Undisclosed	

=== Winter ===
Arrivals
Date	Pos.	Name	From	Type	Fee	Ref.
7 December 2021	MF	(Uruguay) Gastón Ramírez	Free agent	Free transfer	N/A	
5 January 2022	MF	(Italy) Salvatore Molina	Crotone	Permanent	Undisclosed	
20 January 2022	FW	(Italy) Leonardo Mancuso	Empoli	Two-year loan	N/A	
Other transfers
Date	Pos.	Name	From	Type	Fee	Ref.
26 January 2022	DF	(Italy) Armando Anastasio	Reggiana	End of loan	N/A	

Departures
Date	Pos.	Name	To	Type	Fee	Ref.
4 January 2022	DF	(Italy) Giuseppe Bellusci	Ascoli	Loan	N/A	
12 January 2022	FW	(Italy) Mattia Finotto	SPAL	Permanent	Undisclosed	
25 January 2022	MF	(Italy) Antonino Barillà	Released (Note: Joined Alessandria on 25 February 2022)		N/A	
Other transfers
Date	Pos.	Name	To	Type	Fee	Ref.
26 January 2022	DF	(Italy) Armando Anastasio	Pordenone	Six-month loan	N/A	
