= Bettella =

Bettella is a surname. Notable people with the surname include:

- Davide Bettella (born 2000), Italian footballer
- Francesco Bettella (born 1989), Italian Paralympic swimmer
