= Davide Frattesi =

Italian footballer (born 1999)

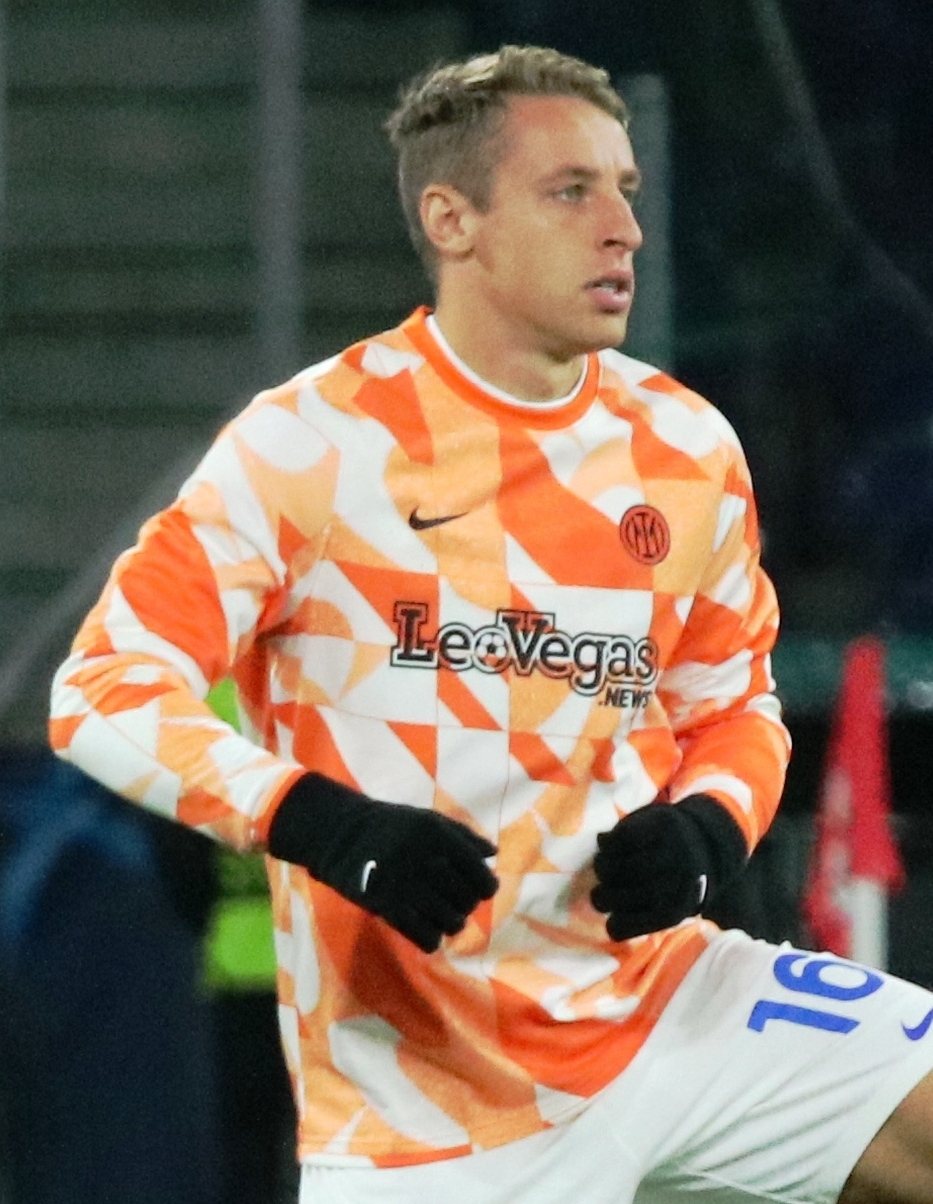
- Frattesi with Inter Milan in 2023

Personal information
- Full name: Davide Frattesi
- Date of birth: 22 September 1999 (age 27)
- Place of birth: Rome, Italy
- Height: 1.78 m (5 ft 10 in)
- Position: Central midfielder

Team information
- Current team: Lazio (on loan from Inter Milan)
- Number: 16

Youth career
- 2006–2014: Lazio
- 2014–2017: Roma

Senior career*
| Years | Team | Apps | (Gls) |
| 2017–2024 | Sassuolo | 72 | (11) |
| 2018–2019 | → Ascoli (loan) | 33 | (0) |
| 2019–2020 | → Empoli (loan) | 37 | (5) |
| 2020–2021 | → Monza (loan) | 37 | (8) |
| 2023–2024 | → Inter Milan (loan) | 32 | (6) |
| 2024– | Inter Milan | 50 | (5) |
| 2026– | → Lazio (loan) | 11 | (4) |

International career^{‡}
| 2015–2016 | Italy U17 | 10 | (2) |
| 2016–2017 | Italy U18 | 4 | (0) |
| 2016–2018 | Italy U19 | 20 | (1) |
| 2018–2019 | Italy U20 | 12 | (4) |
| 2019–2021 | Italy U21 | 10 | (2) |
| 2022– | Italy | 39 | (10) |
Medal record
Men's football
Representing Italy
UEFA Nations League
| Third place | 2023 Netherlands |
UEFA European Under-19 Championship
| Runner-up | 2018 Finland |
- * Club domestic league appearances and goals as of 22:58, 8 November 2026 (UTC) ‡ National team caps and goals as of 12 November 2026

Davide Frattesi (born 22 September 1999) is an Italian professional footballer who plays as a central midfielder for Serie A club Lazio, on loan from Inter Milan, and the Italy national team.

== Club career ==
=== Sassuolo ===
On 20 December 2017, Frattesi made his professional debut in a 2–1 away defeat against Serie A club Atalanta in the round of 16 of Coppa Italia, he was replaced by Matteo Politano in the 74th minute. He made several more bench appearances for Sassuolo's senior team during the season, but did not appear on the field.

==== Loan to Ascoli ====
On 16 August 2018, Frattesi joined to Serie B side Ascoli on loan until 30 June 2019. Ten days later, on 26 August, he made his Serie B debut for Ascoli as a substitute replacing Tomasz Kupisz in the 57th minute of a 1–1 home draw against Cosenza. One week later, on 2 September, Frattesi played his first match as a starter, a 2–0 away defeat against Perugia, he was replaced after 61 minutes by Enrico Baldini.

On 15 September he played his first entire match for Ascoli, a 1–0 home win over Lecce. Frattesi ended his season-long loan to Ascoli with 33 appearances, including 26 of them as a starter, and 2 assists.

==== Loan to Empoli ====
On 15 July 2019, Frattesi was signed by Serie B club Empoli on a season-long loan deal. On 11 August he made his debut for the club as a substitute replacing Filippo Bandinelli in the 46th minute of a 2–1 home win against Reggina in the second round of Coppa Italia. On 25 August he made his league debut for Empoli as a substitute replacing Karim Laribi in the 72nd minute of a 2–1 home win over Juve Stabia.

On 21 September, he played his first match as a starter for the club, a 1–0 home win over Cittadella and three days later his first entire match, a 3–2 away win over Pisa, where he also scored his first professional goal and the winning goal in the 95th minute. Frattesi ended his season-long loan to Empoli with 41 appearances, 5 goals and 4 assists.

==== Loan to Monza ====
On 16 September 2020, Frattesi joined newly-promoted Serie B side Monza on a one-year loan. On 25 September he made his league debut for the club as a substitute replacing Marco Armellino for the last 17 minutes of a 0–0 home draw against SPAL. On 20 October he played his first match as a starter for the club in Serie B, where he scored his first goal for Monza in the 46th minute of a 1–1 away draw against Pisa. Four days later, on 24 October, Frattesi played his first entire match, a 2–1 home defeat against Chievo.

On 1 May 2021, Frattesi scored his eighth goal for Monza against Salernitana; winning a personal bet he made with coach Cristian Brocchi. Frattesi was nominated in the Serie B Team of the Season, finishing the season with eight goals and two assists.

=== Inter Milan ===
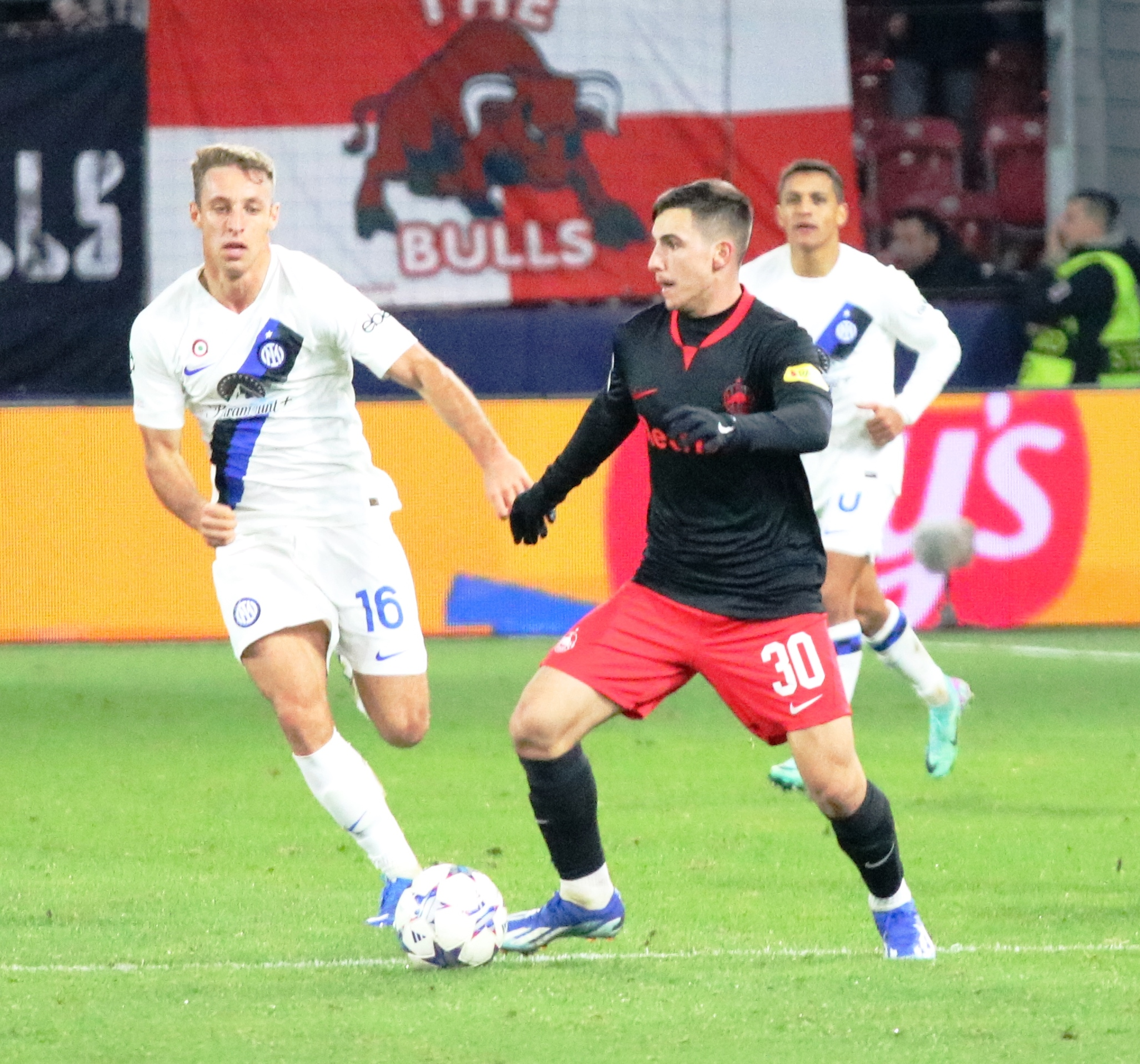
Frattesi (left) playing with Inter Milan in 2023

On 7 July 2023, Frattesi joined Inter Milan on a season-long loan with an obligation to buy. On 16 September 2023, Frattesi scored his debut goal for Inter Milan in a 5–1 win over AC Milan during the Derby della Madonnina at San Siro.

On 19 January 2024, Frattesi scored in a 3–0 win over Lazio in the 2023 Supercoppa Italiana semi-finals. Inter went on to win the title, defeating Napoli 1–0 in the final on 22 January, with Frattesi making a second-half substitute appearance. On 8 April, he scored a decisive stoppage-time goal to help Inter to a 2–1 win over Udinese in the league.

Inter finished the 2023–24 season as Serie A champions, after defeating cross-city rivals Milan 2–1 on 22 April; the match culminated in a brawl, during which Milan defender Davide Calabria was sent off for striking Frattesi. On 8 April 2025, Frattesi scored his first UEFA Champions League goal, securing a 2–1 away win against Bayern Munich in the first leg of the quarter finals of the competition. On 6 May 2025, Frattesi scored the decisive extra-time goal in a 4–3 victory over Barcelona in the second leg of the Champions League semi-finals, sending Inter to the final with a 7–6 aggregate win.

==== Loan to Lazio ====
On 14 August 2026, Frattesi joined fellow Serie A club Lazio on a season-long loan, with an option to make the transfer permanent. Later that month, on 24 August, he scored his first goal in a 1–0 away win over Bologna.

== International career ==
With the Italy U17 side, Frattesi took part in the 2016 UEFA European Under-17 Championship, where they were eliminated in the first round following a 4–2 defeat to eventual finalists Spain in the final group match.

With the Italy U19 he took part in the 2018 UEFA European Under-19 Championship, and scored one goal in the tournament, which came in a 3–2 win against Portugal in the first round; Italy reached the final, where they faced the same opponent, losing 4–3 after extra time.

The following year he took part in the 2019 FIFA U-20 World Cup with the Italy U20 squad. He scored in Italy's opening 2–1 win against Mexico, and in a 4–2 win over Mali in the quarter-finals; the team were eliminated in the semi-finals by Ukraine following a 1–0 defeat, eventually finishing the tournament in fourth place after losing out 1–0 to Ecuador in the bronze medal match.

He made his debut with the Italy U21 squad on 6 September 2019, scoring two goals as a substitute in a 4–0 friendly win 4–0 against Moldova in Catania. He was included in the squad for the 2021 UEFA European Under-21 Championship, where the team reached the quarter-finals, losing out to eventual runners-up Portugal 5–3 in extra time.

Frattesi was included by manager Roberto Mancini in the Italy senior squad for the 2022 Finalissima against Argentina on 1 June 2022 and for 2022–23 UEFA Nations League group stage matches against Germany, Hungary, England and Germany between 4 and 14 June 2022. He made his senior debut in the former Nations League match, which ended in a 1–1 home draw.

On 18 June 2023, Frattesi scored his first senior international goal in Italy's 3–2 victory in the third-place 2023 UEFA Nations League Finals match against the Netherlands.

On 13 September, he scored both goals in a 2–1 home win over Ukraine, which saw Italy qualify for Euro 2024.

In June 2024, Frattesi was included by manager Luciano Spalletti in Italy's squad for UEFA Euro 2024. On 9 June, he scored the only goal in a friendly win against Bosnia and Herzegovina at the Stadio Carlo Castellani, Italy's final warm-up match prior to the tournament, coming off for debutant Michael Folorunsho in the second half.

== Style of play ==
Frattesi is noted for his stamina, tactical awareness, and ability to contribute in both attacking and defensive phases of play. He frequently creates attacking plays and scores unassisted goals. Although he played as an attacking midfielder in his youth, he plays as a central midfielder in the mezzala role, and also plays as a defensive midfielder.

== Career statistics ==
=== Club ===
As of match played 8 November 2026

Appearances and goals by club, season and competition
| Club | Season | League | | | Coppa Italia | | Europe | | Other | | Total | |
| Club | Season | Division | Apps | Goals | Apps | Goals | Apps | Goals | Apps | Goals | Apps | Goals |
|---|---|---|---|---|---|---|---|---|---|---|---|---|
| Sassuolo | 2017–18 | Serie A | 0 | 0 | 1 | 0 | — | | — | | 1 | 0 |
| Sassuolo | 2021–22 | Serie A | 36 | 4 | 2 | 0 | — | | — | | 38 | 4 |
| Sassuolo | 2022–23 | Serie A | 36 | 7 | 1 | 0 | — | | — | | 37 | 7 |
| Sassuolo | Total | | 72 | 11 | 4 | 0 | — | | — | | 76 | 11 |
| Ascoli (loan) | 2018–19 | Serie B | 33 | 0 | 0 | 0 | — | | — | | 33 | 0 |
| Empoli (loan) | 2019–20 | Serie B | 37 | 5 | 3 | 0 | — | | 1 (Note: Appearance(s) in Serie B promotion play-offs) | 0 | 41 | 5 |
| Monza (loan) | 2020–21 | Serie B | 37 | 8 | 2 | 0 | — | | 2 | 0 | 41 | 8 |
| Inter Milan (loan) | 2023–24 | Serie A | 32 | 6 | 1 | 0 | 7 (Note: Appearances in UEFA Champions League) | 1 | 2 (Note: Appearance(s) in Supercoppa Italiana) | 1 | 42 | 8 |
| Inter Milan | 2024–25 | Serie A | 28 | 5 | 4 | 0 | 13 | 2 | 2 | 0 | 47 | 7 |
| Inter Milan | 2025–26 | Serie A | 22 | 0 | 3 | 0 | 7 | 0 | 1 | 0 | 33 | 0 |
| Inter Milan | Inter total | | 82 | 11 | 8 | 0 | 27 | 3 | 5 | 1 | 122 | 15 |
| Lazio (loan) | 2026–27 | Serie A | 11 | 4 | 1 | 0 | — | | 0 | 0 | 12 | 4 |
| Career total | | | 272 | 39 | 18 | 0 | 27 | 3 | 8 | 1 | 325 | 43 |

=== International ===
As of match played 12 November 2026

Appearances and goals by national team and year
| National team | Year | Apps | Goals |
|---|---|---|---|
| Italy | 2022 | 4 | 0 |
| Italy | 2023 | 7 | 4 |
| Italy | 2024 | 14 | 4 |
| Italy | 2025 | 8 | 0 |
| Italy | 2026 | 6 | 2 |
| Total | | 39 | 10 |

Italy score listed first, score column indicates score after each Frattesi goal.

List of international goals scored by Davide Frattesi
| No. | Date | Venue | Cap | Opponent | Score | Result | Competition |
|---|---|---|---|---|---|---|---|
| 1 | 18 June 2023 | De Grolsch Veste, Enschede, Netherlands | 6 | Netherlands | 2–0 | 3–2 | 2023 UEFA Nations League Finals |
| 2 | 12 September 2023 | San Siro, Milan, Italy | 7 | Ukraine | 1–0 | 2–1 | UEFA Euro 2024 qualifying |
| 3 | 12 September 2023 | San Siro, Milan, Italy | 7 | Ukraine | 2–0 | 2–1 | UEFA Euro 2024 qualifying |
| 4 | 14 October 2023 | Stadio San Nicola, Bari, Italy | 8 | Malta | 4–0 | 4–0 | UEFA Euro 2024 qualifying |
| 5 | 9 June 2024 | Stadio Carlo Castellani, Empoli, Italy | 15 | Bosnia and Herzegovina | 1–0 | 1–0 | Friendly |
| 6 | 6 September 2024 | Parc des Princes, Paris, France | 20 | France | 2–1 | 3–1 | 2024–25 UEFA Nations League A |
| 7 | 9 September 2024 | Bozsik Aréna, Budapest, Hungary | 21 | Israel | 1–0 | 2–1 | 2024–25 UEFA Nations League A |
| 8 | 14 October 2024 | Stadio Friuli, Udine, Italy | 23 | Israel | 3–1 | 4–1 | 2024–25 UEFA Nations League A |
| 9 | 28 September 2026 | Centennial Atatürk Stadium, Bursa, Turkey | 36 | Turkey | 2–0 | 4–1 | 2026–27 UEFA Nations League A |
| 10 | 12 November 2026 | San Siro, Milan, Italy | 39 | France | 2–1 | 3–1 | 2026–27 UEFA Nations League A |

== Honours ==
Roma Primavera

- Campionato Nazionale Primavera: 2016–17
- Supercoppa Primavera: 2017

Inter Milan

- Serie A: 2023–24, 2025–26
- Coppa Italia: 2025–26
- Supercoppa Italiana: 2023
- UEFA Champions League runner-up: 2024–25

Italy U19

- UEFA European Under-19 Championship runner-up: 2018

Individual

- Serie B Team of the Season: 2020–21
- Premio Bulgarelli Number 8: 2023
