= Nicola Mosti =

Italian footballer (born 1998)

Personal information
- Date of birth: 7 February 1998 (age 28)
- Place of birth: Pietrasanta, Italy
- Height: 1.77 m (5 ft 10 in)
- Position: Attacking midfielder

Team information
- Current team: Catanzaro
- Number: 98

Youth career
- –2016: Empoli
- 2016–2017: Juventus

Senior career*
Years	Team	Apps	(Gls)
2017–2020	Juventus	0	(0)
2017–2018	→ Gavorrano (loan)	15	(2)
2018	→ Viterbese (loan)	7	(0)
2018–2019	→ Imolese (loan)	36	(6)
2019–2020	→ Monza (loan)	18	(3)
2020–2022	Monza	0	(0)
2020–2021	→ Juventus U23 (loan)	12	(1)
2021	→ Ascoli (loan)	9	(1)
2021–2022	→ Modena (loan)	34	(4)
2022–2024	Modena	17	(0)
2023–2024	→ Virtus Entella (loan)	12	(1)
2024	→ Juve Stabia (loan)	19	(2)
2024–2026	Juve Stabia	55	(9)
2026–	Catanzaro	1	(0)

International career
2013	Italy U15	4	(0)
2013	Italy U16	1	(0)
2015	Italy U18	3	(0)
- * Club domestic league appearances and goals as of 21 August 2026

Nicola Mosti (born 7 February 1998) is an Italian professional footballer who plays as an attacking midfielder for Serie B club Catanzaro.

== Club career ==
=== Juventus ===
Born in Pietrasanta, Mosti was a youth product of Juventus.

==== Loan to Gavorrano ====
On 20 July 2017, Mosti was loaned to Serie C side Gavorrano on a season-long loan deal. On 27 August, Mosti made his Serie C debut for Gavorrano as a starter in a 2–1 away defeat against Livorno, he was replaced Simone Zaccaria in the 77th minute. On 5 November, he scored his first professional goal, as a substitute, in the 91st minute of a 2–2 away draw against Monza. On 30 December he scored his second goal, again as a substitute, in the 88th minute of a 4–3 away defeat against Olbia. In January 2018 his loan was interrupted and he returned to Juventus, leaving Gavorrano with 15 appearances, two goals and one assist.

==== Loan to Viterbese ====
On 27 January 2018, Mosti was signed by Serie C club Viterbese Castrense on a 6-month loan deal. Two weeks later, on 11 February, he made his Serie C debut for Viterbese as a substitute replacing Claudio De Sousa in the 87th minute of a 2–0 home win over Gavorrano. Five more weeks later, on 17 March, he played his first entire match for Viterbese Castrense, a 2–0 home win over Arezzo. Mosti ended his 6-month loan to Viterbese Castrense with only nine appearances, including six as a starter, and making 1 assist, however he didn't play an entire match during the second half of the season.

==== Loan to Imolese ====
On 24 August 2018, Mosti was loaned to Serie C club Imolese on a season-long loan deal. On 18 September he made his Serie C debut for Imolese in a 0–0 home draw against AlbinoLeffe; he was replaced after 54 minutes by Michael De Marchi. On 21 October he scored his first goal for Imolese in the 29th minute of a 3–1 home win over Rimini. On 22 January 2019, Mosti scored his second goal in the 32nd minute of a 2–0 away win over Teramo. On 9 February he scored his third goal in the 18th minute of a 3–2 away win over Gubbio. On 31 March he played his first entire match for the club, a 2–1 home win over Triestina. Mosti ended his season-long loan to Imolese with 39 appearances, including 26 as a starter but he played only one entire match, scoring six goals and making four assists.

==== Loan to Monza ====
On 2 August 2019, Mosti was loaned to Serie C club Monza on a season-long loan deal with option to purchase which could become obligatory if Monza reached the promotion in Serie B. On 25 August he made his debut for the club as a substitute replacing Cosimo Chiricò in the 78th minute of a 2–1 away win over Pro Patria. On 8 September he scored his first goal for the club as a substitute in the 91st minute of a 1–0 away win over Como. On 22 September he played his first match as a starter for the club and he also scored his second goal in the 49th minute of a 3–0 away win over Lecco. Mosti ended his season-long loan at Monza with 18 appearances, three goals, and one assist, helping the club win the Serie C and gain promotion to the Serie B after 19 years.

=== Monza ===
After being promoted to the Serie B, Mosti became a Monza player outright.

==== Loan to Juventus U23 ====
On 1 October 2020, Mosti was loaned back to Juventus for one year with an option for purchase; he was sent to their reserve team Juventus U23 Mosti made his debut for the club two days later, as a substitute replacing Giacomo Vrioni for the last 19 minutes of a 2–1 away win over Giana Erminio. On 17 October, Mosti played his first match as a starter for the club, a 1–1 home draw against AlbinoLeffe, he was replaced by Michele Troiano in the 89th minute. On 17 January 2021 he scored his first goal for the club in the 63rd minute of a 1–1 home draw against Piacenza. However, in late January 2021 his loan was interrupted and he return to Monza leaving Juventus U23 with 12 appearances, only 6 of them as a starter, and one goal.

==== Loan to Ascoli ====
On 1 February 2021, Mosti was loaned to Ascoli on a six-month loan, with an option for purchase. Four days later, on 5 February he made his debut for the club as a substitute replacing Abdelhamid Sabiri in the 75th minute of a 2–1 away win over Lecce. Three weeks later, on 27 February, he scored his first goal for the club, as a substitute, in the 67th minute of a 1–1 away draw against Pordenone. On 2 March, Mosti played his first match as a starter for the club, a 2–0 home defeat against Pisa, he was replaced in the 46th minute by Soufiane Bidaoui. Mosti ended his loan with 9 appearances and 1 goal.

==== Loan to Modena ====
On 16 July 2021, Mosti was sent on a one-year loan to Modena, with a conditional obligation to purchase. He made his debut on the first matchday of the season in a 0–0 draw against Grosseto. On 19 October, he scored his first goal for the club in a 2–1 away win over Pescara at Stadio Adriatico after an assist by Roberto Ogunseye.

=== Modena ===
Following Modena's Serie B promotion in 2022, Mosti's obligation for purchase clause was triggered. On 17 August 2023, Mosti moved on loan to Virtus Entella with an option to buy and a conditional obligation to buy. On 3 January 2024, he was loaned to Juve Stabia with a conditional obligation to buy.

== Career statistics ==
=== Club ===
As of match played 10 May 2021

Club	Season	League			National Cup (Note: Includes Coppa Italia)		Continental		Other		Total	
Club	Season	League	Apps	Goals	Apps	Goals	Apps	Goals	Apps	Goals	Apps	Goals
Juventus	2017–18	Serie A	—		—		—		—		0	0
Juventus	2018–19	Serie A	—		—		—		—		0	0
Juventus	2019–20	Serie A	—		—		—		—		0	0
Juventus	Total		0	0	0	0	0	0	0	0	0	0
Gavorrano (loan)	2017–18	Serie C	15	2	0	0	—		—		15	2
Viterbese (loan)	2017–18	Serie C	7	0	—		—		2 (Note: Appearances in Serie C play-off)	0	9	0
Imolese (loan)	2018–19	Serie C	36	6	0	0	—		3	0	39	6
Monza (loan)	2019–20	Serie C	18	3	0	0	—		—		18	3
Monza	2020–21	Serie B	—		—		—		—		0	0
Monza	2021–22	Serie B	—		—		—		—		0	0
Monza	Total		0	0	0	0	0	0	0	0	0	0
Juventus U23 (loan)	2020–21	Serie C	12	1	0	0	—		—		12	1
Ascoli (loan)	2020–21	Serie B	9	1	—		—		—		9	1
Modena (loan)	2021–22	Serie C	0	0	—		—		—		0	0
Career total			97	13	0	0	0	0	5	0	102	13

== Honours ==
Monza

- Serie C Group A: 2019–20
