= Eugenio Lamanna =

Italian footballer (born 1989)

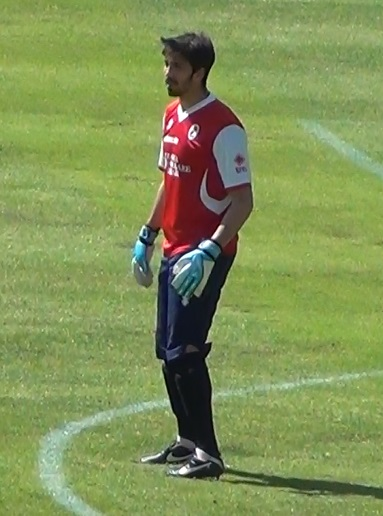
- Lamanna with Bari in 2013

Personal information
- Date of birth: 7 August 1989 (age 37)
- Place of birth: Como, Italy
- Height: 1.85 m (6 ft 1 in)
- Position: Goalkeeper

Team information
- Current team: Paradiso
- Number: 26

Senior career*
Years	Team	Apps	(Gls)
2007–2008	Como	23	(0)
2008–2012	Genoa	0	(0)
2009–2011	→ Gubbio (loan)	29	(0)
2011–2012	→ Bari (loan)	42	(0)
2012–2014	Siena	39	(0)
2012–2013	→ Bari (loan)	40	(0)
2014–2018	Genoa	43	(0)
2018–2019	Spezia	33	(0)
2019–2024	Monza	36	(0)
2024	Lecco	3	(0)
2024–2025	Südtirol	0	(0)
2026–	Paradiso	4	(0)
- * Club domestic league appearances and goals as of 26 June 2026

Eugenio Lamanna (born 7 August 1989) is an Italian professional footballer who plays as a goalkeeper for Swiss Promotion League club Paradiso.

== Career ==
=== Gubbio ===
In the 2010–11 season Lamanna suffered an injury that ruled him out for an entire month.

=== Bari (loan) ===
In summer 2011 Lamanna was signed by Bari in a temporary deal.

=== Siena ===
In summer 2012 Lamanna joined Siena for €1.5 million as part of the deal that brought Mattia Destro to Roma via Genoa from Siena. On 22 August 2012, he was sent to Bari on loan.

In July 2013 Lamanna returned to Siena for 2013–14 pre-season camp. Lamanna was expected to replace Gianluca Pegolo who was heavily linked to other clubs, a transfer completed afterwards. Lamanna was awarded no.1 shirt, previously owned by Željko Brkić in 2011–12 season.

=== Return to Genoa ===
On 20 June 2014, the co-ownership between Siena and Genoa were renewed. However, on 15 July 2014, Siena announced that they failed to acquire the license for 2014–15 Serie B, thus the club would be liquidated. On 25 July 2014, Lamanna returned to Genoa. On 5 October 2015, he signed a new contract which would last until 30 June 2019.

=== Spezia ===
On 12 July 2018, Lamanna signed with Spezia on a permanent basis.

=== Monza ===
On 13 July 2019, he signed a 3-year contract with Monza in Serie C. He stayed with Monza through two promotions to Serie A.

=== Lecco ===
On 31 January 2024, Lamanna moved to Serie B club Lecco.

=== Südtirol ===
On 24 December 2024, Lamanna signed with Südtirol until the end of the season.

== Career statistics ==
As of match played 2 March 2022

Club	Season	League			Coppa Italia		Other		Total	
Club	Season	Division	Apps	Goals	Apps	Goals	Apps	Goals	Apps	Goals
Como	2007–08	Serie D	23	0	—		0	0	23	0
Genoa	2008–09	Serie A	0	0	0	0	—		0	0
Gubbio (loan)	2009–10	Lega Pro 2D	34	0	—		14 (Note: 10 appearances in Coppa Italia Lega Pro, 4 appearances in play-offs)	0	48	0
Gubbio (loan)	2010–11	Lega Pro 1D	29	0	2	0	2 (Note: Appearances in Supercoppa di Lega Pro)	0	33	0
Gubbio (loan)	Total		63	0	2	0	16	0	81	0
Bari (loan)	2011–12	Serie B	42	0	2	0	—		44	0
Siena	2012–13	Serie A	—		—		—		—	
Siena	2013–14	Serie B	39	0	2	0	—		41	0
Siena	Total		39	0	2	0	0	0	41	0
Bari (loan)	2012–13	Serie B	40	0	0	0	—		40	0
Genoa	2014–15	Serie A	8	0	1	0	—		9	0
Genoa	2015–16	Serie A	13	0	1	0	—		14	0
Genoa	2016–17	Serie A	21	0	3	0	—		24	0
Genoa	2017–18	Serie A	1	0	2	0	—		3	0
Genoa	Total		43	0	7	0	0	0	50	0
Spezia	2018–19	Serie B	32	0	2	0	1 (Note: Appearance in play-offs)	0	35	0
Monza	2019–20	Serie C	27	0	3	0	0	0	30	0
Monza	2020–21	Serie B	8	0	0	0	—		8	0
Monza	2021–22	Serie B	1	0	0	0	—		1	0
Monza	Total		36	0	3	0	0	0	39	0
Career total			318	0	28	0	7	0	353	0

== Honours ==
Monza

- Serie C Group A: 2019–20
