= Marco D'Alessandro =

Italian footballer (born 1991)

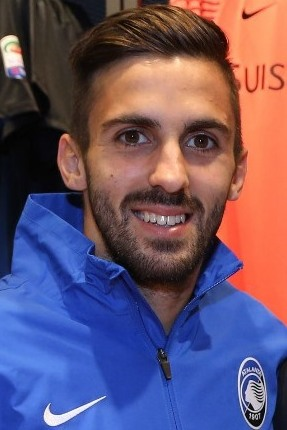
- D'Alessandro with Atalanta in 2016

Personal information
- Date of birth: 17 February 1991 (age 35)
- Place of birth: Rome, Italy
- Height: 1.73 m (5 ft 8 in)
- Position: Winger

Team information
- Current team: Catanzaro
- Number: 77

Youth career
- 2003–2005: Lazio
- 2005–2009: Roma

Senior career*
Years	Team	Apps	(Gls)
2009–2014	Roma	3	(0)
2009–2010	→ Grosseto (loan)	29	(1)
2010–2011	→ Bari (loan)	11	(0)
2011	→ Livorno (loan)	13	(0)
2011–2012	→ Verona (loan)	27	(1)
2012–2014	→ Cesena (loan)	71	(5)
2014–2020	Atalanta	72	(4)
2017–2018	→ Benevento (loan)	16	(1)
2018–2019	→ Udinese (loan)	24	(0)
2019–2020	→ SPAL (loan)	15	(2)
2020–2021	SPAL	27	(3)
2021–2024	Monza	55	(3)
2023–2024	→ Pisa (loan)	23	(3)
2024–	Catanzaro	41	(2)

International career
2007	Italy U16	4	(0)
2007–2008	Italy U17	11	(3)
2009	Italy U18	1	(0)
2009–2010	Italy U19	10	(1)
2010	Italy U20	1	(0)
2010–2011	Italy U21	10	(0)
- * Club domestic league appearances and goals as of 10 May 2026

Marco D'Alessandro (born 17 February 1991) is an Italian professional footballer who plays as a winger for Serie B club Catanzaro.

== Club career ==
=== Roma and loans ===
D'Alessandro moved his first footsteps into Lazio youth system. In 2005, he joined Roma youth teams. On 21 March 2009 he made his senior debut in Serie A as an injury time substitute against Juventus, which Roma lost 4–1.

In July 2009, he was sent to Serie B side Grosseto on a season-long loan to gain first-team experience. Grosseto also had option to co-own the player for €200,000. In June 2010 Roma activated the counter-option to pay Grosseto €350,000.

In July 2010, he was sent to Serie A side Bari in temporary deal for €300,000, with option to co-own the player for €1.5 million. Then in January 2011 he was sent to Serie B side Livorno.

In August 2011, he was sent to Serie B club Verona, with option to sign him for undisclosed fee. On 10 January 2012 he scored a goal against Lazio in Italian Cup. In June 2012 Roma activated the counter-option again, for €100,000.

In 2012, he left for Serie B club Cesena in temporary deal with option to co-own the player for €700,000. The loan was extended on 8 July 2013. Cesena also had option to sign him in co-ownership for €800,000. In June 2014 Roma activated the counter-option again for €500,000.

=== Atalanta and loans ===
On 4 July 2014, fellow Serie A club Atalanta signed D'Alessandro outright from Roma for €2 million.

On 18 July 2017, he moved to Serie A club Benevento, on a one-season loan with an obligation to make the deal permanent.

On 17 August 2018, D'Alessandro joined to Serie A side Udinese on a season-long loan, in a deal that saw Ali Adnan moving to Atalanta in exchange.

=== SPAL ===
On 10 July 2019, D'Alessandro joined SPAL on loan with an obligation to buy.

=== Monza ===
On 27 January 2021, D'Alessandro signed with Serie B club Monza on a two-and-a-half-year contract. He made his debut on 6 February, coming on as a substitute in a 1–1 draw against Empoli. On 9 February, D'Alessandro scored a goal and made an assist as a substitute, helping Monza win 2–1 away to Vicenza. On 23 October, D'Alessandro scored from a last-minute counter attack against Cittadella; Monza won 1–0.

==== Loan to Pisa ====
On 7 August 2023, D'Alessandro was loaned out to Pisa in the Serie B for one year, with an option for purchase.

=== Catanzaro ===
On 30 August 2024, D'Alessandro signed a two-year contract with Catanzaro in Serie B.

== International career ==
D'Alessandro was in the Italy U-19 team that took part at the 2010 Euro U-19 Championship. He was sent off in the first match. On 17 November 2010, he made his debut with the Italy U-21 team in a friendly match against Turkey.

== Personal life ==
D'Alessandro and his wife Corinne have two children.

== Career statistics ==
=== Club ===
As of match played 19 January 2023

Club	Season	League			Coppa Italia		Continental		Other		Total	
Club	Season	Division	Apps	Goals	Apps	Goals	Apps	Goals	Apps	Goals	Apps	Goals
Roma	2008–09	Serie A	3	0	—		—		—		3	0
Grosseto (loan)	2009–10	Serie B	29	1	1	0	—		—		30	1
Bari (loan)	2010–11	Serie A	11	0	2	1	—		—		13	1
Livorno (loan)	2010–11	Serie B	13	0	—		—		—		13	0
Verona (loan)	2011–12	Serie B	27	1	2	2	—		1 (Note: Appearance(s) in Serie B promotion play-offs)	0	30	3
Cesena (loan)	2012–13	Serie B	32	2	2	1	—		—		34	3
Cesena (loan)	2013–14	Serie B	39	3	2	0	—		3	0	44	3
Cesena (loan)	Total		71	5	4	1	0	0	3	0	78	6
Atalanta	2014–15	Serie A	25	0	2	0	—		—		27	0
Atalanta	2015–16	Serie A	23	3	2	0	—		—		25	3
Atalanta	2016–17	Serie A	24	1	3	0	—		—		27	1
Atalanta	2018–19	Serie A	0	0	0	0	1 (Note: Appearance in UEFA Europa League)	0	—		1	0
Atalanta	Total		72	4	7	0	1	0	0	0	80	4
Benevento (loan)	2017–18	Serie A	16	1	1	0	—		—		17	1
Udinese (loan)	2018–19	Serie A	24	0	0	0	—		—		24	0
SPAL (loan)	2019–20	Serie A	15	2	1	0	—		—		16	2
SPAL	2020–21	Serie B	12	1	1	0	—		—		13	1
SPAL	Total		27	3	2	0	0	0	0	0	29	3
Monza	2020–21	Serie B	16	1	—		—		2	0	18	1
Monza	2021–22	Serie B	31	2	1	0	—		4	1	36	3
Monza	2022–23	Serie A	8	0	3	0	—		—		11	0
Monza	Total		55	3	4	0	0	0	6	1	65	4
Career total			348	18	23	4	1	0	10	1	382	23
