= Giulio Donati =

Italian footballer (born 1990)

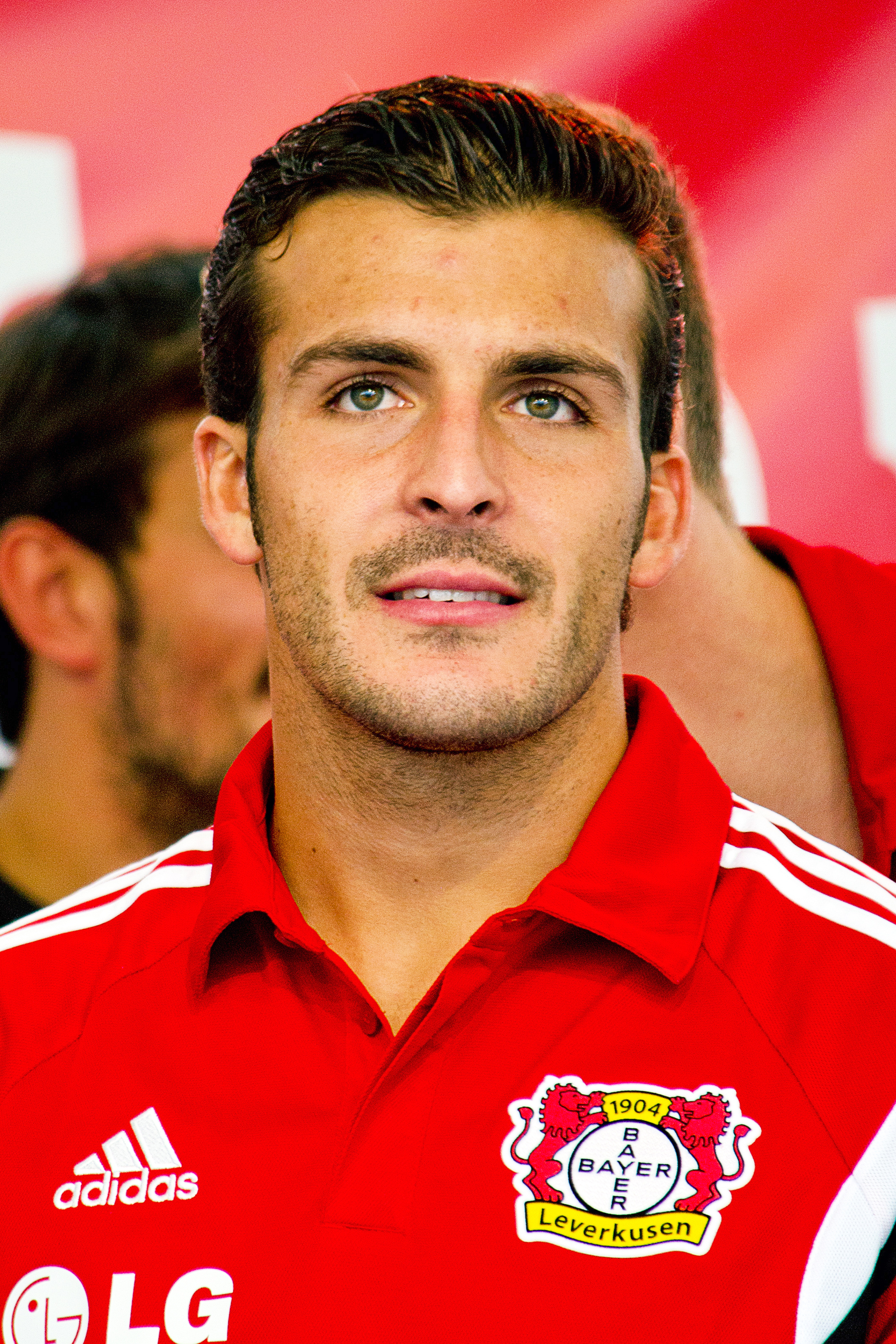
- Donati with Bayer Leverkusen in 2014

Personal information
- Date of birth: 5 February 1990 (age 36)
- Place of birth: Pietrasanta, Italy
- Height: 1.78 m (5 ft 10 in)
- Position: Right-back

Team information
- Current team: Ravenna
- Number: 2

Youth career
- 2003–2008: Lucchese
- 2008–2010: Inter Milan

Senior career*
Years	Team	Apps	(Gls)
2009–2013	Inter Milan	0	(0)
2010–2011	→ Lecce (loan)	14	(0)
2011–2012	→ Padova (loan)	28	(0)
2012–2013	→ Grosseto (loan)	27	(0)
2013–2016	Bayer Leverkusen	43	(0)
2016–2019	Mainz 05	81	(0)
2019–2020	Lecce	20	(1)
2020–2024	Monza	69	(1)
2025–	Ravenna	29	(1)

International career
2010	Italy U20	3	(0)
2010–2013	Italy U21	26	(0)
- * Club domestic league appearances and goals as of 30 April 2026

Giulio Donati (born 5 February 1990) is an Italian professional footballer who plays as a right-back for Serie C Group B club Ravenna.

== Club career ==
=== Inter Milan ===
==== Primavera and first team ====
Born in Pietrasanta, the Province of Lucca, Donati started his career at hometown club Lucchese. In July 2008, he was signed by Inter Milan and played for its Primavera team (under-20 youth team).

At the start of the 2009–10 season, Donati was called up to the first team for a number of friendlies. On 16 December 2009, he made his debut against Livorno at Coppa Italia. With both teams resting numbers of regular starters, the match ended in a 1–0 win. He subsequently also received call-ups to the next two competitive matches (against Lazio and Chievo) and started a mid-season friendly.

==== Loan to Lecce ====
On 25 June 2010, he was loaned to newly promoted Serie A team Lecce with an option to sign him in a co-ownership deal. He made 16 appearances for Lecce in a season in which the Salentini were relegated. He was also a regular for the Italian u20 and u21 sides during the season. Lecce did not take up the option to sign him on a co-ownership deal.

==== Loan to Padova ====
Donati spend the 2011–12 season on loan at Serie B side Calcio Padova. On 25 August, he made his Serie B debut with Padova in the away draw against Sampdoria. There he found regular first-team football and made a total of 30 appearances.

==== Loan to Grosseto ====
The 2012–13 season was another in which Donati was sent on loan again to a Serie B side, this time U.S. Grosseto F.C. He made 27 appearances for Grosseto and made two assists throughout the course of the season.

=== Bayer Leverkusen ===
On 21 June 2013, Bayer Leverkusen agreed a fee of €3m with Inter Milan. He took part in 23 of the 34 Bundesliga games in the 2013–14 season, assisting once in a 2–1 win over Hertha BSC. He also made six UEFA Champions League appearances in a run that saw Bayer knocked out by Paris Saint-Germain in the round of 16.

=== Mainz 05 ===
He signed for Mainz 05 on 25 January 2016 on a contract running until 2019 for an undisclosed fee. He left the club at the end of the 2018–19 season after his contract expired.

=== Return to Lecce ===
On 16 December 2019, Donati joined Serie A club Lecce after eight years. He played 20 league games, scoring one goal.

=== Monza ===
On 12 August 2020, Donati moved to newly-promoted Serie B side Monza on a three-year contract. On 21 September 2023, he signed a new one-year contract with Monza.

== Career statistics ==
=== Club ===
As of match played 23 April 2023

Club	Season	League			National cup		Continental		Other		Total	
Club	Season	Division	Apps	Goals	Apps	Goals	Apps	Goals	Apps	Goals	Apps	Goals
Inter Milan	2009–10	Serie A	0	0	1	0	0	0	—		1	0
Lecce (loan)	2010–11	Serie A	14	0	2	0	—		—		16	0
Padova (loan)	2011–12	Serie B	28	0	2	1	—		—		30	1
Grosseto (loan)	2012–13	Serie B	27	0	0	0	—		—		27	0
Bayer Leverkusen	2013–14	Bundesliga	23	0	4	0	6 (Note: Appearance(s) in UEFA Champions League)	0	—		33	0
Bayer Leverkusen	2014–15	Bundesliga	8	0	2	0	6	1	—		16	1
Bayer Leverkusen	2015–16	Bundesliga	12	0	2	0	4	0	—		18	0
Bayer Leverkusen	Total		43	0	8	0	16	1	0	0	67	1
Mainz 05	2015–16	Bundesliga	11	0	0	0	—		—		11	0
Mainz 05	2016–17	Bundesliga	32	0	1	0	4 (Note: Appearance(s) in UEFA Europa League)	0	—		37	0
Mainz 05	2017–18	Bundesliga	29	0	2	0	—		—		31	0
Mainz 05	2018–19	Bundesliga	9	0	0	0	—		—		9	0
Mainz 05	Total		81	0	3	0	4	0	0	0	88	0
Lecce	2019–20	Serie A	20	1	0	0	—		—		20	1
Monza	2020–21	Serie B	28	0	0	0	—		—		28	0
Monza	2021–22	Serie B	29	0	1	0	—		1 (Note: Appearance in Serie B promotion play-offs)	0	31	0
Monza	2022–23	Serie A	8	1	0	0	—		—		8	1
Monza	2023–24	Serie A	0	0	0	0	—		—		0	0
Monza	Total		65	1	1	0	0	0	1	0	67	1
Career total			268	2	17	1	20	1	1	0	306	4
