= Hervé Otélé =

Cameroonian footballer (born 2000)

Personal information
- Full name: Hervé Magloire Otélé Nnanga
- Date of birth: 10 January 2000 (age 26)
- Place of birth: Cameroon
- Height: 1.78 m (5 ft 10 in)
- Position: Forward

Team information
- Current team: Mazzarrone

Youth career
- –2017: Toulouse
- 2017–2018: Nantes
- 2018–2019: Monza

Senior career*
Years	Team	Apps	(Gls)
2018–2020	Monza	2	(0)
2019–2020	→ Giana Erminio (loan)	8	(0)
2020	→ Milano City (loan)	3	(0)
2020–2021	Città di Varese	30	(7)
2021–2022	Derthona	34	(5)
2023	Breno	6	(1)
2023–2024	Muret		
2024–2025	Sestese		
2025–	Mazzarrone		
- * Club domestic league appearances and goals as of 22:54, 18 June 2023 (UTC)

Hervé Magloire Otélé Nnanga (born 10 January 2000) is a Cameroonian footballer who plays as a forward for Italian club Mazzarrone.

Born in Cameroon, Otélé also holds French citizenship. He is a versatile forward, capable of playing as a winger or a second striker.

== Career ==
On 9 June 2018, Monza announced the signing of Otélé on a three-year contract. During the 2018–19 season, Otélé played two games in the Serie C with the senior team. He also played 14 games for the under-19 side in the Campionato Berretti, scoring five goals.

Otélé was sent on a one-year loan to Giana Erminio on 18 July 2019, where he played eight Serie C games. On 31 January 2020, he moved to Serie D club Milano City on a six-month loan. Otélé made his debut for Milano City on 2 February 2020 against Levico; he ended the season with three games.

On 8 August 2020, Otélé moved to newly founded Serie D club Città di Varese on a free contract. On 22 November 2020, he scored a brace to help Città di Varese win 4–0 against Fossano. Otélé finished the season with seven goals in 30 games.

On 13 August 2021, Otélé joined Serie D side Derthona. He moved to Breno during the January 2023 transfer window.

== Career statistics ==
As of match played 15 May 2022

Appearances and goals by club, season and competition
Club	Season	League			Coppa Italia		Other		Total	
Club	Season	Division	Apps	Goals	Apps	Goals	Apps	Goals	Apps	Goals
Monza	2018–19	Serie C	2	0	0	0	1 (Note: Appearance in Coppa Italia Serie C)	0	3	0
Monza	2019–20	Serie C	—		—		—		0	0
Monza	Total		2	0	0	0	1	0	3	0
Giana Erminio (loan)	2019–20	Serie C	8	0	0	0	1	0	9	0
Milano City (loan)	2019–20	Serie D	3	0	—		—		3	0
Città di Varese	2020–21	Serie D	30	7	—		—		30	7
Derthona	2021–22	Serie D	34	5	—		2 (Note: Appearance in Coppa Italia Serie D)	0	36	5
Career total			77	12	0	0	4	0	81	12
