= Federico Marchesi =

Italian footballer

Personal information
- Date of birth: 8 February 1999 (age 27)
- Place of birth: Bergamo, Italy
- Height: 1.87 m (6 ft 2 in)
- Position: Midfielder

Team information
- Current team: Sorrento
- Number: 99

Youth career
- –2014: Atalanta
- 2014–2017: Milan
- 2017–2018: Lazio
- 2019–2020: Monza

Senior career*
Years	Team	Apps	(Gls)
2016	AC Milan	0	(0)
2018–2019	Lazio	0	(0)
2018	→ Pro Piacenza (loan)	4	(0)
2019–2020	Monza	0	(0)
2019–2020	→ Lecco (loan)	14	(1)
2020–2023	Pro Sesto	65	(2)
2023–2024	Rimini	13	(1)
2024–2025	Giana Erminio	4	(0)
2025	→ Pianese (loan)	8	(2)
2025–2026	Livorno	31	(2)
2026–	Sorrento	1	(0)
- * Club domestic league appearances and goals as of 29 August 2026

Federico Marchesi (born 8 February 1999) is an Italian professional footballer who plays as a midfielder for Serie C Group C club Sorrento.

== Club career ==
He made one appearance for AC Milan on 8 October 2016 in a friendly game against Chiasso.

He made his Serie C debut for Pro Piacenza on 23 September 2018 in a game against Alessandria.

On 24 January 2019, Monza announced the acquisition of Federico Marchesi on a free from Pro Piacenza. On 9 July 2019, he was loaned to Lecco.

On 21 September 2020, Marchesi joined Pro Sesto on a permanent deal.

On 1 September 2023, Marchesi signed with Rimini.

On 29 July 2024, Marchesi joined Giana Erminio on a two-year contract.
