= Filippo Lora =

Italian footballer

Personal information
- Date of birth: 21 November 1993 (age 32)
- Place of birth: Valdagno, Italy
- Height: 1.75 m (5 ft 9 in)
- Position: Midfielder

Team information
- Current team: Vado

Youth career
- Milan

Senior career*
| Years | Team | Apps | (Gls) |
| 2012–2013 | Milan | 0 | (0) |
| 2013–2018 | Cittadella | 64 | (6) |
| 2019–2020 | Monza | 14 | (1) |
| 2019–2020 | → Ravenna (loan) | 23 | (1) |
| 2020–2022 | Lecco | 52 | (1) |
| 2022–2024 | Torres | 47 | (0) |
| 2024– | Vado | 0 | (0) |
- * Club domestic league appearances and goals as of 4 May 2024

Filippo Lora (born 21 November 1993) is an Italian professional footballer who plays as a midfielder for Serie D club Vado.

== Club career ==
=== Early career ===
Lora is a product of the A.C. Milan Youth Academy. He joined the U19 squad in 2010, spending three years there. He never made a senior appearance for the club. Before going to Milan, he spent time with Nuova Valdagno, Schio, and Vicenza.

=== Cittadella ===
In July 2013, Lora left for Cittadella. In his first season, he helped the club to avoid relegation to the Serie C. His debut and first start came in a 0–0 draw away against Spezia on 24 August 2013. In the 92nd minute, he was given a straight red card. Cittadella would go on to end the match with nine men, with Massimiliano Busellato seeing a second yellow card three minutes after Lora did. His first goal came around two and a half years later, in a 4–2 home victory, following relegation to Serie C, against A.C. Renate on 30 January 2016. His goal was the third of four for his side and came in the 71st minute.

=== Monza ===
On 20 November 2018, Monza announced the signing of Filippo Lora from Cittadella on a permanent deal.

==== Loan to Ravenna ====
On 29 August 2019, he joined Ravenna on loan.

=== Lecco ===
On 30 September 2020, Lora joined Serie C side Lecco on a permanent deal.

=== Torres ===
On 10 August 2022, Lora moved to Torres.
