= Davide Bettella =

Italian footballer (born 2000)

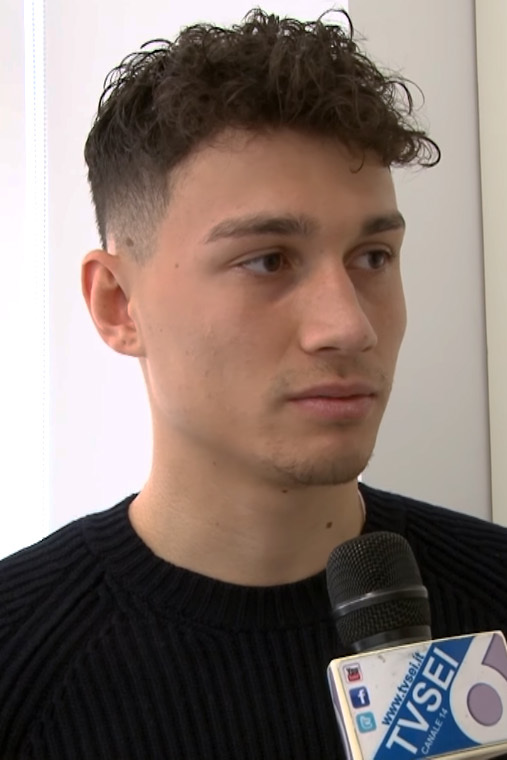
- Bettella in 2019

Personal information
- Full name: Davide Bettella
- Date of birth: 7 April 2000 (age 26)
- Place of birth: Padua, Italy
- Height: 1.85 m (6 ft 1 in)
- Position: Centre-back

Team information
- Current team: Juve Stabia
- Number: 87

Youth career
- 2015–2018: Inter Milan
- 2018–2019: Atalanta

Senior career*
Years	Team	Apps	(Gls)
2018–2022	Atalanta	0	(0)
2019–2020	→ Pescara (loan)	29	(2)
2020–2022	→ Monza (loan)	24	(2)
2022–2024	Monza	1	(0)
2022–2023	→ Palermo (loan)	19	(0)
2024–2025	Frosinone	18	(0)
2025–2026	Catanzaro	12	(0)
2026	Pescara	16	(0)
2026–	Juve Stabia	1	(0)

International career^{‡}
2015	Italy U15	8	(1)
2015–2016	Italy U16	12	(1)
2015–2017	Italy U17	15	(1)
2017–2019	Italy U19	25	(3)
2018–2019	Italy U20	6	(0)
2019–2020	Italy U21	3	(0)
- * Club domestic league appearances and goals as of 23 August 2026 ‡ National team caps and goals as of 3 September 2020

Davide Bettella (born 7 April 2000) is an Italian professional footballer who plays as a centre-back for Serie B club Juve Stabia.

== Club career ==
=== Inter ===
Bettella is a youth product of Inter Milan, and started playing for their under-19 squad in the 2017–18 season. He also represented the club in the 2007–18 UEFA Youth League, he missed the last penalty kick in the shootout as Inter was eliminated by Manchester City in the Round of 16.

=== Atalanta ===
On 29 June 2018, he signed a contract with Atalanta, with Inter holding option to re-purchase his rights. He made several bench appearances for the squad in the first half of the 2018–19 Serie A season.

==== Loan to Pescara ====
On 14 January 2019, he joined Serie B club Pescara on loan until June 2020.

He made his Serie B debut for Pescara on 22 April 2019 in a game against Carpi, as a starter.

=== Monza ===
On 11 September 2020, Bettella joined Serie B side Monza on loan until 30 June 2022, with option and conditional obligation to purchase. He scored his first goals on 19 December, in the form of a brace, against his former club Pescara; despite his two goals, Monza lost 3–2 away from home. Following Monza's Serie A promotion on 29 May 2022, Bettella's obligation for purchase clause was triggered.

==== Loan to Palermo ====
On 19 August 2022, newly-promoted Serie B club Palermo announced the signing of Bettella on a loan deal with an option to buy.

=== Frosinone ===
On 30 August 2024, Bettella joined Frosinone for one season, with the club holding an option to extend.

=== Catanzaro ===
On 30 July 2025, Bettella signed a two-season contract with Catanzaro.

=== Return to Pescara ===
On 23 January 2026, Bettella returned to Pescara on a two-and-a-half-year deal.

== International career ==
He was first called up to represent his country in 2015 for the Under-15 squad.

He represented the Under-17 team at the 2017 UEFA European Under-17 Championship (Italy did not advance from the group stage).

For the Under-19 squad, he scored the goal in the last qualification game that secured a spot for Italy at the 2018 UEFA European Under-19 Championship. Italy reached the final at the competition, where they lost to Portugal in a shootout.

After the tournament, Bettella continued to be age-eligible for the squad and became its captain, as it qualified for the 2019 edition of the tournament. However he took part in the 2019 FIFA U-20 World Cup with the Italy U20 squad, reaching the fourth place.

He made his debut with the Italy U21 on 14 October 2019, in a qualifying match won 1–0 against Armenia.

== Career statistics ==
=== Club ===
As of match played 29 May 2022

Club	Season	League			Coppa Italia		Continental		Other		Total	
Club	Season	Division	Apps	Goals	Apps	Goals	Apps	Goals	Apps	Goals	Apps	Goals
Atalanta	2018–19	Serie A	0	0	0	0	0	0	—		0	0
Pescara (loan)	2018–19	Serie B	3	1	0	0	—		2 (Note: Appearance(s) in play-offs)	0	5	1
Pescara (loan)	2019–20	Serie B	26	1	2	0	—		2	0	30	1
Pescara (loan)	Total		29	2	2	0	0	0	4	0	35	1
Monza (loan)	2020–21	Serie B	17	2	1	0	—		1	0	19	2
Monza (loan)	2021–22	Serie B	7	0	0	0	—		2	0	9	0
Monza (loan)	Total		24	2	1	0	0	0	3	0	28	2
Career total			53	4	3	0	0	0	7	0	63	4

== Honours ==
Italy U19

- UEFA European Under-19 Championship runner-up: 2018
