= Luca Palesi =

Italian footballer (born 1997)

Personal information
- Date of birth: 12 February 1997 (age 29)
- Place of birth: Melegnano, Milan, Italy
- Height: 1.79 m (5 ft 10 in)
- Position: Midfielder

Team information
- Current team: Varese

Youth career
- 2014–2016: Genoa

Senior career*
Years	Team	Apps	(Gls)
2016–2020	Monza	35	(0)
2019	→ Giana Erminio (loan)	10	(0)
2019–2020	→ Pro Patria (loan)	17	(1)
2020–2021	Pro Sesto	32	(3)
2021–2023	Olbia	19	(0)
2022	→ Ancona-Matelica (loan)	9	(0)
2023–2024	Olbia	0	(0)
2024–2025	Sangiuliano City	35	(4)
2025–	Varese	33	(1)
- * Club domestic league appearances and goals as of 25 June 2026

Luca Palesi (born 17 February 1997) is an Italian footballer who plays as a midfielder for Serie D Group A club Varese.

== Club career ==
On 31 January 2019, he joined Giana Erminio on loan from Monza. On 16 July 2019, he was loaned to Pro Patria. Palesi joined Pro Sesto on 13 August 2020 on a permanent deal.

On 17 July 2021, he signed a two-year contract with Olbia. On 18 January 2022, he joined Ancona-Matelica on loan.

On 12 October 2023, Serie D club Sangiuliano City announced the signing of Palesi.

== Honours ==
Monza

- Serie D: 2016–17
- Scudetto Dilettanti: 2016–17
