= Gianluca Barba =

Italian footballer

Personal information
- Date of birth: 27 February 1995 (age 31)
- Place of birth: Fiorenzuola d'Arda, Italy
- Height: 1.72 m (5 ft 8 in)
- Position: Midfielder

Youth career
- 2011–2013: Atalanta

Senior career*
Years	Team	Apps	(Gls)
2013–2015	Atalanta	0	(0)
2014–2015	→ Pro Piacenza (loan)	19	(1)
2015–2018	Pescara	0	(0)
2015–2016	→ Pro Piacenza (loan)	28	(5)
2016–2017	→ Piacenza (loan)	18	(0)
2017–2018	→ Pro Piacenza (loan)	33	(6)
2018–2020	Monza	16	(0)
2019	→ Giana Erminio (loan)	14	(0)
2019–2020	→ Pontedera (loan)	26	(3)
2020–2022	Pontedera	72	(6)
2022–2025	Arzignano	84	(4)
- * Club domestic league appearances and goals as of 25 April 2025

Gianluca Barba (born 27 February 1995) is an Italian footballer who plays as a midfielder.

== Career ==
Born in Fiorenzuola, Barba began his career on hometown's Atalanta's youth categories, and was promoted to main squad for 2013–14 season, receiving the no. 92 jersey.

On 4 December 2013 Barba made his professional debut, starting in a 2-0 home win over Sassuolo, for the campaign's Coppa Italia.

On 27 June 2015 Barba was signed by Serie B club Pescara, with Denis Di Rocco moved to opposite direction. Both players were tagged for €1.5 million, making a paper profit of about €1.5 million on both side. Barba returned to Pro Piacenza on loan in July 2015.

On 14 July 2016 Barba was signed by city rival Piacenza Calcio 1919.

In June 2018, he was signed by Serie C club Monza after spending two seasons with Pro Piacenza. On 24 January 2019, he joined Giana Erminio on loan. On 1 July 2019, he joined Pontedera on loan.

On 1 September 2020, Barba permanently joined Pontedera on a free contract.

On 8 July 2022, he signed with Arzignano.
