= Filippo Scaglia =

Italian footballer

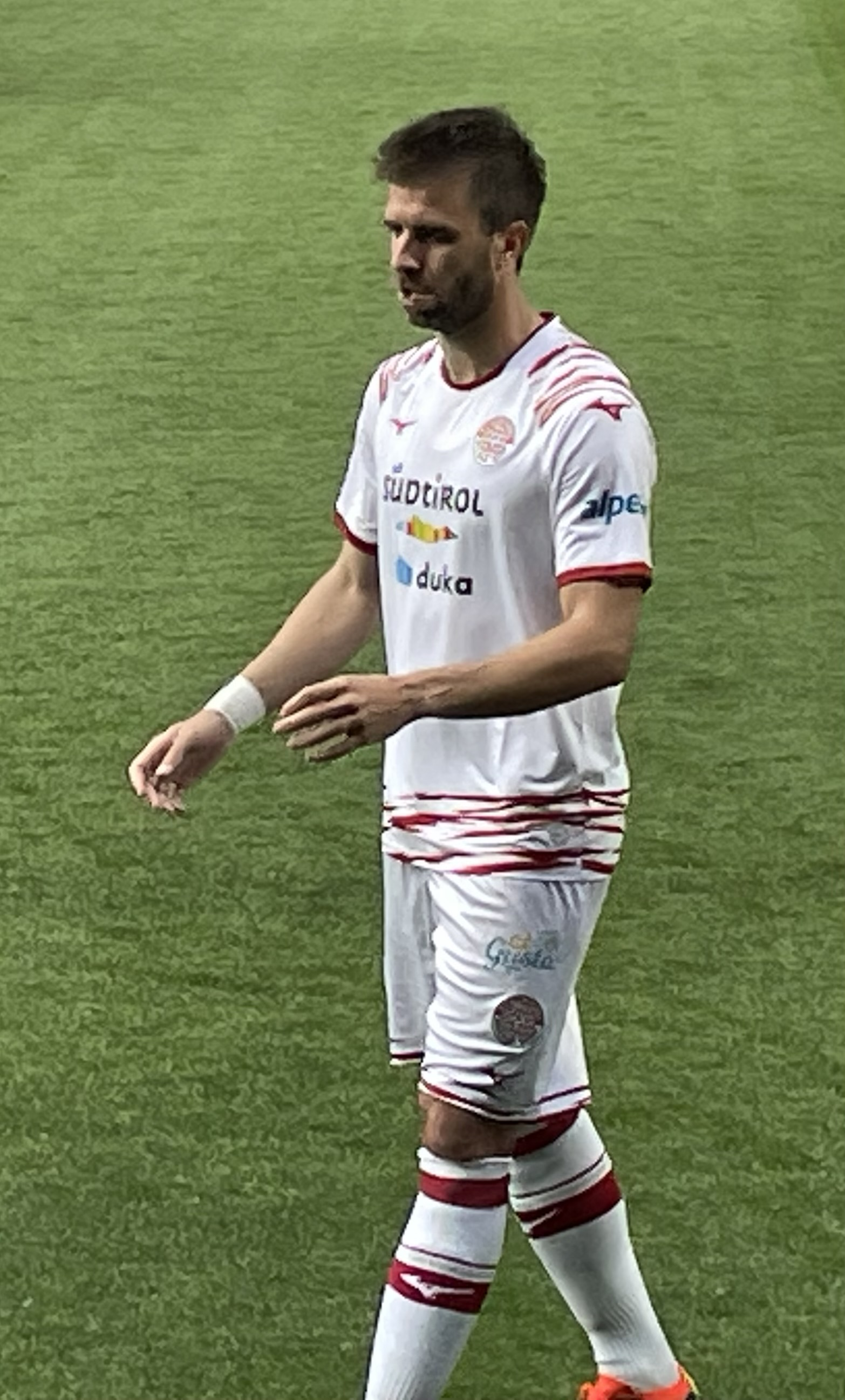
- Scaglia in 2024

Personal information
- Date of birth: 31 January 1992 (age 34)
- Place of birth: Turin, Italy
- Height: 1.90 m (6 ft 3 in)
- Position: Centre-back

Youth career
- 2010–2014: Torino

Senior career*
Years	Team	Apps	(Gls)
2010–2014	Torino	0	(0)
2011–2012	→ Bassano Virtus (loan)	22	(0)
2011–2012	→ Cuneo (loan)	22	(1)
2014–2018	Cittadella	138	(4)
2019–2021	Monza	51	(3)
2021–2024	Como	51	(0)
2024	Südtirol	15	(0)
2024–2026	Juventus Next Gen	44	(0)

International career
2013	Italy U20	0	(0)
- * Club domestic league appearances and goals

Filippo Scaglia (born 31 January 1992) is an Italian former professional footballer who played as a centre-back.

== Club career ==
=== Early career ===
Born in Turin, Scaglia is a product of the youth academy of Torino. In the summer of 2011, he moved on loan to Bassano, a team of Lega Pro Prima Divisione; he closed his first season among the professionals with 22 league appearances with the Venetian team, and was subsequently transferred (also on loan) to Cuneo on 19 July 2012. With the Piedmont team he disputed another 22 games of the Lega Pro Prima Divisione (plus one in Coppa Italia and one in the Coppa Italia Lega Pro, a competition in which on 4 October 2012 he scored his first goal, in the game lost 3–2 to Tritium). He also scored his first goal in the professional leagues on November 4, 2012, in the match won 2–0 against Pavia. In the first part of the 2013–14 season he remained with Torino in Serie A; however, he never made his debut in official matches from the Granata, who on 28 January 2014 loaned him to Cittadella in Serie B with the option to redeem 50% of his contract in co-ownership.

=== Cittadella ===
After playing 18 games (during which he also scored his first goal in Serie B), the Venetians redeemed half 50% of his contract and reconfirmed him for the 2014–15 season, played again in Serie B, but did not manage to avoid relegation of the club finished in last place. He was in the Top 15 of defenders of Serie B according to a list compiled by the Lega Serie B.

=== Monza ===
On 7 January 2019, he signed a 2.5-year contract with Monza.

=== Como ===
On 13 July 2021, Scaglia moved to Como on a two-year contract.

=== Südtirol ===
On 8 January 2024, Scaglia signed with Südtirol until 30 June 2025.

=== Juventus Next Gen ===
On 11 July 2024, Scaglia joined Serie C team Juventus Next Gen, the reserve squad of Juventus, on a two-year contract.

== Career statistics ==
=== Club ===
As of match played 30 September 2024

Club	Season	League			Coppa Italia		Other		Total	
Club	Season	Division	Apps	Goals	Apps	Goals	Apps	Goals	Apps	Goals
Torino	2010-11	Serie B	0	0	0	0	—		0	0
Torino	2013-14	Serie A	0	0	0	0	—		0	0
Torino	Total		0	0	0	0	—		0	0
Bassano Virtus (loan)	2011-12	Lega Pro Prima Divisione	22	0	0	0	—		22	0
Cuneo (loan)	2012-13	Lega Pro Prima Divisione	22	1	1	0	0	0	23	1
Cittadella	2013-14	Serie B	18	1	0	0	—		18	1
Cittadella	2014-15	Serie B	32	1	1	0	—		33	1
Cittadella	2015-16	Serie C	30	0	0	0	—		30	0
Cittadella	2016-17	Serie B	34	2	0	0	0	0	34	2
Cittadella	2017-18	Serie B	24	0	0	0	0	0	24	0
Cittadella	2018-19	Serie B	0	0	0	0	0	0	0	0
Cittadella	Total		138	4	1	0	0	0	139	4
Monza	2018-19	Serie C	15	0	0	0	4 (Note: Appearance(s) in Serie C Promotion play-offs)	0	19	0
Monza	2019-20	Serie C	23	2	3	0	—		26	2
Monza	2020-21	Serie B	9	1	2	0	1 (Note: Appearance(s) in Serie B Promotion play-offs)	0	12	1
Monza	Total		47	3	5	0	5	0	57	3
Como	2021-22	Serie B	25	0	0	0	—		25	0
Como	2022-23	Serie B	26	0	1	0	—		27	0
Como	2023-24	Serie B	0	0	0	0	—		0	0
Como	Total		51	0	1	0	0	0	52	0
Südtirol	2023-24	Serie B	15	0	0	0	—		15	0
Juventus Next Gen	2024-25	Serie C	6	0	—		—		6	0
Career total			301	8	8	0	5	0	314	8

== Honours ==
Cittadella

- Lega Pro: 2015–16

Monza

- Serie C Group A: 2019–20
