= Tommaso Morosini =

Italian footballer (born 1991)

Personal information
- Date of birth: 8 October 1991 (age 35)
- Place of birth: Ponte San Pietro, Italy
- Height: 1.85 m (6 ft 1 in)
- Position: Midfielder

Youth career
- –2007: Inter Milan
- 2007–2010: AlbinoLeffe

Senior career*
Years	Team	Apps	(Gls)
2010–2011	AlbinoLeffe	1	(0)
2010–2011	→ Prato (loan)	19	(0)
2011–2012	Bassano Virtus	20	(2)
2012–2013	Ascoli	16	(1)
2014–2015	Catanzaro	15	(0)
2015	→ Savona (loan)	10	(0)
2015–2017	Virtus Bergamo	63	(12)
2017–2018	Piacenza	20	(3)
2018–2020	Südtirol	54	(15)
2020	→ Monza (loan)	8	(1)
2020–2023	Monza	0	(0)
2020–2021	→ Feralpisalò (loan)	24	(4)
2021–2022	→ Lecco (loan)	22	(3)
2022–2023	→ Sangiuliano (loan)	19	(3)
- * Club domestic league appearances and goals as of 13:45, 1 July 2023 (UTC)

Tommaso Morosini (born 8 October 1991) is an Italian professional footballer who plays as a midfielder.

== Club career ==
Morosini made his Serie B debut for AlbinoLeffe on 30 May 2010 in a game against Reggina.

On 7 January 2020, he joined Serie C side Monza on loan. If he reached agreed performance targets, Monza was obligated to purchase his rights permanently at the end of the loan. Those targets were met, and Monza purchased his rights. On 21 September 2020, Morosini was sent on a one-year loan to Feralpisalò.

On 26 August 2021, Morosini was sent on a one-year loan to Lecco. On 18 July 2022, he moved on loan to Sangiuliano, newly promoted to Serie C. After returning from loan, Morosini was released by Monza on mutual terms on 4 July 2023.

== Honours ==
Monza

- Serie C Group A: 2019–20
