= Stefano Negro =

Italian footballer

Personal information
- Date of birth: 28 June 1995 (age 31)
- Place of birth: Biella, Italy
- Height: 1.93 m (6 ft 4 in)
- Position: Centre-back

Team information
- Current team: Casarano
- Number: 34

Youth career
- 2013–2014: Varese
- 2014–2016: Pro Vercelli

Senior career*
| Years | Team | Apps | (Gls) |
| 2016–2017 | Pro Piacenza | 0 | (0) |
| 2017 | Pro Vercelli | 1 | (0) |
| 2017–2021 | Monza | 48 | (3) |
| 2020 | → Viterbese (loan) | 7 | (1) |
| 2020–2021 | → Perugia (loan) | 12 | (1) |
| 2021–2022 | Triestina | 19 | (1) |
| 2022–2023 | Pordenone | 16 | (2) |
| 2023–2025 | Cittadella | 26 | (2) |
| 2025–2026 | Trapani | 14 | (0) |
| 2026– | Casarano | 4 | (0) |
- * Club domestic league appearances and goals as of 1 May 2026

Stefano Negro (born 28 June 1995) is an Italian professional footballer who plays as a centre-back for Serie C Group C club Casarano.

== Club career ==
On 28 January 2020, Negro joined Viterbese on loan. On 16 September 2020, he moved to Perugia on a one-year loan.

On 31 August 2021, Negro moved to Triestina on a permanent deal.

On 19 July 2022, Negro signed a two-year contract with Pordenone.

On 17 October 2023, he joined Serie B club Cittadella.
