= Alessandro Di Munno =

Italian footballer (born 2000)

Personal information
- Date of birth: 3 September 2000 (age 26)
- Place of birth: Bresso, Italy
- Height: 1.80 m (5 ft 11 in)
- Position: Defensive midfielder

Team information
- Current team: Vado
- Number: 21

Youth career
- 2015–2016: Sampdoria
- 2016–2017: Como
- 2017–2018: Monza

Senior career*
Years	Team	Apps	(Gls)
2018–2021	Monza	0	(0)
2018–2019	→ Caronnese (loan)	34	(4)
2020	→ Vis Pesaro (loan)	3	(0)
2020–2021	→ Pro Sesto (loan)	25	(1)
2021	Lecco	1	(0)
2021–2025	Novara	90	(3)
2025–2026	Pro Patria	29	(1)
2026–	Vado	2	(0)
- * Club domestic league appearances and goals as of 28 August 2026

Alessandro Di Munno (born 3 September 2000) is an Italian professional footballer who plays as a defensive midfielder for Serie C Group B club Vado.

== Career ==
=== Monza and loans ===
Di Munno joined Monza's youth system in 2017. He was sent on loan to Caronnese in the Serie D for the 2018–19 season, where he scored four goals in 34 league appearances. On 23 January 2020, Di Munno was sent on a six-month loan to Serie C side Vis Pesaro. On 17 September 2020, he was sent on a one-year loan to newly-promoted Serie C side Pro Sesto.

=== Lecco ===
On 26 August 2021, Di Munno was sold to Lecco on a permanent transfer. On 27 November 2021, his Lecco contract was terminated by mutual consent.

=== Novara ===
On 27 November 2021, he moved to Novara in Serie D.
