= Milano City FC =

Italian football club

Milano City
- Full name: Milano City Football Club
- Founded: 2017
- Dissolved: 2021
- Ground: Stadio Roberto Battaglia, Busto Garolfo, Italy
- Capacity: 650
- Chairman: Salvatore Varano
- Manager: Francesco Passiatore
- League: Eccellenza
Home colours	Away colours

Milano City Football Club was a football club located in Busto Garolfo, Lombardy, Italy.

== History ==
On 28 June 2017, Milano City Football Club was founded as a continuation of Serie D club Bustese Calcio.

Following an Eccellenza campaign in the 2020–21 season, the club did not apply to play in the following one, thus being effectively dissolved.
