= Armando Anastasio =

Italian footballer (born 1996)

Personal information
- Date of birth: 24 July 1996 (age 30)
- Place of birth: Naples, Italy
- Height: 1.80 m (5 ft 11 in)
- Position: Left-back

Team information
- Current team: Salernitana
- Number: 33

Youth career
- Napoli

Senior career*
Years	Team	Apps	(Gls)
2014–2019	Napoli	0	(0)
2015–2016	→ Padova (loan)	9	(0)
2016–2017	→ AlbinoLeffe (loan)	30	(3)
2017	→ Carpi (loan)	0	(0)
2018	→ Parma (loan)	8	(0)
2018–2019	→ Cosenza (loan)	3	(0)
2019	→ Monza (loan)	18	(2)
2019–2024	Monza	23	(2)
2020	→ Rijeka (loan)	1	(0)
2021–2022	→ Reggiana (loan)	6	(0)
2022	→ Pordenone (loan)	5	(0)
2022–2023	→ Pro Vercelli (loan)	30	(1)
2023–2024	→ Casertana (loan)	39	(2)
2024–2025	Catania	31	(3)
2025–	Salernitana	26	(2)

International career
2014	Italy U18	5	(0)
2014	Italy U19	3	(0)
- * Club domestic league appearances and goals as of 1 May 2026

Armando Anastasio (born 24 July 1996) is an Italian professional footballer who plays as a left-back for Serie C Group C club Salernitana.

== Club career ==
Grew up in the youth of Napoli, he began his football career in Padova and, the following year on loan from Napoli, to Albinoleffe.

=== Monza and loans ===
On 15 January 2019, he joined Monza on loan. On 18 July 2019, he returned to Monza on a permanent basis, signing a 4-year contract.

On 6 October 2020, Anastasio was sent on a one-year loan to Croatian side Rijeka. He was recalled from loan on 18 January 2021. On 31 August 2021, Anastasio moved to Reggiana on a one-year loan. His loan was cut short on 26 January 2022, when he was loaned out to Pordenone for the remainder of the season. On 1 September 2022, he joined Pro Vercelli on a one-year loan. On 6 September 2023, Anastasio was loaned to Casertana.

=== Catania ===
On 8 July 2024, Anastasio joined Catania on a permanent deal.

== Honours ==
Monza

- Serie C Group A: 2019–20
