= Ettore Gliozzi =

Italian footballer (born 1995)

Personal information
- Date of birth: 23 September 1995 (age 31)
- Place of birth: Siderno, Italy
- Height: 1.80 m (5 ft 11 in)
- Position: Striker

Team information
- Current team: Mantova
- Number: 9

Youth career
- –2012: Sassuolo

Senior career*
| Years | Team | Apps | (Gls) |
| 2012–2020 | Sassuolo | 1 | (0) |
| 2015 | → Forlì (loan) | 2 | (0) |
| 2015–2017 | → Südtirol (loan) | 67 | (24) |
| 2017 | → Cesena (loan) | 8 | (0) |
| 2018 | → Padova (loan) | 11 | (0) |
| 2018–2019 | → Robur Siena (loan) | 33 | (15) |
| 2019–2020 | → Monza (loan) | 23 | (2) |
| 2020–2021 | Monza | 0 | (0) |
| 2020–2021 | → Cosenza (loan) | 30 | (7) |
| 2021–2022 | Como | 37 | (9) |
| 2022–2024 | Pisa | 36 | (10) |
| 2024–2026 | Modena | 74 | (16) |
| 2026– | Mantova | 1 | (0) |

International career
| 2013 | Italy U18 | 2 | (0) |
| 2013–2014 | Italy U19 | 3 | (1) |
- * Club domestic league appearances and goals as of 22 August 2026

Ettore Gliozzi (Italian pronunciation: [ˈɛttore ʎˈʎɔttsi]; born 23 September 1995) is an Italian professional footballer who plays as a striker for Serie B club Mantova.

== Club career ==
On 24 September 2020, Gliozzi was sent on a year-long loan to Cosenza from Monza. He moved to Como on a permanent deal on 10 August 2021.

In January 2024, Gliozzi joined Modena in a part-exchange deal for Nicholas Bonfanti.

== Honours ==
Monza

- Serie C Group A: 2019–20
