= Andrea Mazza =

Italian footballer (born 2004)

Personal information
- Full name: Andrea Sergio Mazza
- Date of birth: 19 March 2004 (age 22)
- Place of birth: Milan, Italy
- Height: 1.90 m (6 ft 3 in)
- Position: Goalkeeper

Team information
- Current team: Giana Erminio
- Number: 22

Youth career
- Monza

Senior career*
Years	Team	Apps	(Gls)
2025	Monza	1	(0)
2025–	Giana Erminio	21	(0)
- * Club domestic league appearances and goals as of 30 April 2026

Andrea Sergio Mazza (born 19 March 2004) is an Italian professional footballer who plays as goalkeeper for Serie C Group A club Giana Erminio.

== Career ==
Mazza began his youth career at Monza, and first made the matchday squad in a Serie B match against Venezia on 21 March 2021. On 31 July 2024, he signed his first professional contract with Monza until 2027, after helping their under-19 team achieve promotion to the Campionato Primavera 1. Mazza made his senior and professional debut with Monza on 24 May 2025, as a substitute in a 2–0 Serie A defeat to AC Milan.

On 6 August 2025, Mazza signed a two-season contract with Giana Erminio in Serie C.
