= Edoardo Colferai =

Italian footballer (born 2002)

Personal information
- Date of birth: 21 May 2002 (age 24)
- Place of birth: Milan, Italy
- Height: 1.77 m (5 ft 10 in)
- Position: Forward

Team information
- Current team: Associazione Calcio ChievoVerona

Youth career
- 2008–2011: Vimodronese
- 2011–2013: Cimiano
- 2013–2014: Pro Sesto
- 2014–2021: Monza
- 2016–2017: → Renate (loan)

Senior career*
Years	Team	Apps	(Gls)
2020–2021	Monza	0	(0)
2021–2023	VillaValle	53	(2)
2023–	ChievoVerona	42	(7)
- * Club domestic league appearances and goals as of 15:31, 16 January 2025 (UTC)

Edoardo Colferai (born 21 May 2002) is an Italian footballer who plays as a forward for Serie D Group B club ChievoVerona.

== Career ==
=== Early career ===
Born in Milan, Italy, on 21 May 2002, Colferai began his youth career at local club Vimodronese between 2008 and 2011. He then played for Cimiano for two seasons, joining Pro Sesto for the 2013–14 season.

=== Monza ===
==== 2014–2021: Youth career ====
In 2014, Colferai moved to Monza's youth system. Initially starting with the under-13 team, Colferai had a short stint at Renate's under-15s in the 2016–17 season; he played for Monza's under-16s in the 2017–18 season. Colferai was promoted to the under-17s in 2018–19, where he scored five goals.

The following season he played for the under-19s in the Campionato Nazionale Dante Berretti. During the 2020–21 season, Colferai played with the under-19s in the Campionato Primavera 2; he scored nine goals and made two assists between the league and cup.

==== 2020: Senior debut ====
Coming through the youth system, Colferai made his senior professional debut for Monza on 27 October 2020, in a Coppa Italia third round match against Pordenone. He was sent off in the 41st minute after receiving a second yellow card; Monza won the match on penalties.

=== VillaValle ===
On 8 July 2021, Colferai joined Serie D side VillaValle on a permanent transfer.

== Style of play ==
Colferai is a forward who is capable of playing as a winger on both flanks, or as a second striker. He is right-footed, and is noted for his technique, ball control and dribbling.
