= Marco Armellino =

Italian footballer

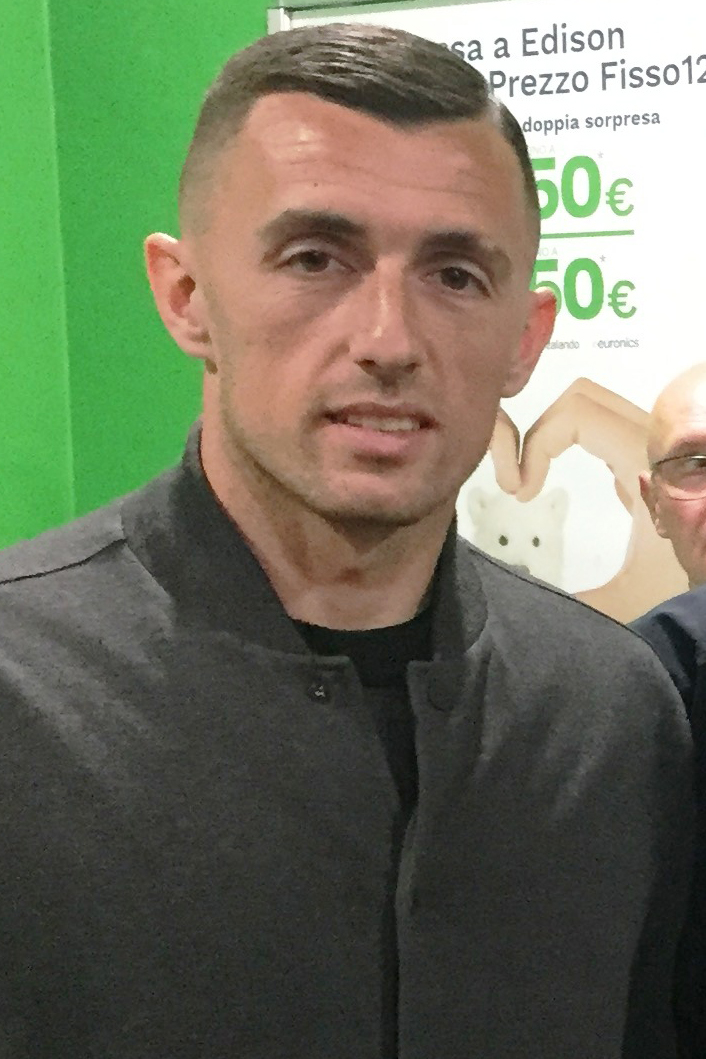
- Armellino in 2020

Personal information
- Date of birth: 21 August 1989 (age 37)
- Place of birth: Vico Equense, Italy
- Height: 1.86 m (6 ft 1 in)
- Position: Midfielder

Senior career*
Years	Team	Apps	(Gls)
2008–2010	Vico Equense	63	(3)
2010–2012	Sorrento	42	(0)
2012–2015	Reggina	74	(5)
2013–2014	→ Cremonese (loan)	24	(3)
2015–2017	Matera	60	(13)
2017–2019	Lecce	42	(4)
2019–2021	Monza	72	(7)
2021–2023	Modena	65	(5)
2023–2026	Avellino	66	(2)
- * Club domestic league appearances and goals as of 8 May 2026

Marco Armellino (born 21 August 1989) is an Italian professional footballer who plays as a midfielder.

== Club career ==
Born in Vico Equense, Campania, Armellino followed his hometown club promoted to the fourth division in 2009. However, after a season in the professional league the club folded. In 2010, he was signed by the third division club Sorrento, also in the Campania region. In January 2012, Armellino was signed by Serie B club Reggina.

On 2 August 2013, he joined Cremonese in temporary deal.

At the beginning of the 2014–15 season for Reggina, he wore the captain's armband under coach Francesco Cozza. He was replaced as captain later in the season by Bruno Cirillo.

On 27 July 2015, Armellino was signed by Matera.

On 9 August 2017, Armellino was signed by Lecce. he scored 3 goals in 34 matches, helping the giallorossi side to gain promotion to Serie B.

He started the 2018–19 season with Lecce and scored one goal in 8 appearances, but on 21 January 2019 he joined Monza on a permanent basis.

On 24 August 2021, Armellino joined Modena on a permanent basis. He made his debut on 29 August in a 0–0 draw against Grosseto. On 19 September, he scored his first goal for the club to secure a 4–0 away win over Fermana at Stadio Bruno Recchioni.

On 29 August 2023, Armellino signed a two-year contract with Avellino.

== Personal life ==
Armellino and his partner, Rosaria, have a son called Mattia, born on 17 June 2020.

== Honours ==
Lecce

- Serie C Group C: 2017–18

Monza

- Serie C Group A: 2019–20
