= 2022–23 AC Monza season =

Monza
2022–23 season
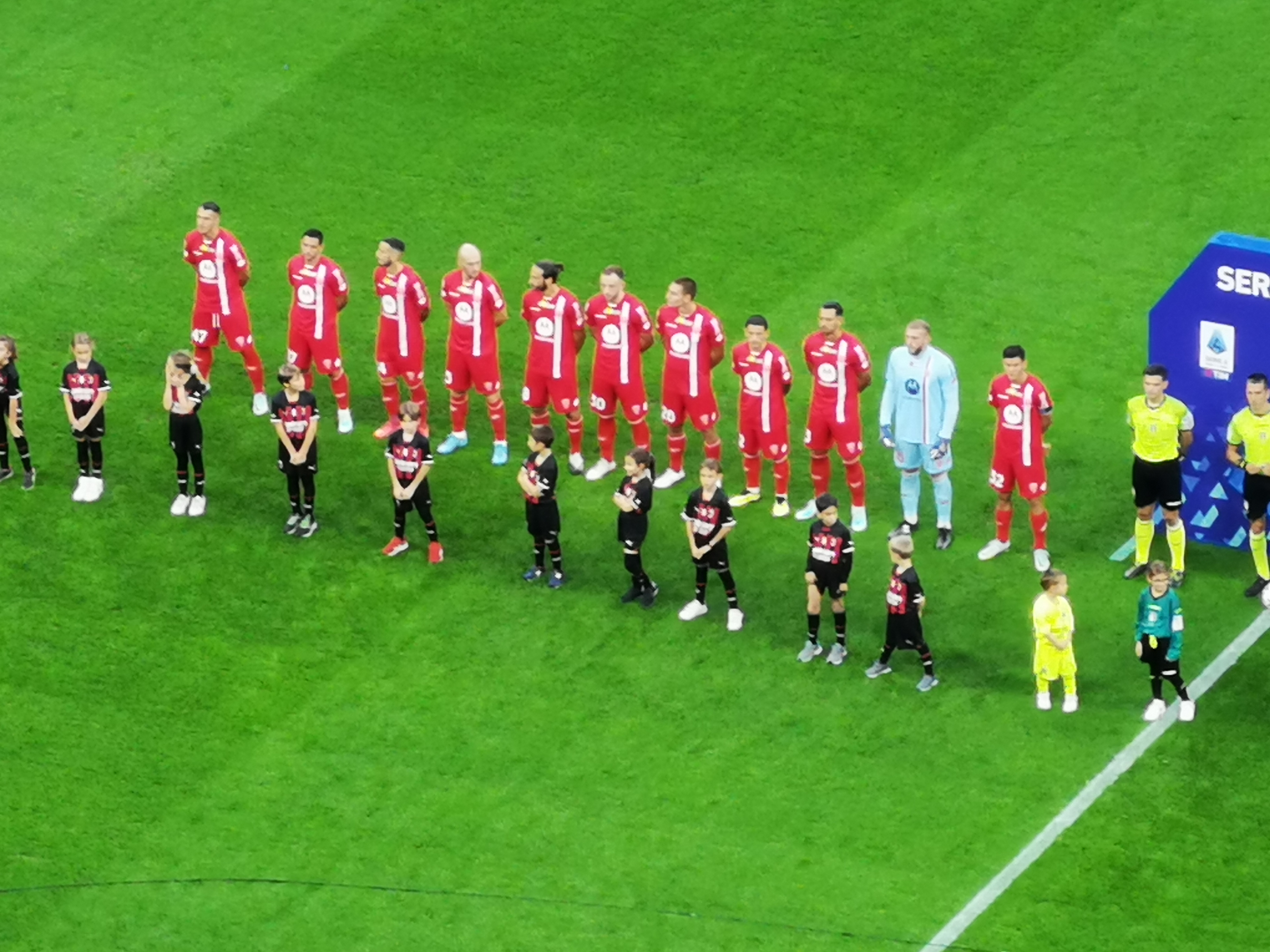
- Monza players lining up before the game away to AC Milan
- Owner: Silvio Berlusconi
- Honorary chairman: Paolo Berlusconi
- Head coach: Giovanni Stroppa (until 13 September); Raffaele Palladino (from 13 September)
- Stadium: Stadio Brianteo
- Serie A: 11th
- Coppa Italia: Round of 16
- Top goalscorer: League: Carlos Augusto; Patrick Ciurria (6 each); All: Carlos Augusto; Gianluca Caprari; Patrick Ciurria (6 each)
- Highest home attendance: 15,039 (vs Lecce, 28 May)
- Lowest home attendance: 4,532 (vs Frosinone, 7 August)
- Average home league attendance: 12,019
- Biggest win: Sampdoria 0–3 Monza (2 October 2022); Monza 3–0 Salernitana (13 November 2022)
- Biggest defeat: Napoli 4–0 Monza (21 August 2022)
Home colours	Away colours	Third colours

The 2022–23 season was Associazione Calcio Monza's first season in the Serie A, the first level of Italian football, following their promotion in the 2021–22 season. They finished in 11th place in the league, and reached the round of 16 in the Coppa Italia, the Italian domestic cup.

== Pre-season and friendlies ==
Monza played six pre-season friendly games in July 2022.

Results list Monza's goal tally first.

Date	Opponent	Venue	Result	Scorers
10 July 2022	Bellinzona	Away	0–0	
13 July 2022	Lugano II	Home	4–0	Birindelli 31', Colpani (3) 51', 66', 79'
20 July 2022	Piacenza	Home	4–1	Valoti 3', Mota 34', A. Ranocchia 46', Siatounis 60'
25 July 2022	Renate	Home	4–0	Colpani 32', Gytkjær (2) 52', 84', Ferrini 62' (o.g.)
30 July 2022	Novara	Home	5–0	Ciurria (2) 7', 78, Valoti (2) 15', 30' (pen.), Caprari 16'
31 July 2022	Sangiuliano City	Home	3–2	Antov (2) 32', 82', Carlos 77'

== Serie A ==
=== Matches ===
Results list Monza's goal tally first.

Date	Opponent	Venue	Result	Monza scorers	Attendance	Position
13 August 2022	Torino	Home	1–2	Mota 90+5'	10,739	14th
21 August 2022	Napoli	Away	0–4		36,599	20th
26 August 2022	Udinese	Home	1–2	Colpani 32'	9,955	20th
30 August 2022	Roma	Away	0–3		60,669	20th
5 September 2022	Atalanta	Home	0–2		11,970	20th
11 September 2022	Lecce	Away	1–1	Sensi 35'	23,391	20th
18 September 2022	Juventus	Home	1–0	Gytkjær 74'	12,878	18th
2 October 2022	Sampdoria	Away	3–0	Pessina 11', Caprari 67', Sensi 90+5'	19,806	16th
9 October 2022	Spezia	Home	2–0	Carlos 32', Marí 63'	12,094	12th
15 October 2022	Empoli	Away	0–1		7,528	14th
22 October 2022	AC Milan	Away	1–4	F. Ranocchia 70'	72,938	15th
31 October 2022	Bologna	Home	1–2	Petagna 57' (pen.)	11,388	15th
6 November 2022	Hellas Verona	Home	2–0	Carlos 68', Colpani 90'	11,723	15th
10 November 2022	Lazio	Away	0–1		35,000	15th
13 November 2022	Salernitana	Home	3–0	Carlos 24', Mota 35', Pessina 76' (pen.)	12,372	14th
4 January 2023	Fiorentina	Away	1–1	Carlos 61'	32,190	15th
7 January 2023	Inter Milan	Home	2–2	Ciurria 11', Dumfries 90+3' (o.g.)	13,622	15th
14 January 2023	Cremonese	Away	3–2	Ciurria 8', Caprari (2) 19' (pen.), 55'	11,467	13th
22 January 2023	Sassuolo	Home	1–1	Caprari 60'	10,200	13th
29 January 2023	Juventus	Away	2–0	Ciurria 18', Mota 39'	39,393	11th
6 February 2023	Sampdoria	Home	2–2	Petagna 32', Pessina 90+9' (pen.)	11,950	11th
12 February 2023	Bologna	Away	1–0	Donati 25'	21,692	10th
18 February 2023	AC Milan	Home	0–1		14,012	11th
26 February 2023	Salernitana	Away	0–3		14,247	11th
4 March 2023	Empoli	Home	2–1	Ciurria 19', Izzo 67'	10,601	11th
12 March 2023	Hellas Verona	Away	1–1	Sensi 55'	18,061	12th
18 March 2023	Cremonese	Home	1–1	Carlos 69'	12,797	13th
2 April 2023	Lazio	Home	0–2		14,539	13th
8 April 2023	Udinese	Away	2–2	Colpani 48', Rovella 56'	22,658	13th
15 April 2023	Inter Milan	Away	1–0	Caldirola 78'	74,135	13th
23 April 2023	Fiorentina	Home	3–2	Biraghi 26' (o.g.), Mota 43', Pessina 59' (pen.)	13,118	12th
28 April 2023	Spezia	Away	2–0	Ciurria 21', Carlos 90+3'	9,200	10th
3 May 2023	Roma	Home	1–1	Caldirola 39'	12,388	10th
7 May 2023	Torino	Away	1–1	Caprari 86'	19,517	12th
14 May 2023	Napoli	Home	2–0	Mota 18', Petagna 24'	14,455	9th
19 May 2023	Sassuolo	Away	2–1	Ciurria 60', Pessina 90+3'	11,745	8th
28 May 2023	Lecce	Home	0–1		15,039	10th
4 June 2023	Atalanta	Away	2–5	Colpani 51, Petagna 81'	19,389	11th

=== League table ===
Pos	Team	Pld	W	D	L	GF	GA	GD	Pts
9	Bologna	38	14	12	12	53	49	+4	54
10	Torino	38	14	11	13	42	41	+1	53
11	Monza	38	14	10	14	48	52	−4	52
12	Udinese	38	11	13	14	47	48	−1	46
13	Sassuolo	38	12	9	17	47	61	−14	45

Source: Serie A
Rules for classification: 1) Points; 2) Tiebreaker for Champions team and third relegated team; 3) Head-to-head points; 4) Head-to-head goal difference; 5) Goal difference; 6) Goals scored; 7) Draw. (Note: Head-to-head record is used only after all the matches between the teams in question have been played)

== Coppa Italia ==
Monza entered the round of 64 in the Coppa Italia, and played at home against Serie B side Frosinone on 7 August 2022. They won 3–2, via two first-half penalty goals, and advanced to the round of 32 against Serie A side Udinese.

Results list Monza's goal tally first.

Date	Round	Opponent	Venue	Result	Scorers	Attendance
7 August 2022	Round of 64	Frosinone	Home	3–2	Valoti 25' (pen.), Caprari 43' (pen.), Gytkjær 83'	4,532
19 October 2022	Round of 32	Udinese	Away	3–2	Valoti 45', Molina 70', Petagna 72'	5,034
11 January 2023	Round of 16	Juventus	Away	1–2	Valoti 24'	25,190

== Player details ==
As of match played 4 June 2023

No.	Pos	Nat	Player	Total		Serie A		Coppa Italia	
No.	Pos	Nat	Player	Apps	Goals	Apps	Goals	Apps	Goals
1	GK	(Italy) ITA	Eugenio Lamanna	0	0	0	0	0	0
2	DF	(Italy) ITA	Giulio Donati	8	1	4+4	1	0	0
3	DF	(Spain) ESP	Pablo Marí	31	1	28+2	1	1	0
4	DF	(Brazil) BRA	Marlon	30	0	18+10	0	2	0
5	DF	(Italy) ITA	Luca Caldirola	31	2	27+4	2	0	0
6	MF	(Italy) ITA	Nicolò Rovella	27	1	21+4	1	1+1	0
7	MF	(Equatorial Guinea) GEQ	José Machín	27	0	11+14	0	1+1	0
8	MF	(Italy) ITA	Andrea Barberis	10	0	3+6	0	1	0
9	FW	(Denmark) DEN	Christian Gytkjær	24	2	3+19	1	1+1	1
10	MF	(Italy) ITA	Mattia Valoti	19	3	4+12	0	3	3
11	MF	(Argentina) ARG	Franco Carboni	3	0	0+3	0	0	0
12	MF	(Italy) ITA	Stefano Sensi	30	3	21+7	3	0+2	0
13	DF	(Italy) ITA	Andrea Ranocchia	2	0	1	0	1	0
16	GK	(Italy) ITA	Michele Di Gregorio	37	0	37	0	0	0
17	FW	(Italy) ITA	Gianluca Caprari	38	6	32+5	5	1	1
19	DF	(Italy) ITA	Samuele Birindelli	33	0	14+17	0	2	0
20	MF	(Greece) GRE	Antonis Siatounis	0	0	0	0	0	0
22	MF	(Italy) ITA	Filippo Ranocchia	16	1	5+9	1	2	0
23	MF	(Italy) ITA	Matteo Scozzarella	0	0	0	0	0	0
24	FW	(Croatia) CRO	Mirko Marić	0	0	0	0	0	0
25	DF	(Italy) ITA	Gabriele Ferrarini	0	0	0	0	0	0
26	DF	(Bulgaria) BUL	Valentin Antov	12	0	2+7	0	2+1	0
28	MF	(Italy) ITA	Andrea Colpani	30	4	10+17	4	2+1	0
29	DF	(Italy) ITA	Gabriel Paletta	1	0	0	0	1	0
30	DF	(Brazil) BRA	Carlos Augusto	37	6	35	6	1+1	0
32	MF	(Italy) ITA	Matteo Pessina	36	5	34+1	5	1	0
34	DF	(Italy) ITA	Luca Marrone	3	0	2	0	0+1	0
37	FW	(Italy) ITA	Andrea Petagna	32	5	19+12	4	0+1	1
38	MF	(France) FRA	Warren Bondo	1	0	0	0	0+1	0
44	DF	(Italy) ITA	Andrea Carboni	6	0	1+3	0	2	0
47	FW	(Portugal) POR	Dany Mota	30	5	21+8	5	1	0
55	DF	(Italy) ITA	Armando Izzo	31	1	29+1	1	0+1	0
60	MF	(Italy) ITA	Leonardo Colombo (Note: Youth player)	0	0	0	0	0	0
61	FW	(Italy) ITA	Andrea Ferraris	0	0	0	0	0	0
62	FW	(Spain) ESP	Leo Dos Reis	0	0	0	0	0	0
63	DF	(Italy) ITA	Sheriff Kassama	0	0	0	0	0	0
69	MF	(Italy) ITA	Nicola Rigoni	0	0	0	0	0	0
77	MF	(Italy) ITA	Marco D'Alessandro	11	0	3+5	0	3	0
79	MF	(Italy) ITA	Salvatore Molina	6	1	1+4	0	0+1	1
80	MF	(Italy) ITA	Samuele Vignato	7	0	0+5	0	0+2	0
84	FW	(Italy) ITA	Patrick Ciurria	37	6	31+5	6	1	0
89	GK	(Italy) ITA	Alessio Cragno	4	0	1	0	3	0
91	GK	(Italy) ITA	Alessandro Sorrentino	0	0	0	0	0	0

== Transfers ==
=== Summer ===
Arrivals
Date	Pos.	Player	From	Type	Fee	Ref.
1 July 2022	GK	(Italy) Alessio Cragno	Cagliari	Loan	€400,000	
1 July 2022	DF	(Italy) Andrea Carboni	Cagliari	Permanent	€4 million	
1 July 2022	DF	(Italy) Andrea Ranocchia	Inter Milan	Free transfer		
2 July 2022	MF	(Italy) Stefano Sensi	Inter Milan	Loan	Free	
6 July 2022	MF	(Italy) Matteo Pessina	Atalanta	Loan	Free	
7 July 2022	DF	(Italy) Samuele Birindelli	Pisa	Permanent	€1.5 million	
13 July 2022	GK	(Italy) Alessandro Sorrentino	Pescara	Permanent	€1 million	
21 July 2022	FW	(Italy) Gianluca Caprari	Hellas Verona	Loan	€3 million	
21 July 2022	MF	(Italy) Filippo Ranocchia	Juventus	Loan	Free	
28 July 2022	MF	(France) Warren Bondo	(France) Nancy	Free transfer		
5 August 2022	DF	(Brazil) Marlon	(Ukraine) Shakhtar Donetsk	Loan	Free	
11 August 2022	DF	(Spain) Pablo Marí	(England) Arsenal	Loan	N/A	
12 August 2022	FW	(Italy) Andrea Petagna	Napoli	Loan	N/A	
31 August 2022	FW	(Italy) Nicolò Rovella	Juventus	Loan	N/A	
1 September 2022	DF	(Italy) Gabriele Ferrarini	Fiorentina	Loan	N/A	
1 September 2022	DF	(Italy) Armando Izzo	Torino	Loan	N/A	
Other transfers (Note: Players part of the previous season's first-team squad, or who were not included in this season's first-team squad.): Date / Pos. / Player / From / Type / Fee / Ref.; 1 July 2022 / GK / (Italy) Michele Di Gregorio / Inter Milan / Loan redemption / €4 million; 1 July 2022 / DF / (Bulgaria) Valentin Antov / (Bulgaria) CSKA Sofia / Loan redemption / €2 million; 1 July 2022 / DF / (Italy) Davide Bettella / Atalanta / Loan redemption / €5 million; 1 July 2022 / DF / (Portugal) Pedro Pereira / (Portugal) Benfica / Loan redemption / €2.5 million; 1 July 2022 / MF / (Italy) Andrea Colpani / Atalanta / Loan redemption / €9 million; 1 July 2022 / MF / (Italy) Mattia Valoti / SPAL / Loan redemption / €4 million; 1 July 2022 / FW / (Italy) Leonardo Mancuso / Empoli / Loan redemption / €3 million; 1 July 2022 / DF / (Italy) Armando Anastasio / Pordenone / Return from loan / N/A; 1 July 2022 / DF / (Italy) Giuseppe Bellusci / Ascoli / Return from loan / N/A; 1 July 2022 / MF / (Italy) Luca Lombardi / Vis Pesaro / Return from loan / N/A; 1 July 2022 / MF / (Italy) Tommaso Morosini / Lecco / Return from loan / N/A; 1 July 2022 / MF / (Italy) Nicola Mosti / Modena / Return from loan / N/A; 1 July 2022 / MF / (Italy) Nicola Rigoni / Cesena / Return from loan / N/A; 1 July 2022 / FW / (Italy) Davide Diaw / Vicenza / Return from loan / N/A; 1 July 2022 / FW / (Croatia) Mirko Marić / Crotone / Return from loan / N/A; 29 July 2022 / GK / (Italy) Stefano Rubbi / Lecco / Return from loan / N/A

Departures
Date	Pos.	Player	To	Type	Fee	Ref.
1 July 2022	MF	(Uruguay) Gastón Ramírez	Released			
1 July 2022	DF	(Italy) Lorenzo Pirola	Inter Milan	Return from loan		
1 July 2022	MF	(Italy) Marco Brescianini	AC Milan	Return from loan		
1 July 2022	FW	(Italy) Andrea Favilli	Genoa	Return from loan		
13 July 2022	GK	(Italy) Daniele Sommariva	Pescara	Permanent	Undisclosed	
26 July 2022	FW	(Italy) Leonardo Mancuso	Como	Loan	Free	
29 July 2022	GK	(Italy) Stefano Rubbi	Pergolettese	Loan	Free	
18 August 2022	DF	(Portugal) Pedro Pereira	(Turkey) Alanyaspor	Loan	Free	
19 August 2022	DF	(Italy) Davide Bettella	Palermo	Loan	Free	
23 August 2022	MF	(Italy) Luca Mazzitelli	Frosinone	Loan	Free	
24 August 2022	DF	(Italy) Mario Sampirisi	Frosinone	Loan	Free	
Other transfers (Note: Players not part of the previous season's first-team squad, or who were included in this season's first-team squad.): Date / Pos. / Player / To / Type / Fee / Ref.; 1 July 2022 / GK / (Italy) Michele Di Gregorio / Inter Milan / Return from loan / N/A; 1 July 2022 / DF / (Bulgaria) Valentin Antov / (Bulgaria) CSKA Sofia / Return from loan / N/A; 1 July 2022 / DF / (Italy) Davide Bettella / Atalanta / Return from loan / N/A; 1 July 2022 / DF / (Portugal) Pedro Pereira / (Portugal) Benfica / Return from loan / N/A; 1 July 2022 / MF / (Italy) Andrea Colpani / Atalanta / Return from loan / N/A; 1 July 2022 / MF / (Italy) Mattia Valoti / SPAL / Return from loan / N/A; 1 July 2022 / FW / (Italy) Leonardo Mancuso / Empoli / Return from loan / N/A; 1 July 2022 / MF / (Italy) Nicola Mosti / Modena / Loan redemption / Undisclosed; 10 July 2022 / DF / (Italy) Giuseppe Bellusci / Ascoli / Permanent / Undisclosed; 13 July 2022 / MF / (Italy) Luca Lombardi / Pescara / Permanent / Undisclosed; 15 July 2022 / GK / (Italy) Stefano Rubbi / Lecco / Loan / N/A; 18 July 2022 / MF / (Italy) Tommaso Morosini / Sangiuliano City / Loan / N/A; 19 July 2022 / FW / (Italy) Davide Diaw / Modena / Loan / N/A; 1 September 2022 / DF / (Italy) Armando Anastasio / Pro Vercelli / Loan / N/A

=== Winter ===
Arrivals
Date	Pos.	Player	From	Type	Fee	Ref.
24 January 2023	MF	(Argentina) Franco Carboni	Inter Milan	Loan	Free	
Other transfers: Date / Pos. / Player / From / Type / Fee / Ref.

Departures
Date	Pos.	Player	To	Type	Fee	Ref.
21 September 2022	DF	(Italy) Andrea Ranocchia	Released (Note: He retired on 22 September 2022.)		N/A	
2 January 2023	MF	(Greece) Antonis Siatounis	Virtus Entella	Permanent	Undisclosed	
31 January 2023	DF	(Italy) Andrea Carboni	Venezia	Loan	Free	
31 January 2023	DF	(Italy) Gabriele Ferrarini	Fiorentina	Return from loan	N/A	
31 January 2023	MF	(France) Warren Bondo	Reggina	Loan	Free	
31 January 2023	MF	(Italy) Salvatore Molina	Bari	Permanent	Undisclosed	
31 January 2023	MF	(Italy) Matteo Scozzarella	Released			
Other transfers: Date / Pos. / Player / To / Type / Fee / Ref.; 20 January 2023 / MF / (Italy) Nicola Rigoni / Released; 31 January 2023 / MF / (Italy) Luca Prinelli / Virtus Francavilla / Permanent / Undisclosed
