= 2022–23 Delfino Pescara 1936 season =

Delfino Pescara 1936
2022–23 season
- Chairman: Daniele Sebastiani
- Manager: Alberto Colombo
- Stadium: Stadio Adriatico
- Serie C: 3rd
- Coppa Italia Serie C: First round

The 2022–23 Delfino Pescara 1936 season is the club's 87th season in existence and its second consecutive season in the third division of Italian football. In addition to the domestic league, Pescara are participating in this season's edition of the Coppa Italia Serie C. The season covers the period from 1 July 2022 to 30 June 2023.

== Players ==
=== First-team squad ===
As of 2 February 2023

Note: Flags indicate national team as defined under FIFA eligibility rules; some limited exceptions apply. Players may hold more than one non-FIFA nationality.

No.	Pos.	Nation	Player
1	GK	ITA	Daniele Sommariva
2	DF	ITA	Lorenzo Milani
3	DF	ITA	Alessandro Crescenzi
5	MF	ITA	Luca Palmiero
6	MF	ITA	Emmanuel Gyabuaa (on loan from Atalanta)
7	FW	ALB	Aristidi Kolaj
8	MF	ITA	Salvatore Aloi
9	FW	ITA	Edoardo Vergani
10	FW	ARG	Facundo Lescano
11	FW	ITA	Marco Delle Monache (on loan from Sampdoria)
13	DF	ITA	Riccardo Brosco
16	DF	ITA	Etienne Catena
17	MF	TUN	Hamza Rafia
18	DF	SLO	Matija Boben (on loan from Ternana)
19	MF	ITA	Luca Mora

No.	Pos.	Nation	Player
20	MF	ALB	Erdis Kraja (on loan from Atalanta)
21	FW	ITA	Jacopo Desogus (on loan from Cagliari)
22	GK	ITA	Alessandro Plizzari
23	DF	ITA	Filippo Pellacani
24	DF	SVK	Ivan Mesík
25	MF	BIH	Amer Mehic
27	FW	ITA	Luigi Cuppone (on loan from Cittadella)
28	DF	ITA	Gianmarco Ingrosso
29	DF	ITA	Tommaso Cancellotti
30	FW	ITA	Davide Merola (on loan from Empoli)
31	GK	ITA	Andrea D'Aniello
32	DF	ITA	Paolo Gozzi (on loan from Genoa)
40	MF	MDA	Cornelius Staver
88	MF	ITA	Gianluca Germinario

=== Out on loan ===
Note: Flags indicate national team as defined under FIFA eligibility rules; some limited exceptions apply. Players may hold more than one non-FIFA nationality.

No.	Pos.	Nation	Player
—	DF	ITA	Gianluca Longobardi (at Recanatese until 30 June 2023)
—	DF	ITA	Manuel Vessella (at Fermana until 30 June 2023)
—	MF	ITA	Luca Lombardi (at Alessandria until 30 June 2023)
—	FW	MDA	Vladislav Blănuță (at FC U Craiova until 30 June 2023)

No.	Pos.	Nation	Player
—	FW	SRB	Miloš Bočić (at Frosinone until 30 June 2023)
—	FW	ARG	Nicolas Belloni (at Latina until 30 June 2023)
—	FW	ITA	Gennaro Borrelli (at Frosinone until 30 June 2023)
—	FW	SVK	Ľubomír Tupta (at Slovan Liberec until 30 June 2023)

== Pre-season and friendlies ==
Win Draw Loss Fixtures

August 2022 Friendly	(Italy)	v	(Italy) Delfino Pescara 1936
CEST (UTC+2)

== Competitions ==
=== Overview ===
Competition	First match	Last match	Starting round	Record							
Competition	First match	Last match	Starting round	Pld	W	D	L	GF	GA	GD	Win %
Serie C	4 September 2022	May 2023	Matchday 1	0	0	0	0	0	0	+0	—
Coppa Italia Serie C	5 October 2022		First round	0	0	0	0	0	0	+0	—
Total				0	0	0	0	0	0	+0	—

Last updated: March 2023
Source: [ Soccerway]

=== Serie C ===
==== League table ====
Pos	Team	Pld	W	D	L	GF	GA	GD	Pts	Qualification
1	Catanzaro (P)	38	30	6	2	102	21	+81	96	Promotion to Serie B. Qualification for the Supercoppa di Serie C
2	Crotone	38	23	11	4	57	31	+26	80	Qualification for the promotion play-offs national phase
3	Pescara	38	19	8	11	58	42	+16	65	Qualification for the promotion play-offs national phase
4	Foggia	38	18	7	13	60	44	+16	61	Qualification for the promotion play-offs group phase
5	Audace Cerignola	38	16	12	10	48	41	+7	60	Qualification for the promotion play-offs group phase

Updated to match(es) played on 16 April 2023. Source: Lega Pro, Soccerway (in English)
Rules for classification: 1) Points; 2) Head-to-head points; 3) Head-to-head goal difference; 4) Goal difference; 5) Goals scored; 6) Lower goals against; 7) Wins; 8) Lower losses; 9) Away wins; 10) Lower home losses.
(P) Promoted

==== Results summary ====
Overall								Home						Away					
Pld	W	D	L	GF	GA	GD	Pts	W	D	L	GF	GA	GD	W	D	L	GF	GA	GD
0	0	0	0	0	0	0	0	0	0	0	0	0	0	0	0	0	0	0	0

Last updated: March 2023.

==== Results by round ====
Round	1
Ground	
Result	
Position	

Updated to match(es) played on March 2023. Source:
A = Away; H = Home; W = Win; D = Draw; L = Loss

==== Matches ====
September 2022	Delfino Pescara 1936	–
CET (UTC+1)

=== Coppa Italia Serie C ===
5 October 2022 First round	Delfino Pescara 1936	v
CET (UTC+1)
