= Maldini (name) =

- Language: Italian

Maldini is a surname and given name. Notable people with the name include:

== Surname ==
- Cesare Maldini (1932–2016), Italian footballer
- Christian Maldini (born 1996), Italian footballer, son of Paolo
- Daniel Maldini (born 2001), Italian footballer, son of Paolo
- Federico Nilo Maldini (born 2001), Italian sport shooter
- Paolo Maldini (born 1968), Italian footballer, son of Cesare.

== Given name ==
- Maldini Kacurri (born 2005), Albanian footballer
- Maldini Pali (born 1995), Indonesian footballer
