= 2021 UEFA European Under-21 Championship qualification Group 7 =

Football tournament qualification stage

Group 7 of the 2021 UEFA European Under-21 Championship qualifying competition consisted of six teams: Portugal, Netherlands, Norway, Belarus, Cyprus, and Gibraltar. The composition of the nine groups in the qualifying group stage was decided by the draw held on 11 December 2018, 09:00 CET (UTC+1), at the UEFA headquarters in Nyon, Switzerland, with the teams seeded according to their coefficient ranking.

The group was originally scheduled to be played in home-and-away round-robin format between 20 March 2019 and 13 October 2020. Under the original format, the group winners and the best runners-up among all nine groups (not counting results against the sixth-placed team) would qualify directly for the final tournament, while the remaining eight runners-up would advance to the play-offs.

On 17 March 2020, all matches were put on hold due to the COVID-19 pandemic. On 17 June 2020, UEFA announced that the qualifying group stage would be extended and end on 17 November 2020, while the play-offs, originally scheduled to be played in November 2020, would be cancelled. Instead, the group winners and the five best runners-up among all nine groups (not counting results against the sixth-placed team) would qualify for the final tournament.

== Standings ==
Pos	Team	Pld	W	D	L	GF	GA	GD	Pts	Qualification	Netherlands	Portugal	Norway	Belarus	Cyprus	Gibraltar
1	Netherlands	10	9	0	1	46	5	+41	27 (Note: Ranked on head-to-head goal difference: Netherlands +1, Portugal −1.)	Final tournament	—	4–2	2–0	5–0	5–1	5–0
2	Portugal	10	9	0	1	29	9	+20	27	Final tournament	2–1	—	4–1	3–0	2–1	4–0
3	Norway	8	3	1	4	14	16	−2	10		0–4	2–3	—	Canc.	2–1	6–0
4	Belarus	9	2	2	5	15	21	−6	8		0–7	0–2	1–1	—	1–2	10–0
5	Cyprus	9	2	1	6	8	24	−16	7		0–7	0–4	1–2	1–1	—	1–0
6	Gibraltar	8	0	0	8	0	37	−37	0		0–6	0–3	Canc.	0–2	Canc.	—

Rules for classification: Tiebreakers

== Matches ==
Times are CET/CEST, (Note: CEST (UTC+2) for dates between 31 March and 26 October 2019 and between 29 March and 24 October 2020, and CET (UTC+1) for all other dates.) as listed by UEFA (local times, if different, are in parentheses).

20 March 2019
14:30 (15:30 EET)

Cyprus	1–0	Gibraltar
Roles 62'	Report

Ammochostos Stadium, Larnaca
Attendance: 240
Referee: Genc Nuza (Kosovo)

8 June 2019
13:00 (14:00 FET)

Belarus	10–0	Gibraltar
Shkurdyuk 31'; Bakhar 45+2', 75', 84'; Podstrelov 55'; Klenyo 68', 78', 90'; Alshanik 72'; Pyatrenka 80'	Report

Torpedo Stadium, Zhodzina
Attendance: 1,123
Referee: Yigal Frid (Israel)

5 September 2019
21:45 (20:45 WEST)

Portugal	4–0	Gibraltar
Trincão 8'; Mota 13', 60'; Queirós 66'	Report

Complexo Desportivo FC Alverca, Alverca do Ribatejo
Attendance: 4,783
Referee: Roomer Tarajev (Estonia)
6 September 2019
19:00

Norway	2–1	Cyprus
Heintz 19'; Thorstvedt 56'	Report	Polikarpou 74'

Marienlyst Stadion, Drammen
Attendance: 590
Referee: Furkat Atazhanov (Kazakhstan)

10 September 2019
19:00

Netherlands	5–1	Cyprus
Koopmeiners 16' (pen.); De Wit 26', 86'; Sierhuis 29'; Zeefuik 90'	Report	Sotiriou 11'

De Vijverberg, Doetinchem
Attendance: 5,500
Referee: Denys Shurman (Ukraine)
10 September 2019
19:00 (20:00 FET)

Belarus	0–2	Portugal
	Report	Leão 68'; Mota 90+4'

Torpedo Stadium, Zhodzina
Attendance: 1,370
Referee: Ioannis Papadopoulos (Greece)

11 October 2019
17:00 (18:00 FET)

Belarus	1–1	Norway
Grechikho 58'	Report	Bohinen 79'

Torpedo Stadium, Zhodzina
Attendance: 300
Referee: Enea Jorgji (Albania)
11 October 2019
18:30

Netherlands	4–2	Portugal
Boadu 8', 84'; Koopmeiners 50' (pen.); Stengs 90+4'	Report	Queirós 42'; Fernandes 64' (pen.)

De Vijverberg, Doetinchem
Attendance: 8,025
Referee: Roi Reinshreiber (Israel)

15 October 2019
14:30 (15:30 EEST)

Cyprus	1–1	Belarus
Shelis 37'	Report	Grechikho 68'

Ammochostos Stadium, Larnaca
Attendance: 149
Referee: Michal Ocenáš (Slovakia)
15 October 2019
18:30

Norway	0–4	Netherlands
	Report	Van Drongelen 30', 90+5'; Stengs 47'; De Wit 67'

Marienlyst Stadion, Drammen
Attendance: 1,100
Referee: Marco Di Bello (Italy)

14 November 2019
19:00

Gibraltar	0–6	Netherlands
	Report	Gakpo 16', 63'; De Wit 38', 66', 76'; Redan 88'

Victoria Stadium, Gibraltar
Attendance: 720
Referee: Emmanouil Skoulas (Greece)
15 November 2019
13:30 (14:30 EET)

Cyprus	1–2	Norway
Neophytou 20'	Report	Thorstvedt 72', 85'

Ammochostos Stadium, Larnaca
Attendance: 200
Referee: Suren Baliyan (Armenia)

19 November 2019
18:30

Norway	2–3	Portugal
Thorstvedt 83' (pen.); Larsen 90'	Report	Vieira 2', 78'; Jota 20'

Marienlyst Stadion, Drammen
Attendance: 505
Referee: Sergei Lapochkin (Russia)
19 November 2019
20:00

Gibraltar	0–2	Belarus
	Report	Sedko 25' (pen.); Shkurin 59'

Victoria Stadium, Gibraltar
Attendance: 720
Referee: Bram Van Driessche (Belgium)

4 September 2020
18:00

Norway	6–0	Gibraltar
Hauge 14' (pen.); Risa 23', 79'; Larsen 70' (pen.), 80', 90+1' (pen.)	Report

Marienlyst Stadion, Drammen
Attendance: 0 (Note: Due to the COVID-19 pandemic in Europe, all matches scheduled for September 2020 were played behind closed doors.)
Referee: Oskari Hämäläinen (Finland)
4 September 2020
18:00 (19:00 EEST)

Cyprus	0–4	Portugal
	Report	Leite 8', 28'; Jota 54'; João Mário 86'

AEK Arena – Georgios Karapatakis, Larnaca
Attendance: 0
Referee: Urs Schnyder (Switzerland)
4 September 2020
18:00 (19:00 FET)

Belarus	0–7	Netherlands
	Report	Boadu 3', 34'; Koopmeiners 9' (pen.); De Wit 55', 68'; Sierhuis 82'; Harroui 90+1'

Torpedo Stadium, Zhodzina
Attendance: 0
Referee: Dumitru Muntean (Moldova)

8 September 2020
20:00

Netherlands	2–0	Norway
Lang 83'; Boadu 90+3'	Report

Yanmar Stadion, Almere
Attendance: 0
Referee: Karim Abed (France)

8 October 2020
20:00

Netherlands	5–0	Gibraltar
De Wit 7', 24'; Kadioglu 39'; Zeefuik 70'; Ekkelenkamp 78'	Report

De Koel, Venlo
Attendance: 0
Referee: Christopher Jaeger (Austria)
9 October 2020
17:00 (18:00 FET)

Belarus	1–2	Cyprus
Davyskiba 87' (pen.)	Report	Sotiriou 7'; Peratikos 48'

Torpedo Stadium, Zhodzina
Attendance: 105
Referee: Tihomir Pejin (Croatia)
9 October 2020
20:30 (19:30 WEST)

Portugal	4–1	Norway
Neto 6', 16'; Ferreira 69'; Mota 88'	Report	Larsen 34'

Estádio António Coimbra da Mota, Estoril
Attendance: 0
Referee: Vilhjalmur Thorarinsson (Iceland)

13 October 2020
18:00 (19:00 EEST)

Cyprus	0–7	Netherlands
	Report	Gravenberch 22'; Ekkelenkamp 50', 65'; Sierhuis 51', 73', 90' (pen.); Boadu 82'

AEK Arena – Georgios Karapatakis, Larnaca
Attendance: 0
Referee: Eldorjan Hamiti (Albania)
13 October 2020
19:00

Gibraltar	0–3	Portugal
	Report	Jota 16'; Pote 50', 80'

Victoria Stadium, Gibraltar
Attendance: 0
Referee: Fyodor Zammit (Malta)

12 November 2020 (Note: The match between Portugal and Belarus was originally scheduled on 8 September 2020, 17:30 WEST, at Cidade do Futebol, Oeiras, but was postponed due to several players of the Belarus team testing positive for the COVID-19 virus. It was rescheduled to 12 November 2020.)
20:30 (19:30 WET)

Portugal	3–0	Belarus
Prischepa 3' (o.g.); Vieira 19' (pen.); Ramos 90' (pen.)	Report

Estádio Municipal de Portimão, Portimão
Attendance: 0
Referee: Fedayi San (Switzerland)
13 November 2020 (Note: All matches originally scheduled to be played in March 2020 were postponed due to the COVID-19 pandemic in Europe. These matches were subsequently rescheduled to be played in November 2020.)
19:00

Gibraltar	Cancelled (Note: The match between Gibraltar and Norway, originally scheduled to be played on 13 November 2020, was cancelled due to tighter restrictions related to the COVID-19 pandemic announced by the Norwegian government. The matches between Norway and Belarus and between Gibraltar and Cyprus, originally scheduled to be played on 18 November 2020, were also cancelled, as none of these three matches had any impact on which team would qualify for the final tournament.)	Norway
	Report

Victoria Stadium, Gibraltar

15 November 2020
14:30

Netherlands	5–0	Belarus
Sierhuis 30', 64', 83'; Boadu 31', 47'	Report

Yanmar Stadion, Almere
Attendance: 0
Referee: Jens Maae (Denmark)
15 November 2020
20:30 (19:30 WET)

Portugal	2–1	Cyprus
Fernandes 45+1' (pen.); Queirós 68'	Report	Artymatas 2'

Estádio Municipal da Bela Vista, Parchal
Attendance: 0
Referee: Barbeno Luca (San Marino)

18 November 2020 (Note: The match between Norway and Belarus was originally scheduled on 13 October 2020, 19:00 CET, at Marienlyst Stadion, Drammen, but was postponed due to several players of the Belarus team testing positive for the COVID-19 virus. It was rescheduled to 18 November 2020, before it was cancelled.)

Norway	Cancelled	Belarus
	Report

Marienlyst Stadion, Drammen
18 November 2020
19:00

Gibraltar	Cancelled	Cyprus
	Report

Victoria Stadium, Gibraltar
18 November 2020
20:30 (19:30 WET)

Portugal	2–1	Netherlands
Vieira 2', 53'	Report	Gakpo 42'

Estádio Municipal de Portimão, Portimão
Attendance: 0
Referee: Nicholas Walsh (Scotland)

== Goalscorers ==
There were 112 goals scored in 27 matches, for an average of 4.15 goals per match.

10 goals

- (Netherlands) Dani de Wit

8 goals

- (Netherlands) Myron Boadu
- (Netherlands) Kaj Sierhuis

5 goals

- (Norway) Jørgen Strand Larsen
- (Portugal) Fábio Vieira

4 goals

- (Norway) Kristian Thorstvedt
- (Portugal) Dany Mota

3 goals

- (Belarus) Ivan Bakhar
- (Belarus) Pavel Klenyo
- (Netherlands) Jurgen Ekkelenkamp
- (Netherlands) Cody Gakpo
- (Netherlands) Teun Koopmeiners
- (Portugal) Jota
- (Portugal) Diogo Queirós

2 goals

- (Belarus) Denis Grechikho
- (Cyprus) Ruel Sotiriou
- (Netherlands) Rick van Drongelen
- (Netherlands) Calvin Stengs
- (Netherlands) Deyovaisio Zeefuik
- (Norway) Birk Risa
- (Portugal) Gedson Fernandes
- (Portugal) Diogo Leite
- (Portugal) Pedro Neto
- (Portugal) Pote

1 goal

- (Belarus) Andrey Alshanik
- (Belarus) Roman Davyskiba
- (Belarus) Dmitry Podstrelov
- (Belarus) Artsyom Pyatrenka
- (Belarus) Pavel Sedko
- (Belarus) Artem Shkurdyuk
- (Belarus) Ilya Shkurin
- (Cyprus) Panayiotis Artymatas
- (Cyprus) Andreas Neophytou
- (Cyprus) Marios Peratikos
- (Cyprus) Paris Polikarpou
- (Cyprus) Jack Roles
- (Cyprus) Christos Shelis
- (Netherlands) Ryan Gravenberch
- (Netherlands) Abdou Harroui
- (Netherlands) Ferdi Kadioglu
- (Netherlands) Noa Lang
- (Netherlands) Daishawn Redan
- (Norway) Emil Bohinen
- (Norway) Jens Petter Hauge
- (Norway) Tobias Heintz
- (Portugal) Vítor Ferreira
- (Portugal) João Mário
- (Portugal) Rafael Leão
- (Portugal) Gonçalo Ramos
- (Portugal) Francisco Trincão

1 own goal

- (Belarus) Dmitri Prischepa (against Portugal)
