= 2023–24 AC Monza season =

Monza
2023–24 season
- Owner: Fininvest S.p.A.
- Honorary chairman: Paolo Berlusconi
- Head coach: Raffaele Palladino
- Stadium: Stadio Brianteo
- Serie A: 12th
- Coppa Italia: Round of 64
- Top goalscorer: League: Andrea Colpani (8); All: Andrea Colpani (8)
- Highest home attendance: 15,148
- Lowest home attendance: 8,155
- Average home league attendance: 12,124
- Biggest win: Monza 3–0 Salernitana (8 October 2023)
- Biggest defeat: Monza 1–5 Inter Milan (13 January 2024)
Home colours	Away colours	Third colours

The 2023–24 season was Associazione Calcio Monza's second season in the Serie A, the first level of Italian football, following their promotion in the 2021–22 season. They also competed in the Coppa Italia.

== Pre-season and friendlies ==
Monza played four pre-season friendly games in July 2023, as part of a training camp in Ponte di Legno; all games were played in Temù. On 1 August, they played a friendly game away to Premier League side Everton, which finished 2–2.

On 8 August 2023, Monza and AC Milan played the first edition of the Trofeo Silvio Berlusconi (previously known as the Trofeo Luigi Berlusconi), a yearly friendly game in honour of Monza president and former Milan president Silvio Berlusconi who had died in June 2023. The stadium in which the game is held will alternate annually between Monza's and Milan's home stadium. Milan won the first edition, beating Monza in a penalty shoot-out after a 1–1 draw.

Results list Monza's goal tally first.

Date	Opponent	Venue	Result	Monza scorers
15 July 2023	Nuova Camunia	Neutral	11–0	Birindelli, Izzo, Colpani, Pessina, Marić (4), Ciurria (2), Machín
19 July 2023	Real Vicenza	Neutral	5–0	Izzo 8', Marić 43', Caprari (2) 80' (pen.), 90', Birindelli 86'
22 July 2023	Giana Erminio	Neutral	5–1	Machín (2) 8', 87', V. Carboni 45+2', F. Carboni 57', Petagna 69'
23 July 2023	Vis Pesaro	Neutral	3–0	Marić 2' (pen.), Caprari 20', A. Carboni 38'
1 August 2023	Everton	Away	2–2	Colpani 52', Mota 78'
8 August 2023	AC Milan	Home	1–1 (5–6 p)	Colpani 32'

== Serie A ==
=== Matches ===
Results list Monza's goal tally first.

Date	Opponent	Venue	Result	Monza scorers	Attendance	Position
19 August 2023	Inter Milan	Away	0–2		72,509	17th
26 August 2023	Empoli	Home	2–0	Colpani 45', 53'	8,155	9th
2 September 2023	Atalanta	Away	0–3		14,985	15th
17 September 2023	Lecce	Home	1–1	Colpani 24'	13,074	14th
23 September 2023	Lazio	Away	1–1	Gagliardini 36'	36,000	14th
28 September 2023	Bologna	Home	0–0		8,930	15th
2 October 2023	Sassuolo	Away	1–0	Colombo 66'	10,165	12th
8 October 2023	Salernitana	Home	3–0	Colpani 9', Vignato 18', Pessina 82' (pen.)	12,494	7th
22 October 2023	Roma	Away	0–1		62,022	11th
29 October 2023	Udinese	Home	1–1	Colpani 29'	10,311	10th
5 November 2023	Hellas Verona	Away	3–1	Colombo 41', 73', Caldirola 84'	17,505	9th
11 November 2023	Torino	Home	1–1	Colpani 65'	11,777	9th
26 November 2023	Cagliari	Away	1–1	Marić 61'	16,291	9th
1 December 2023	Juventus	Home	1–2	Carboni 90+2'	15,148	11th
10 December 2023	Genoa	Home	1–0	Mota 83'	13,283	9th
17 December 2023	AC Milan	Away	0–3		70,538	10th
22 December 2023	Fiorentina	Home	0–1		10,120	11th
29 December 2023	Napoli	Away	0–0		50,636	11th
6 January 2024	Frosinone	Away	3–2	Mota 18', Carboni 45', Soulé 55' (o.g.)	13,146	11th
13 January 2024	Inter Milan	Home	1–5	Pessina 69' (pen.)	14,670	11th
21 January 2024	Empoli	Away	0–3		7,650	12th
28 January 2024	Sassuolo	Home	1–0	Colpani 31'	9,882	12th
3 February 2024	Udinese	Away	0–0		11,373	12th
11 February 2024	Hellas Verona	Home	0–0		10,885	11th
18 February 2024	AC Milan	Home	4–2	Pessina 45+6' (pen.), Mota 51', Bondo 90', Colombo 90+5'	14,319	11th
24 February 2024	Salernitana	Away	2–0	Maldini 78', Pessina 83'	18,560	11th
2 March 2024	Roma	Home	1–4	Carboni 87'	14,188	11th
9 March 2024	Genoa	Away	3–2	Pessina 8', Mota 18', Maldini 79'	31,171	10th
16 March 2024	Cagliari	Home	1–0	Maldini 42'	14,145	10th
30 March 2024	Torino	Away	0–1		24,286	11th
7 April 2024	Napoli	Home	2–4	Đurić 9', Colpani 62'	13,169	11th
13 April 2024	Bologna	Away	0–0		26,903	11th
21 April 2024	Atalanta	Home	1–2	Maldini 89'	13,983	11th
27 April 2024	Lecce	Away	1–1	Pessina 90+6' (pen.)	27,167	11th
4 May 2024	Lazio	Home	2–2	Đurić 73', 90+2'	10,454	11th
13 May 2024	Fiorentina	Away	1–2	Đurić 9'	24,376	12th
19 May 2024	Frosinone	Home	0–1		12,306	12th
25 May 2024	Juventus	Away	0–2		38,165	12th

=== League table ===
Pos	Team	Pld	W	D	L	GF	GA	GD	Pts
10	Napoli	38	13	14	11	55	48	+7	53 (Note: Torino finished ahead of Napoli on head-to-head points: Torino 3–0 Napoli, Napoli 1–1 Torino.)
11	Genoa	38	12	13	13	45	45	0	49
12	Monza	38	11	12	15	39	51	−12	45
13	Hellas Verona	38	9	11	18	38	51	−13	38 (Note: Hellas Verona finished ahead of Lecce on head-to-head points: Hellas Verona 2–2 Lecce, Lecce 0–1 Hellas Verona.)
14	Lecce	38	8	14	16	32	54	−22	38

Source: Serie A
Rules for classification: 1) Points; 2) Tiebreaker for Champions team and third relegated team; 3) Head-to-head points; 4) Head-to-head goal difference; 5) Goal difference; 6) Goals scored; 7) Draw.
(Note: Head-to-head record is used only after all the matches between the teams in question have been played)

== Coppa Italia ==
Results list Monza's goal tally first.

Date	Round	Opponent	Venue	Result	Scorers	Attendance
13 August 2023	Round of 64	Reggiana	Home	1–2	D'Ambrosio 22'	8,178

== Player details ==
As of match played 25 May 2024

No.	Pos	Nat	Player	Total		Serie A		Coppa Italia	
No.	Pos	Nat	Player	Apps	Goals	Apps	Goals	Apps	Goals
1	GK	(Italy) ITA	Eugenio Lamanna	0	0	0	0	0	0
2	DF	(Italy) ITA	Giulio Donati	4	0	4	0	0	0
4	DF	(Italy) ITA	Armando Izzo	23	0	22	0	1	0
5	DF	(Italy) ITA	Luca Caldirola	30	1	29	1	1	0
6	MF	(Italy) ITA	Roberto Gagliardini	34	1	33	1	1	0
7	MF	(Equatorial Guinea) GEQ	José Machín	10	0	10	0	0	0
8	MF	(Ivory Coast) CIV	Jean-Daniel Akpa Akpro	19	0	19	0	0	0
9	FW	(Italy) ITA	Lorenzo Colombo	25	4	25	4	0	0
10	FW	(Italy) ITA	Gianluca Caprari	7	0	6	0	1	0
11	FW	(Bosnia and Herzegovina) BIH	Milan Đurić	17	4	17	4	0	0
11	MF	(Argentina) ARG	Franco Carboni	1	0	0	0	1	0
13	DF	(Portugal) POR	Pedro Pereira	23	0	23	0	0	0
16	GK	(Italy) ITA	Michele Di Gregorio	34	0	33	0	1	0
17	MF	(Argentina) ARG	Alejandro Gómez	2	0	2	0	0	0
18	DF	(Italy) ITA	Davide Bettella	1	0	1	0	0	0
19	DF	(Italy) ITA	Samuele Birindelli	34	0	34	0	0	0
20	FW	(Italy) ITA	Alessio Zerbin	13	0	13	0	0	0
21	MF	(Argentina) ARG	Valentín Carboni	33	2	31	2	2	0
22	DF	(Spain) ESP	Pablo Marí	35	0	34	0	1	0
23	GK	(Italy) ITA	Alessandro Sorrentino	7	0	7	0	0	0
24	FW	(Croatia) CRO	Mirko Marić	11	1	10	1	1	0
27	FW	(Italy) ITA	Daniel Maldini	11	4	11	4	0	0
28	MF	(Italy) ITA	Andrea Colpani	39	8	38	8	1	0
32	MF	(Italy) ITA	Matteo Pessina	38	6	37	6	1	0
33	DF	(Italy) ITA	Danilo D'Ambrosio	29	1	24	0	5	1
38	MF	(France) FRA	Warren Bondo	25	1	25	1	0	0
44	DF	(Italy) ITA	Andrea Carboni	22	1	21	1	1	0
46	DF	(Italy) ITA	Giorgio Cittadini	1	0	1	0	0	0
47	FW	(Portugal) POR	Dany Mota	35	4	34	4	1	0
61	FW	(Italy) ITA	Andrea Ferraris	1	0	1	0	0	0
66	GK	(Italy) ITA	Stefano Gori	0	0	0	0	0	0
77	DF	(Greece) GRE	Giorgos Kyriakopoulos	29	0	28	0	1	0
79	FW	(Serbia) SRB	Matija Popović	0	0	0	0	0	0
80	MF	(Italy) ITA	Samuele Vignato	11	1	10	1	1	0
84	FW	(Italy) ITA	Patrick Ciurria	23	0	22	0	1	0

== Transfers ==
=== Summer ===
Arrivals
Date	Pos.	Player	From	Type	Fee	Ref.
4 July 2023	DF	(Italy) Giorgio Cittadini	Atalanta	Loan	Undisclosed	
7 July 2023	MF	(Italy) Roberto Gagliardini	Inter Milan	Free transfer		
15 July 2023	MF	(Argentina) Valentín Carboni	Inter Milan	Loan	Undisclosed	
28 July 2023	DF	(Greece) Giorgos Kyriakopoulos	Sassuolo	Loan	Undisclosed	
31 July 2023	GK	(Italy) Stefano Gori	Juventus	Loan	Undisclosed	
2 August 2023	DF	(Italy) Danilo D'Ambrosio	Inter Milan	Free transfer		
26 August 2023	MF	(Ivory Coast) Jean-Daniel Akpa Akpro	Lazio	Loan	Undisclosed	
1 September 2023	FW	(Italy) Lorenzo Colombo	AC Milan	Loan	Undisclosed	
29 September 2023	MW	(Argentina) Papu Gómez	(Spain) Sevilla	Free transfer		
Other transfers (Note: Players part of the previous season's first-team squad, or who were not included in this season's first-team squad.): Date / Pos. / Player / From / Type / Fee / Ref.; 1 July 2023 / GK / (Italy) Alessio Cragno / Cagliari / Loan redemption / €3.6 million; 1 July 2023 / DF / (Spain) Pablo Marí / (England) Arsenal / Loan redemption / €4.9 million; 1 July 2023 / MF / (Italy) Matteo Pessina / Atalanta / Loan redemption / €12 million; 1 July 2023 / FW / (Italy) Gianluca Caprari / Hellas Verona / Loan redemption / €7.5 million; 1 July 2023 / FW / (Italy) Andrea Petagna / Napoli / Loan redemption / €10 million; 1 July 2023 / GK / (Italy) Stefano Rubbi / Pergolettese / Return from loan / N/A; 1 July 2023 / DF / (Italy) Armando Anastasio / Pro Vercelli / Return from loan / N/A; 1 July 2023 / DF / (Italy) Davide Bettella / Palermo / Return from loan / N/A; 1 July 2023 / DF / (Italy) Andrea Carboni / Venezia / Return from loan / N/A; 1 July 2023 / DF / (Portugal) Pedro Pereira / (Turkey) Alanyaspor / Return from loan / N/A; 1 July 2023 / DF / (Italy) Mario Sampirisi / Frosinone / Return from loan / N/A; 1 July 2023 / MF / (France) Warren Bondo / Reggina / Return from loan / N/A; 1 July 2023 / MF / (Italy) Luca Mazzitelli / Frosinone / Return from loan / N/A; 1 July 2023 / MF / (Italy) Tommaso Morosini / Sangiuliano City / Return from loan / N/A; 1 July 2023 / FW / (Italy) Davide Diaw / Modena / Return from loan / N/A; 1 July 2023 / FW / (Italy) Leonardo Mancuso / Como / Return from loan / N/A; 5 July 2023 / DF / (Italy) Armando Izzo / Torino / Permanent / Undisclosed

Departures
Date	Pos.	Player	To	Type	Fee	Ref.
1 July 2023	DF	(Italy) Giulio Donati	Released			
1 July 2023	DF	(Italy) Luca Marrone	Released			
1 July 2023	MF	(Italy) Andrea Barberis	Released			
1 July 2023	FW	(Denmark) Christian Gytkjær	Released			
1 July 2023	DF	(Brazil) Marlon	(Ukraine) Shakhtar Donetsk	Return from loan		
1 July 2023	MF	(Italy) Filippo Ranocchia	Juventus	Return from loan		
1 July 2023	MF	(Italy) Nicolò Rovella	Juventus	Return from loan		
1 July 2023	MF	(Italy) Stefano Sensi	Inter Milan	Return from loan		
15 July 2023	GK	(Italy) Alessio Cragno	Sassuolo	Loan	Undisclosed	
7 August 2023	MF	(Italy) Marco D'Alessandro	Pisa	Loan	Undisclosed	
15 August 2023	FW	(Brazil) Carlos Augusto	Inter Milan	Loan	Undisclosed	
23 August 2023	MF	(Italy) Mattia Valoti	Pisa	Loan	Undisclosed	
27 August 2023	DF	(Italy) Mario Sampirisi	Reggiana	Permanent	Undisclosed	
30 August 2023	FW	(Italy) Andrea Petagna	Cagliari	Loan	Undisclosed	
31 August 2023	DF	(Bulgaria) Valentin Antov	Cremonese	Loan	Undisclosed	
6 September 2023	DF	(Italy) Armando Anastasio	Casertana	Loan	Undisclosed	
Other transfers (Note: Players not part of the previous season's first-team squad, or who were included in this season's first-team squad.): Date / Pos. / Player / To / Type / Fee / Ref.; 1 July 2023 / GK / (Italy) Alessio Cragno / Cagliari / Return from loan; 1 July 2023 / DF / (Italy) Armando Izzo / Torino / Return from loan; 1 July 2023 / DF / (Spain) Pablo Marí / (England) Arsenal / Return from loan; 1 July 2023 / MF / (Italy) Matteo Pessina / Atalanta / Return from loan; 1 July 2023 / FW / (Italy) Gianluca Caprari / Hellas Verona / Return from loan; 1 July 2023 / FW / (Italy) Andrea Petagna / Napoli / Return from loan; 1 July 2023 / MF / (Italy) Luca Mazzitelli / Frosinone / Loan redemption / Undisclosed; 4 July 2023 / MF / (Italy) Tommaso Morosini / Released; 5 July 2023 / FW / (Italy) Leonardo Mancuso / Palermo / Loan / Undisclosed; 15 August 2023 / FW / (Italy) Davide Diaw / Bari / Loan / Undisclosed

=== Winter window ===
Arrivals
Date	Pos.	Player	From	Type	Fee	Ref.
10 January 2024	FW	(Italy) Daniel Maldini	AC Milan	Loan		
25 January 2024	FW	(Italy) Alessio Zerbin	Napoli	Loan		
25 January 2024	FW	(Serbia) Matija Popović				
26 January 2024	FW	(Bosnia and Herzegovina) Milan Đurić	Verona	Permanent		

Departures
Date	Pos.	Player	To	Type	Fee	Ref.
9 January 2024	MF	(Argentina) Franco Carboni	Ternana	Loan		
26 January 2024	DF	(Italy) Giorgio Cittadini	Genoa	Loan		
31 January 2024	FW	(Croatia) Mirko Marić	Rijeka	Loan		
31 January 2024	GK	(Italy) Eugenio Lamanna	Lecco	Permanent		
