= Luca Lombardi =

Luca Lombardi may refer to:

- Luca Lombardi (composer) (born 1945), Italian composer
- Luca Lombardi (footballer) (born 2002), Italian footballer
