= Andrea Colpani =

Italian footballer (born 1999)

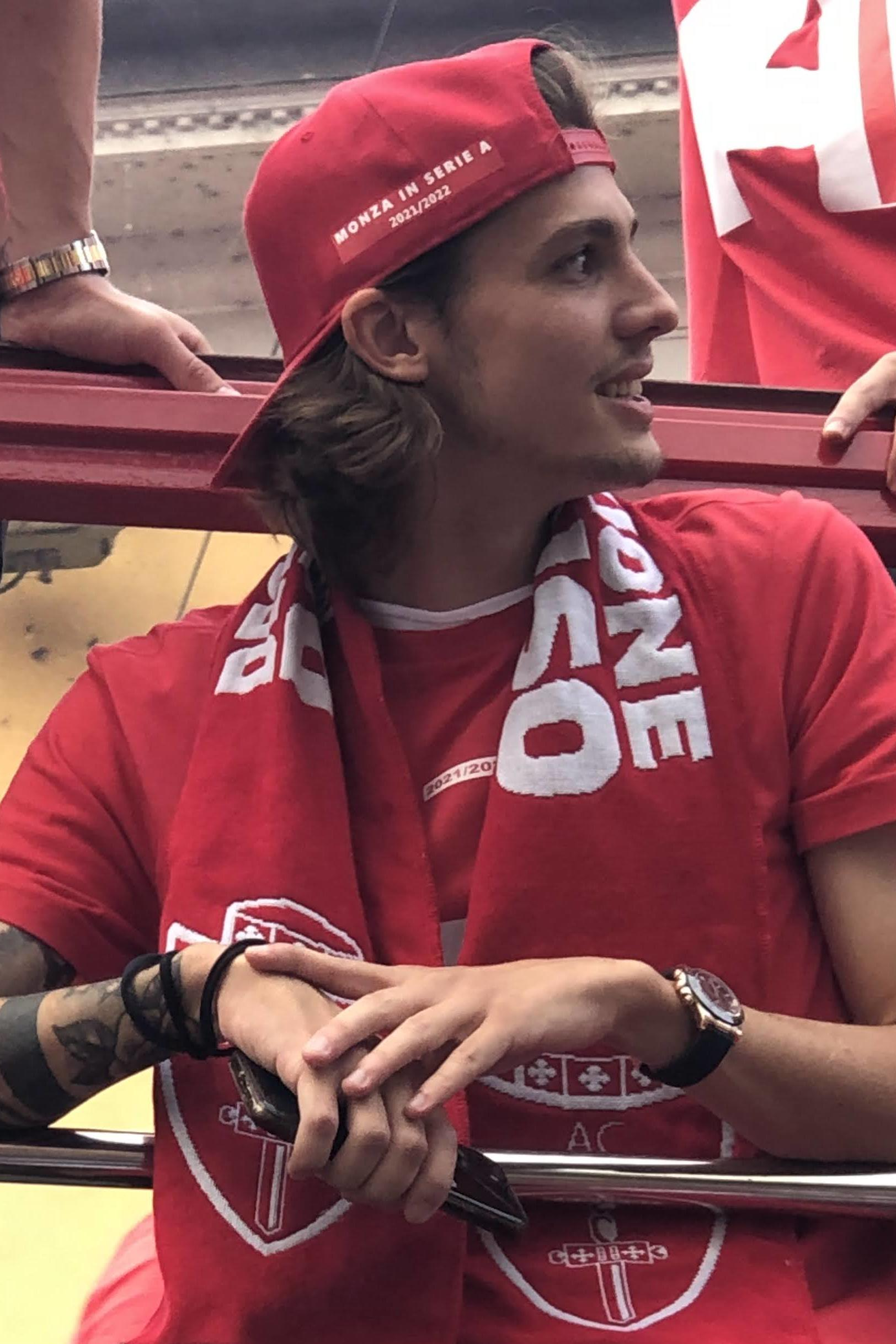
- Colpani with Monza in 2022

Personal information
- Full name: Andrea Colpani
- Date of birth: 11 May 1999 (age 27)
- Place of birth: Brescia, Italy
- Height: 1.84 m (6 ft 0 in)
- Positions: Midfielder; right winger

Team information
- Current team: Monza
- Number: 28

Youth career
- –2019: Atalanta

Senior career*
Years	Team	Apps	(Gls)
2018–2022	Atalanta	0	(0)
2019–2020	→ Trapani (loan)	34	(0)
2020–2022	→ Monza (loan)	56	(6)
2022–	Monza	90	(14)
2024–2025	→ Fiorentina (loan)	26	(2)

International career^{‡}
2018–2019	Italy U20	13	(0)
2020	Italy U21	3	(1)
- * Club domestic league appearances and goals as of 12 May 2026 ‡ National team caps and goals as of 19:45, 18 November 2020 (UTC)

Andrea Colpani (born 11 May 1999) is an Italian professional footballer who plays as a midfielder or right winger for Serie A club Monza.

== Club career ==
=== Atalanta ===
Colpani is a product of the Atalanta Youth Sector, and started playing for their under-19 squad in the 2016–17 season.

In the 2017–18 and 2018–19, he was called up to the senior squad on several occasions, including the 2019 Coppa Italia Final, but did not make any appearances.

==== Loan to Trapani ====
On 17 July 2019, Colpani was loaned to newly-promoted Serie B club Trapani on a season-long loan. He made his professional Serie B debut for Trapani, on 24 August 2019, against Ascoli. He started the game and played the first 63 minutes. Colpani played 34 league games for Trapani, as well as two games in Coppa Italia.

=== Monza ===
On 22 August 2020, Colpani was loaned to newly-promoted Serie B side Monza for a two-year period, with an option and conditional obligation to purchase. He scored his first goal on 16 March 2021, as a substitute in a 2–0 home win over Reggiana. On 1 November 2021, Colpani scored his first goal of the 2021–22 season, helping Monza beat Alessandria 1–0. Following Monza's Serie A promotion on 29 May 2022, Colpani's obligation for purchase clause was triggered.

Colpani made his Serie A debut during the 2022–23 season on 21 August, coming on as a substitute in a 4–0 defeat away to Napoli in the second matchday. He scored his first Serie A goal on 26 August, in a 2–1 home defeat to Udinese. On 10 August 2023, Monza renewed Colpani's contract until 30 June 2028.

On 26 August 2023, Colpani scored his first brace in a 2–0 Serie A win against Empoli. He left the club with 133 games and 18 goals in all competitions.

==== Loan to Fiorentina ====
On 26 July 2024, Colpani joined fellow-Serie A side Fiorentina on a one-year loan with an option for purchase.

== International career ==
Colpani was selected for Italy's 2019 FIFA U-20 World Cup squad, and made four appearances at the tournament—three as a substitute—as Italy finished in fourth place. Colpani played 16 games between 2018 and 2019 for the under-20 team. On 3 September 2020, Colpani scored a free kick for Italy U21 on his debut, in a friendly against Slovenia.

Colpani was called up to the senior Italy squad for UEFA Euro 2024 qualifying matches against North Macedonia and Ukraine on 17 and 20 November 2023, respectively.

== Style of play ==
Due to his similarities with Javier Pastore, Colpani is sometimes nicknamed "El Flaco".

== Career statistics ==
As of match played 18 May 2025

Appearances and goals by club, season and competition
Club	Season	League			Coppa Italia		Other		Total	
Club	Season	Division	Apps	Goals	Apps	Goals	Apps	Goals	Apps	Goals
Atalanta	2017–18	Serie A	0	0	0	0	—		0	0
Atalanta	2018–19	Serie A	0	0	0	0	—		0	0
Atalanta	2019–20	Serie A	—		—		—		0	0
Atalanta	2020–21	Serie A	—		—		—		0	0
Atalanta	2021–22	Serie A	—		—		—		0	0
Atalanta	Total		0	0	0	0	0	0	0	0
Trapani (loan)	2019–20	Serie B	34	0	2	0	—		36	4
Monza (loan)	2020–21	Serie B	23	1	2	0	2 (Note: Appearances in Serie A promotion play-offs)	0	27	1
Monza (loan)	2021–22	Serie B	33	5	1	0	3	0	37	5
Monza (loan)	Total		56	6	3	0	5	0	64	6
Monza	2022–23	Serie A	27	4	3	0	—		30	4
Monza	2023–24	Serie A	38	8	1	0	—		39	8
Monza	Total		65	12	4	0	0	0	69	12
Fiorentina (loan)	2024–25	Serie A	26	2	1	0	6 (Note: Appearances in UEFA Conference League)	0	33	2
Career total			181	20	10	0	11	0	202	20
