= Matija Popović (footballer) =

Serbian footballer (born 2006)

Matija Popović Матија Поповић
Personal information
- Date of birth: 8 January 2006 (age 20)
- Place of birth: Altötting, Germany
- Height: 1.93 m (6 ft 4 in)
- Positions: Attacking midfielder; winger; forward

Team information
- Current team: CSKA Moscow
- Number: 20

Youth career
- 2018–2019: Vojvodina
- 2021–2024: Partizan
- 2024: → Monza (loan)
- 2024–2025: Napoli

Senior career*
Years	Team	Apps	(Gls)
2024	Partizan	0	(0)
2024	→ Monza (loan)	0	(0)
2025–	CSKA Moscow	20	(1)

International career^{‡}
2022–2023	Serbia U17	10	(1)
2024–	Serbia U19	10	(2)
2026–	Serbia U21	2	(0)
- * Club domestic league appearances and goals as of 25 October 2026 ‡ National team caps and goals as of 17 November 2026

Matija Popović (Serbian Cyrillic: Матија Поповић; born 8 January 2006) is a professional footballer who plays as an attacking midfielder, winger, and forward for Russian Premier League club CSKA Moscow. Born in Germany, he is a youth international for Serbia.

== Club career ==
=== Early career ===
On 11 October 2023, Popović was named by British newspaper The Guardian as one of the 60 best players born in 2006 worldwide.

On 25 January 2024, he joined Serie A side Monza on a six-months loan for the second half of the 2023–24 season. As part of the deal, he was reportedly set to permanently join fellow Serie A club Napoli from 1 July of the same year, ahead of the 2024–25 season. He appeared on the bench for Monza's senior squad in several games. After the transfer to Napoli, he played for their Under-20 squad.

=== CSKA Moscow ===
On 11 September 2025, Popović signed for Russian Premier League club CSKA Moscow in the last days of the summer transfer window. He signed a three-year deal with them on a free transfer, with Napoli retaining a 10% sell-on clause.

He made his RPL debut for CSKA on 18 October 2025 in a game against Lokomotiv Moscow. In his second league appearance on 8 November 2025, he assisted on a winning goal by Kirill Glebov in a 1–0 victory over Dynamo Makhachkala. On 26 November 2025, in the second leg of the RPL path quarterfinal of the 2025–26 Russian Cup against Dynamo Makhachkala, Popović scored his first goal for CSKA in the last minute of the game, giving CSKA 2–1 victory and equalizing the aggregate score. He then converted his penalty kick in the subsequent penalty shoot-out that CSKA won.

Popović scored his first league goal for CSKA on 1 August 2026 against Krylia Sovetov Samara.

== Career statistics ==
As of 25 October 2026

Club	Season	League			Cup		Total	
Club	Season	Division	Apps	Goals	Apps	Goals	Apps	Goals
Monza (loan)	2023–24	Serie A	0	0	0	0	0	0
CSKA Moscow	2025–26	Russian Premier League	13	0	5	1	18	1
CSKA Moscow	2026–27	Russian Premier League	7	1	4	0	11	1
CSKA Moscow	Total		20	1	9	1	29	2
Career total			20	1	9	1	29	2
