= Antonis Siatounis =

Greek footballer (born 2002)

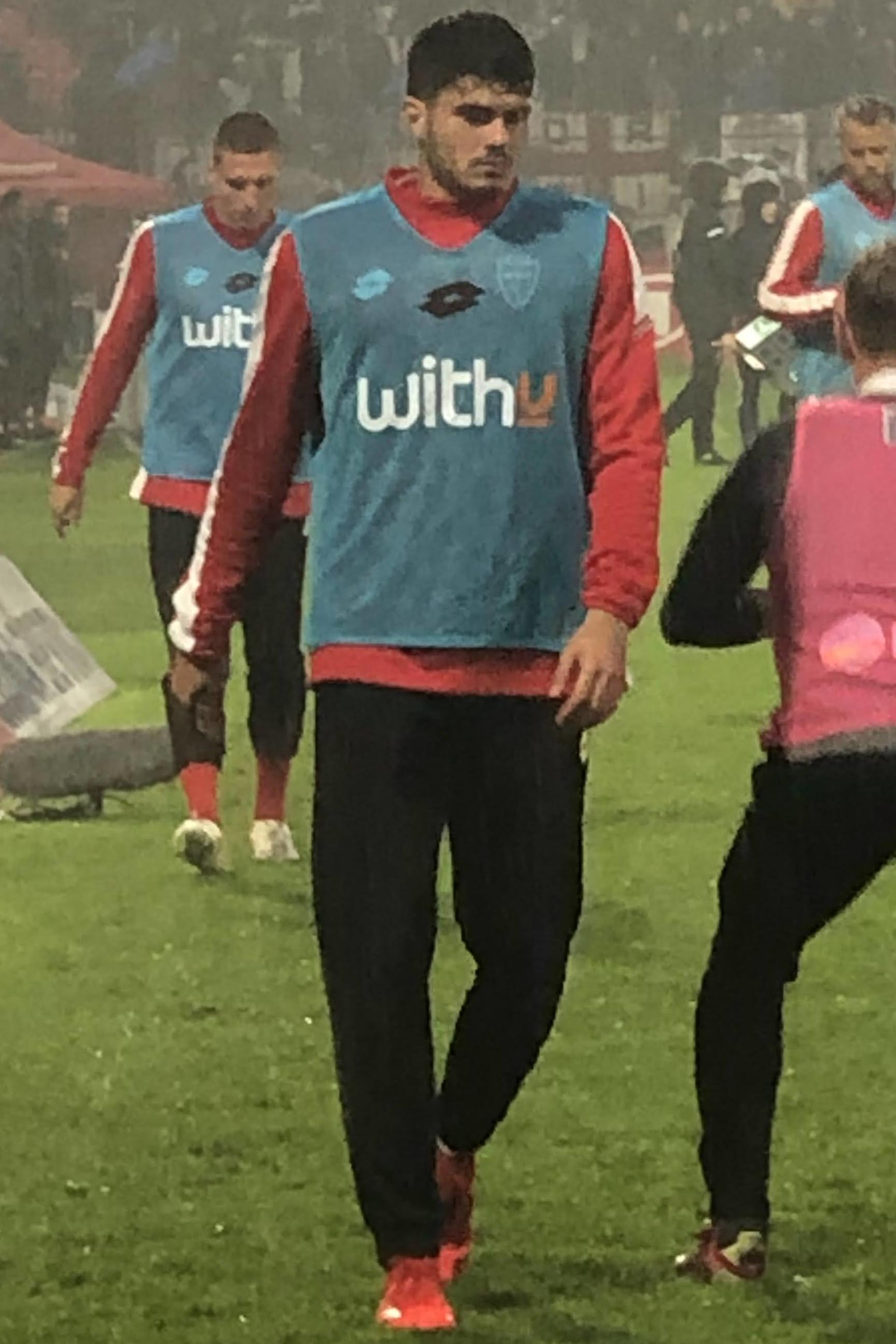
- Siatounis with Monza in 2021

Personal information
- Date of birth: 26 August 2002 (age 24)
- Place of birth: Ilion, Athens, Greece
- Height: 1.86 m (6 ft 1 in)
- Position: Midfielder

Team information
- Current team: Benevento

Youth career
- 2011–2018: Panathinaikos
- 2018–2021: Sampdoria

Senior career*
Years	Team	Apps	(Gls)
2021–2023	Monza	2	(0)
2023–2025	Virtus Entella	40	(0)
2025–2026	Potenza	50	(7)
2026–	Benevento	0	(0)

International career
2018–2019	Greece U17	9	(0)
- * Club domestic league appearances and goals as of 1 May 2026

Antonis Siatounis (Greek: Αντώνης Σιατούνης; born 26 August 2002) is a Greek professional footballer who plays as a midfielder for Serie B club Benevento.

== Club career ==
=== Youth career ===
Born in Ilion, a district in west Athens, Greece, Siatounis began his career at Panathinaikos' youth academy in 2011, staying there for eight years. In 2018 he moved to Italy, joining Sampdoria's under-17 team for a fee of €150,000. After playing with the under-18s, in the 2020–21 season Siatounis helped Sampdoria reach the semi-finals with the Primavera (under-19) team, scoring six goals and making seven assists.

=== Monza ===
Following the expiration of his contract with Sampdoria on 30 June 2021, Siatounis joined Serie B side Monza on a three-year contract. He made his unofficial debut on 15 July, as a substitute in a 14–0 friendly win against Real Vicenza. Siatounis scored five days later, in Monza's second pre-season friendly against Anaune Val di Non, which ended in a 5–0 win.

On 1 November, Siatounis made his official debut for Monza, coming on as a substitute against Alessandria in a 1–0 Serie B win.

=== Virtus Entella ===
On 2 January 2023, Siatounis joined Serie C club Virtus Entella, with Monza holding a buy-back clause.

== International career ==
Siatounis represented Greece at under-17 level between 2018 and 2019, helping his team qualify for the 2019 UEFA European Under-17 Championship, where he played three group-stage games.

== Style of play ==
A left-footed player, Siatounis transitioned from a winger, to a full-back, to a central midfielder during his youth career at Panathinaikos. While at Sampdoria, he played either as a midfielder (deep-lying playmaker or mezzala) or as a centre-back. At 1.83 m (6 ft 0 in) tall, he has a good technique, and is noted for his passing ability, helping build up from the back.

== Personal life ==
Siatounis is a fan of Greek club Panathinaikos, where his father had played.

== Career statistics ==
=== Club ===
As of match played 7 November 2021

Appearances and goals by club, season and competition
Club	Season	League			Coppa Italia		Other		Total	
Club	Season	Division	Apps	Goals	Apps	Goals	Apps	Goals	Apps	Goals
Monza	2021–22	Serie B	2	0	0	0	—		2	0
Monza	2022–23	Serie A	0	0	0	0	—		0	0
Monza	Total		2	0	0	0	0	0	2	0
Virtus Entella	2022–23	Serie C	0	0	—		—		0	0
Career total			2	0	0	0	0	0	2	0
