= Dany Mota =

Association football player (born 1998)

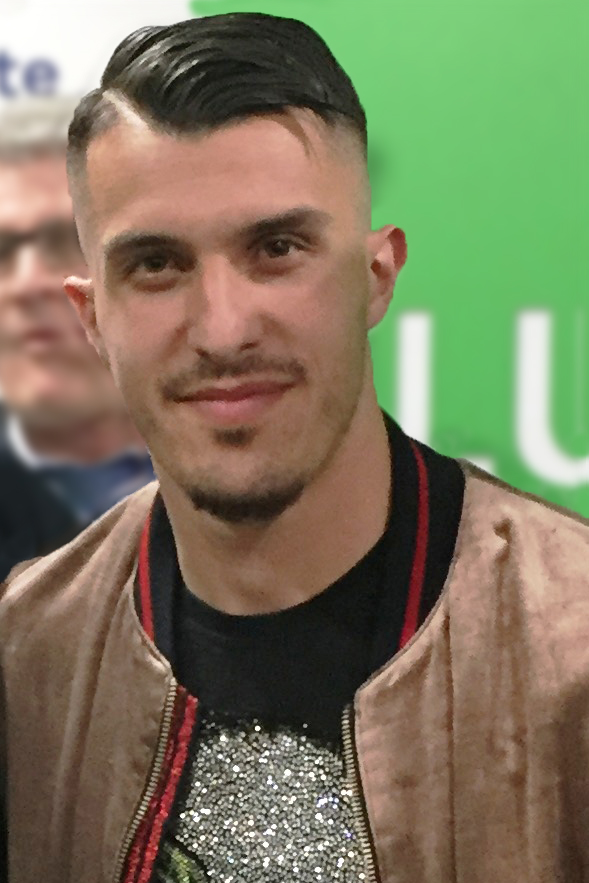
- Mota in 2020

Personal information
- Full name: Dany Mota Carvalho
- Date of birth: 2 May 1998 (age 28)
- Place of birth: Niederkorn, Luxembourg
- Height: 1.80 m (5 ft 11 in)
- Position: Forward

Team information
- Current team: Monza
- Number: 47

Youth career
- 2013–2016: CS Pétange
- 2015–2016: → Virtus Entella (loan)
- 2016–2018: Virtus Entella
- 2018: → Sassuolo (loan)

Senior career*
Years	Team	Apps	(Gls)
2014–2016	CS Pétange	14	(2)
2015–2016	→ Virtus Entella (loan)	2	(0)
2016–2019	Virtus Entella	44	(14)
2019–2020	Juventus	0	(0)
2019–2020	→ Juventus U23 (res.)	20	(7)
2020	→ Monza (loan)	6	(2)
2020–	Monza	195	(37)

International career
2019–2021	Portugal U21	16	(7)
Medal record
Men's football
Representing Portugal
UEFA European Under-21 Championship
Runner-up	2021	U-21 Team
- * Club domestic league appearances and goals as of 13:39, 6 June 2026 (UTC)

Dany Mota Carvalho (born 2 May 1998) is a Portuguese professional footballer who plays as a forward for Serie A club Monza.

Starting his senior career in Luxembourg at CS Pétange, Mota moved to Italy in 2014 to join Serie B club Virtus Entella. He spent four seasons at the club, having his breakthrough season in the 2018–19 Serie C where he scored 13 league goals. The following season Mota moved to Juventus U23, where he spent the first half of the season, before moving to Monza for the second half, helping them gain promotion to the Serie B.

Born in Luxembourg to Portuguese parents, Mota holds dual citizenship. He has represented the Portugal national under-21 team at the 2021 UEFA European Under-21 Championship, helping them finish runners-up.

== Early life ==
Born on 2 May 1998 in Niederkorn, Luxembourg to Portuguese immigrants, Mota holds both Luxembourgish and Portuguese nationality.

== Club career ==
=== Virtus Entella ===
On 17 September 2015, Serie B side Virtus Entella signed Mota. He made his professional debut on 14 May 2016, in a 2015–16 Serie B match against Avellino. Mota ended the season with two appearances. On 17 April 2017, Mota scored his first senior goal for Virtus Entella, in a 1–1 draw against Ternana. He scored one goal in six appearances during the 2016–17 season. The following season, Mota made three appearances in the league, and one in the Coppa Italia, without scoring.

Mota's breakthrough season for Virtus Entella came in the 2018–19 Serie C. After scoring his first Coppa Italia goal against Salernitana on 12 August 2018, Mota scored a brace the following game in the league against Gozzano, his first in his professional career, before scoring once again the next matchday against Pisa. Mota scored his second brace for Virtus Entella on 20 February 2019, against Pistoiese in the league in a 3–1 home win. The player ended the season with 13 goals in 35 appearances in the league, as well as one goal in four Coppa Italia appearances.

=== Juventus U23 ===
On 5 August 2019, Mota joined Juventus on a permanent transfer from Virtus Entella. The Serie A champions moved him to their reserve team playing in Serie C: Juventus U23.

Mota made his debut for Juventus U23 on 26 August 2019, in a 2–0 home win over Novara in the league. The following matchday, on 1 September 2019, Mota scored a brace against Siena; his team, however, lost the encounter 2–3. He scored four consecutive league goals, between 18 and 30 September 2019, against Arezzo, Pontedera, AlbinoLeffe, and Monza, his eventual future club. Mota scored seven league goals in 20 appearances in the first half of the 2019–20 season.

=== Monza ===
==== 2019–20 season ====
On 20 January 2020, Monza signed Mota on a six-month loan from Juventus, with obligation to buy in case Monza were promoted to the Serie B. He made his debut for his new team on 22 January 2019, coming on as a substitute on the 60th minute in a league match against Pro Patria. Mota scored his first goal for Monza 23 minutes later from a header, helping his team win 2–0. He scored two goals in six games, before the season was cut short due to COVID-19 precautions; Monza were crowned champions of Serie C, and were promoted to the Serie B for the first time in 19 years.

==== 2020–21 season ====
Mota's first Serie B game for Monza during the 2020–21 season was in the season opener on 25 September 2020, drawing 0–0 to newly relegated SPAL. His first goal of the season came on 7 November, helping Monza win 2–0 against Frosinone in the league. On 17 April 2021, Mota scored and made an assist in a 2–1 home win against Cremonese. He finished the season with six goals and five assists.

==== 2021–22 season ====
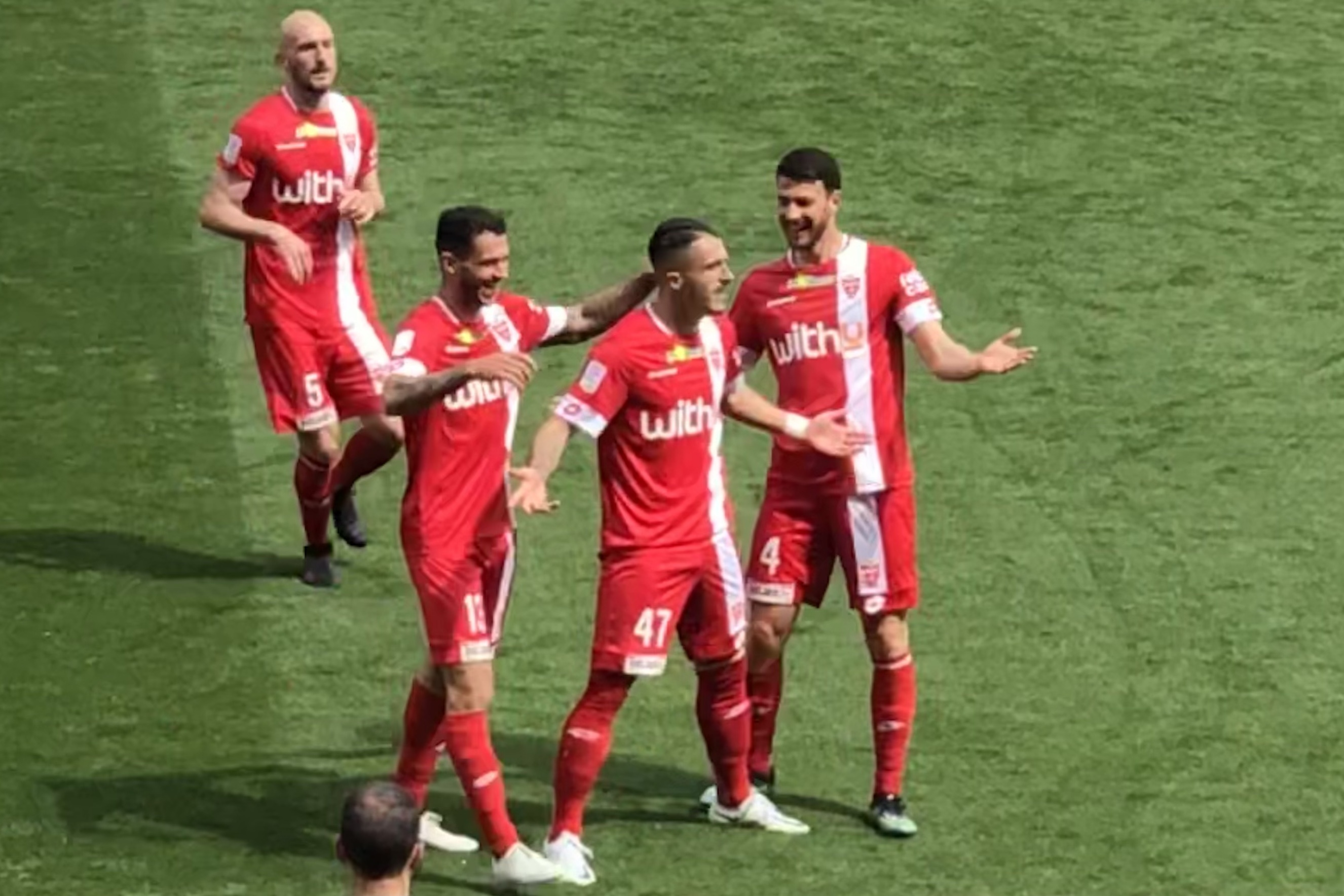
Mota celebrating with his teammates after scoring a goal for Monza in 2022

On 18 September 2021, Mota scored his first goal of the 2021–22 season: a 30-meter shot in the 5th minute against Ternana; the match ended in a 1–1 draw. He scored braces in consecutive home games – a 3–2 win against Como and a 4–1 win against Cosenza – equalling his previous season's league goal tally of six goals on 30 November. Mota was key in helping Monza gain promotion to the Serie A for the first time, scoring 12 goals and making 5 assists in 32 games throughout the season.

==== 2022–23 season ====
Mota made his Serie A debut on 13 August 2022, as a substitute at home against Torino; he scored Monza's first-ever Serie A goal in stoppage time, with the match ending in a 2–1 defeat. He finished the season with five goals in 29 Serie A matches, scoring in wins against Salernitana (3–0), Juventus (2–0), Fiorentina (3–2) and Napoli (2–0). On 4 August 2023, Monza renewed Mota's contract until 30 June 2027.

== International career ==
=== Youth ===
On 5 September 2019, Mota made his youth international debut for Portugal U21, scoring a brace against Gibraltar in a 4–0 win at the 2021 UEFA European Under-21 Championship qualification. He scored four goals in the qualifiers, helping Portugal reach the final tournament. In the group stage, Mota scored a goal against England to help Portugal qualify to the knock-out stage. His brace, including a bicycle kick which was nominated Goal of the Tournament, against Italy in the quarter-finals enabled Portugal to win 5–3 after extra time and qualify to the semi-finals against Spain. Portugal finished the tournament as runners-up, losing the final 1–0 to Germany.

=== Senior ===
Mota was first called up to the Portugal senior national team in March 2024, ahead of two friendly matches against Sweden and Slovenia.

== Style of play ==
Mota is known to play in a multitude of offensive positions, mainly as a second striker or winger. He has also been noted for his dribbling, ball control, and stamina.

== Personal life ==
Mota speaks five languages: Portuguese, Italian, German, French, and Luxembourgish. His idol is compatriot Cristiano Ronaldo: indeed, while at Virtus Entella, Mota has been nicknamed "the CR7 of Chiavari" (Italian: il CR7 di Chiavari). Mota also follows the NBA, and is a fan of LeBron James.

== Career statistics ==
=== Club ===
As of match played 29 May 2026

Appearances and goals by club, season and competition
Club	Season	League			National cup (Note: Includes Coppa Italia)		Other		Total	
Club	Season	Division	Apps	Goals	Apps	Goals	Apps	Goals	Apps	Goals
CS Pétange	2014–15	Luxembourg Division of Honour	14	2	—		—		14	2
Virtus Entella (loan)	2015–16	Serie B	2	0	—		—		2	0
Virtus Entella	2016–17	Serie B	6	1	0	0	—		6	1
Virtus Entella	2017–18	Serie B	3	0	1	0	—		4	0
Virtus Entella	2018–19	Serie C	35	13	4	1	0	0	39	14
Virtus Entella	Total		46	14	5	1	0	0	51	15
Juventus U23 (res.)	2019–20	Serie C	20	7	—		4 (Note: Appearances in Coppa Italia Serie C)	1	24	8
Monza (loan)	2019–20	Serie C	6	2	—		—		6	2
Monza	2020–21	Serie B	33	6	1	1	2 (Note: Appearances in Serie B promotion play-offs)	0	36	7
Monza	2021–22	Serie B	28	11	0	0	4	1	32	12
Monza	2022–23	Serie A	29	5	1	0	—		30	5
Monza	2023–24	Serie A	34	4	1	0	—		35	4
Monza	2024–25	Serie A	31	5	2	0	—		33	5
Monza	2025–26	Serie B	30	5	1	0	4	0	35	5
Monza	Total		185	36	6	1	10	1	201	38
Career total			271	61	11	2	14	2	296	65

=== International ===
As of match played 6 June 2021

Appearances and goals by national team and year
National team	Year	Apps	Goals
Portugal U21	2019	5	3
Portugal U21	2020	6	1
Portugal U21	2021	5	3
Total		16	7

== Honours ==
Virtus Entella

- Serie C Group A: 2018–19

Monza

- Serie C Group A: 2019–20

Portugal U21

- UEFA European Under-21 Championship runner-up: 2021

Individual

- UEFA European Under-21 Championship Squad of the Tournament: 2021
- UEFA European Under-21 Championship Goal of the Tournament: 2021
- Serie A Goal of the Month: March 2024
- Serie A Goal of the Season: 2023–24
