= Alessandro Sorrentino =

Italian footballer (born 2002)

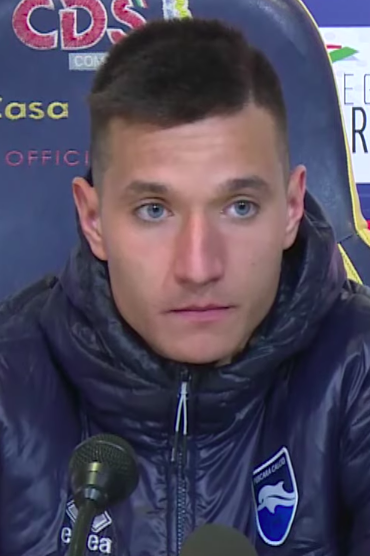
- Sorrentino with Pescara in 2022

Personal information
- Date of birth: 3 April 2002 (age 24)
- Place of birth: Guardiagrele, Italy
- Height: 1.90 m (6 ft 3 in)
- Position: Goalkeeper

Team information
- Current team: Padova
- Number: 22

Youth career
- 2008–2016: Lanciano
- 2016–2017: Angolana
- 2017–2021: Pescara

Senior career*
Years	Team	Apps	(Gls)
2021–2022	Pescara	29	(0)
2022–2026	Monza	7	(0)
2024–2025	→ Frosinone (loan)	2	(0)
2025–2026	→ Padova (loan)	24	(0)
2026–	Padova	0	(0)

International career^{‡}
2022	Italy U20	2	(0)
2023	Italy U21	1	(0)
- * Club domestic league appearances and goals as of 13 May 2026 ‡ National team caps and goals as of 24 March 2023

Alessandro Sorrentino (born 3 April 2002) is an Italian professional footballer who plays as a goalkeeper for Serie B club Padova.

== Club career ==
=== Early career ===
Sorrentino started playing for Lanciano at six years old as an outfield player; he became a goalkeeper following a friendly match where he was forced to replace the team's missing goalkeeper. Despite Lanciano gaining promotion to the Serie B, they declared bankruptcy in 2016; Sorrentino left the club on a free transfer, and joined Renato Curi Angolana. After one season, he moved to Pescara's youth sector in 2017.

=== Pescara ===
Sorrentino was first integrated to the senior team during the 2019–20 Serie B season, during which he also played as the first-choice goalkeeper in the Primavera (under-19) team, that was newly promoted to the Campionato Primavera 1.

He made his senior debut for Pescara on 15 September 2021, starting a 2–0 Coppa Serie C home win against Grosseto. A month later, Sorrentino made his Serie C debut. He signed his first professional contract in March 2022, effectively replacing Raffaele Di Gennaro as the starting goalkeeper. Sorrentino was a key player for Pescara, playing 29 league games during the 2021–22 season.

=== Monza ===
On 13 July 2022, Sorrentino joined newly promoted Serie A side Monza on a five-year deal, as part of a swap deal involving Daniele Sommariva and Luca Lombardi moving the other way.

On 26 August 2024, Sorrentino was loaned by Frosinone in Serie B.

=== Padova ===
On 19 August 2025, Sorrentino moved on loan to Padova, with an option to buy.

On 1 July 2026, Padova made the transfer permanent and signed a three-season contract with Sorrentino.

== International career ==
Having already represented Italy internationally at under-20 level since March 2022, Sorrentino was called by Italy national team coach Roberto Mancini in May 2022 to a training camp with Italy's most promising youth players as the only player from Serie C.

In June 2022, after having been called up to the U20 team again, Sorrentino was first selected by Paolo Nicolato to the under-21 team.

== Career statistics ==
=== Club ===
As of match played 12 May 2022

Appearances and goals by club, season and competition
Club	Season	League			Coppa Italia		Other		Total	
Club	Season	Division	Apps	Goals	Apps	Goals	Apps	Goals	Apps	Goals
Pescara	2021–22	Serie C	26	0	0	0	4 (Note: One appearance in Coppa Italia Serie C, three appearances in Serie C promotion play-offs)	0	30	0
Monza	2022–23	Serie A	0	0	0	0	—		0	0
Career total			26	0	0	0	4	0	30	0
