= Christian Maldini =

Italian footballer (born 1996)

Personal information
- Date of birth: 14 June 1996 (age 30)
- Place of birth: Milan, Italy
- Height: 1.87 m (6 ft 2 in)
- Position: Centre-back

Youth career
- 2004–2016: AC Milan
- 2013–2014: → Brescia (loan)

Senior career*
Years	Team	Apps	(Gls)
2016–2017	Reggiana	1	(0)
2016–2017	→ Hamrun Spartans (loan)	5	(0)
2017	Pro Sesto	4	(0)
2017–2018	Fondi	13	(0)
2018–2019	Pro Piacenza	12	(1)
2019	Fano	12	(0)
2019–2022	Pro Sesto	41	(0)
2022–2023	Lecco	3	(0)
- * Club domestic league appearances and goals

Christian Maldini (born 14 June 1996) is an Italian former professional footballer who played as a defender. A left-footed defender, he was capable of playing as a centre-back and as a left-back.

== Career ==
=== Early career ===
Maldini started his career at A.C. Milan Primavera but never broke through to the first team. In 2014, he spent half-season on loan at Brescia, but failed to make an appearance for the side. In honor of his recently deceased grandfather, Cesare, Maldini was named as the Milan Primavera captain for an Under-19 friendly match against Novara in April 2016.

In July 2016, Maldini left Milan for Reggiana, and subsequently loaned out to Hamrun Spartans. On 18 September 2016, he made his professional debut in the Maltese Premier League, playing as a starter in a 3–1 victory against St. Andrews.

=== Later career ===
On 23 January 2017, Maldini's loan at Hamrun Spartans was terminated and he was released by Reggiana to join Pro Sesto in Serie D.

He spent the 2017–18 season with Serie C club Fondi. On 6 July 2018, he was unveiled as a new player of Serie C club Pro Piacenza.

Pro Piacenza experienced financial troubles in the winter of 2019, and on 5 February 2019 he signed with Fano until the end of the 2018–19 season. In November 2019, he returned to Pro Sesto.

After two seasons at Pro Sesto, in August 2022 Maldini joined fellow Serie C club Lecco. He played just three games as a substitute during the next season, which saw Lecco clinch promotion to Serie B via play-offs.

On 12 September 2023, Maldini announced his retirement aged 27 to pursue a career as a football agent.

== Personal life ==
Christian is the son of former AC Milan and Italy player Paolo Maldini, and the grandson of Cesare Maldini. His paternal family was of mixed Italian-Slovenian descent. His younger brother, Daniel, is a footballer who plays for Cagliari calcio. He is of Venezuelan descent through his mother.
