= Andrey Alshanik =

Belarusian footballer

Personal information
- Date of birth: 3 May 1999 (age 27)
- Place of birth: Osipovichi, Mogilev Oblast, Belarus
- Height: 1.75 m (5 ft 9 in)
- Position: Midfielder

Team information
- Current team: Molodechno
- Number: 15

Youth career
- 2015–2018: BATE Borisov

Senior career*
Years	Team	Apps	(Gls)
2017–2018	BATE Borisov	0	(0)
2018–2020	Energetik-BGU Minsk	17	(0)
2019	→ Naftan Novopolotsk (loan)	12	(4)
2020	→ Krumkachy Minsk (loan)	25	(5)
2021–2023	Slavia Mozyr	46	(2)
2023	Maxline Vitebsk	21	(6)
2024	Slutsk	10	(0)
2024	Maxline Vitebsk	19	(1)
2025	Bumprom Gomel	29	(2)
2026–	Molodechno	14	(3)

International career
2017	Belarus U19	4	(0)
2019	Belarus U21	1	(1)
- * Club domestic league appearances and goals as of 6 July 2026

Andrey Alshanik (Belarusian: Андрэй Альшанік; Russian: Андрей Альшаник; born 3 May 1999) is a Belarusian professional footballer who plays for Molodechno.
