= Manuel Ferrini =

Italian footballer (born 1998)

Personal information
- Date of birth: 25 June 1998 (age 28)
- Place of birth: Rimini, Italy
- Height: 1.88 m (6 ft 2 in)
- Position: Centre back

Team information
- Current team: Gubbio
- Number: 70

Youth career
- Parma
- Sassuolo

Senior career*
Years	Team	Apps	(Gls)
2018–2020	Sicula Leonzio	40	(3)
2020–2021	Gubbio	34	(2)
2021–2023	Renate	8	(0)
2022	→ Vis Pesaro (loan)	14	(1)
2022–2023	→ Messina (loan)	18	(1)
2023–2025	Monopoli	38	(1)
2025–2026	Lecco	22	(2)
2026–	Gubbio	0	(0)
- * Club domestic league appearances and goals as of 22 August 2026

Manuel Ferrini (born 25 June 1998) is an Italian professional footballer who plays as a centre back for Serie C Group B club Gubbio.

== Club career ==
Born in Rimini, Ferrini finished his youth career in Sassuolo, then he joined Serie C club Sicula Leonzio.

In 2020, he signed for Gubbio.

On 6 July 2021, he joined Serie C club Renate. On 27 January 2022, he moved to Vis Pesaro on loan with an option to buy. On 1 September 2022, Ferrini was loaned by Messina.

On 5 July 2023, Ferrini signed a two-year contract with Monopoli.

On 16 January 2025, he joined Lecco.
