= Stefano Rubbi =

Italian footballer (born 2002)

Personal information
- Date of birth: 30 July 2002 (age 24)
- Place of birth: Bergamo, Italy
- Height: 1.92 m (6 ft 4 in)
- Position: Goalkeeper

Team information
- Current team: Caravaggio

Youth career
- –2018: Sarnico
- 2018–2019: Caravaggio
- 2020–2022: Monza

Senior career*
Years	Team	Apps	(Gls)
2019–2020	Caravaggio	19	(0)
2020–2023	Monza	0	(0)
2022	→ Lecco (loan)	0	(0)
2022–2023	→ Pergolettese (loan)	2	(0)
2025–	Caravaggio		

International career
2020	Italy U18 Serie D	3	(0)
- * Club domestic league appearances and goals as of 00:02, 10 September 2025 (UTC)

Stefano Rubbi (born 30 July 2002) is an Italian professional footballer who plays as a goalkeeper for Italian club Caravaggio.

== Club career ==
=== Caravaggio ===
Rubbi played youth football for Sarnico, before joining Caravaggio in 2018. His debut came in the 2019–20 Serie D season, playing 19 games.

=== Monza ===
On 1 July 2020, Rubbi joined Serie B club Monza's youth setup. He was first called up to the first team on 27 October 2020, as an unused substitute in a Coppa Italia game against Pordenone. Rubbi played 31 games for the Primavera (under-19) side between the 2020–21 and 2021–22 seasons, and made 22 appearances as an unused substitute for the first team.

==== Loan to Pergolettese ====
On 15 July 2022, Rubbi renewed his contract with Monza until 30 June 2024, and was sent on a one-year loan to Serie C side Lecco. The loan was terminated on 29 July, and Rubbi was loaned out to fellow Serie C side Pergolettese the same day. He debuted against Lecco on 10 September, as a half-time substitute in a 2–0 away defeat.

== International career ==
In 2020, Rubbi played for the Lega Nazionale Dilettanti representative under-18 team; he was capped three times at the "Roma Caput Mundi" tournament.

== Career statistics ==
=== Club ===
As of match played 16 October 2022

Appearances and goals by club, season and competition
Club	Season	League			Coppa Italia		Other		Total	
Club	Season	Division	Apps	Goals	Apps	Goals	Apps	Goals	Apps	Goals
Caravaggio	2019–20	Serie D	19	0	—		1 (Note: Appearance in Coppa Italia Serie D)	0	20	0
Monza	2020–21	Serie B	0	0	0	0	—		0	0
Monza	2021–22	Serie B	0	0	0	0	0	0	0	0
Monza	2022–23	Serie A	—		—		—		—	
Monza	Total		0	0	0	0	0	0	0	0
Lecco (loan)	2022–23	Serie C	—		—		—		—	
Pergolettese (loan)	2022–23	Serie C	2	0	0	0	—		2	0
Career total			21	0	0	0	1	0	22	0
