= Daniele Sommariva =

Italian footballer (born 1997)

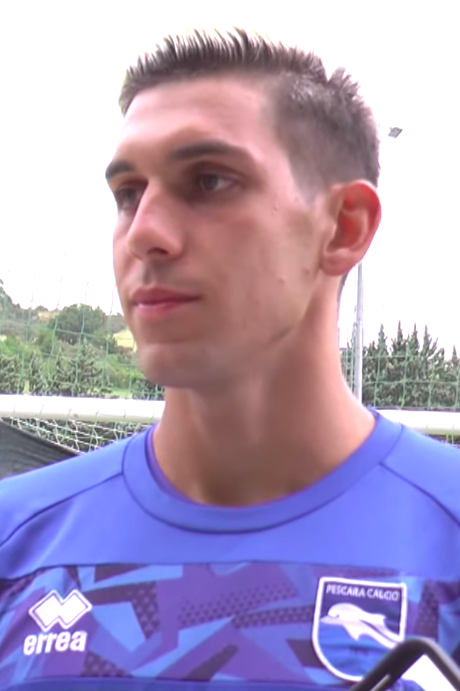
- Sommariva with Pescara in 2022

Personal information
- Date of birth: 18 July 1997 (age 29)
- Place of birth: Genoa, Italy
- Height: 1.85 m (6 ft 1 in)
- Position: Goalkeeper

Team information
- Current team: Genoa
- Number: 39

Youth career
- 2006–2008: Multedo
- 2008–2016: Genoa

Senior career*
Years	Team	Apps	(Gls)
2014–2016	Genoa	0	(0)
2016–2017	Nocerina	25	(0)
2017–2018	Bustese	29	(0)
2018–2022	Monza	4	(0)
2022–2023	Pescara	11	(0)
2023–	Genoa	4	(0)
- * Club domestic league appearances and goals as of 25 May 2026

Daniele Sommariva (born 18 July 1997) is an Italian professional footballer who plays as a goalkeeper for Serie A club Genoa.

Coming through Genoa's youth sector, Sommariva started his senior career in 2016 at Nocerina in the Serie D, winning the honorific play-offs. In 2017 he moved to Bustese, before joining Monza in the Serie C, whom he helped gain promotion to the Serie B for the first time in 19 years. Sommariva joined Pescara in 2022.

== Career ==
=== Early career ===
Starting out his youth career at local club Multedo aged nine, Sommariva signed for Genoa's youth team two years later. He remained at their youth sector until 2016, having played 39 games for their Primavera squad.

On 1 August 2016, Sommariva joined Serie D club Nocerina. He played 24 league games in the 2016–17 season, winning the group G honorific play-offs. On 12 July 2017, he moved to Bustese—also in the Serie D—playing 29 league games in 2017–18.

=== Monza ===
==== 2018–2020: Serie C ====
On 11 July 2018, Serie C club Monza announced the signing of Sommariva. He made his debut for the club during the 2018–19 season, on 11 November 2018, in a 1–1 league draw to Vis Pesaro. Sommariva was Monza's goalkeeper for the Coppa Italia Serie C, where they finished runners-up after losing the finals to Viterbese.

The following season, Sommariva only featured in the Coppa Italia Serie C, without making an appearance in the league. After winning the Serie C, Monza were promoted to the Serie B for the first time in 19 years.

==== 2020–2022: Serie B ====
Starting as Monza's third-choice goalkeeper of the season, Sommariva made his Serie B debut on 20 October 2020, in a 1–1 draw to Pisa, due to the positivity of Eugenio Lamanna and Michele Di Gregorio—Monza's first-choice goalkeepers—to COVID-19. Sommariva also played the following game, on 24 October to Chievo, where Monza lost 2–1. On 27 October, he made his debut in the Coppa Italia against Pordenone in the third round. With Monza being reduced to 10 men, Sommariva kept a clean sheet throughout the 120 minutes (including extra time), and saved three of Pordenone's four penalties in the penalty shoot-out, to help Monza pass to the fourth round.

Despite Lamanna's return to the team, Sommariva kept his place as the first-choice keeper against Cittadella in the league; Monza won 2–1 in their first league win of the season.

=== Pescara ===
On 13 July 2022, Sommariva joined Serie C side Pescara, alongside teammate Luca Lombardi, as part of a swap deal involving Alessandro Sorrentino moving the other way.

=== Return to Genoa ===
On 5 July 2023, Sommariva returned to Genoa ahead of the 2023–24 Serie A season.

== Career statistics ==
As of match played 29 December 2025

Appearances and goals by club, season and competition
Club	Season	League			Coppa Italia		Other		Total	
Club	Season	Division	Apps	Goals	Apps	Goals	Apps	Goals	Apps	Goals
Genoa	2014–15	Serie A	0	0	0	0	—		0	0
Genoa	2015–16	Serie A	0	0	—		—		0	0
Genoa	Total		0	0	0	0	0	0	0	0
Nocerina	2016–17	Serie D	25	0	—		2 (Note: Appearances in Serie D play-offs)	0	27	0
Bustese	2017–18	Serie D	29	0	—		3 (Note: Appearances in Coppa Italia Serie D)	0	32	0
Monza	2018–19	Serie C	1	0	0	0	7 (Note: Appearances in Coppa Italia Serie C)	0	8	0
Monza	2019–20	Serie C	0	0	0	0	2	0	2	0
Monza	2020–21	Serie B	3	0	1	0	0	0	4	0
Monza	2021–22	Serie B	0	0	0	0	0	0	0	0
Monza	Total		4	0	1	0	9	0	14	0
Pescara	2022–23	Serie C	11	0	—		2 (Note: Appearances in Serie C play-offs)	0	13	0
Genoa	2023–24	Serie A	1	0	0	0	—		1	0
Genoa	2024–25	Serie A	1	0	0	0	—		1	0
Genoa	2025–26	Serie A	2	0	0	0	—		2	0
Genoa	Total		4	0	0	0	—		4	0
Career total			73	0	1	0	16	0	90	0

== Honours ==
Nocerina

- Serie D Group G play-offs: 2016–17

Monza

- Serie C Group A: 2019–20
- Coppa Italia Serie C runner-up: 2018–19
