= Daniel Maldini =

Italian footballer (born 2001)

Personal information
- Date of birth: 11 October 2001 (age 25)
- Place of birth: Milan, Italy
- Height: 1.88 m (6 ft 2 in)
- Positions: Attacking midfielder; forward

Team information
- Current team: Cagliari (on loan from Atalanta)
- Number: 70

Youth career
- 2010–2020: AC Milan

Senior career*
Years	Team	Apps	(Gls)
2020–2024	AC Milan	15	(1)
2022–2023	→ Spezia (loan)	18	(2)
2023–2024	→ Empoli (loan)	7	(0)
2024	→ Monza (loan)	11	(4)
2024–2025	Monza	20	(3)
2025–	Atalanta	19	(3)
2026	→ Lazio (loan)	12	(2)
2026–	→ Cagliari (loan)	9	(5)

International career^{‡}
2019	Italy U18	2	(0)
2019	Italy U19	2	(0)
2021	Italy U20	3	(1)
2024–	Italy	9	(0)
- * Club domestic league appearances and goals as of 22:25, 27 October 2026 (UTC) ‡ National team caps and goals as of 16:00, 6 October 2026 (UTC)

Daniel Maldini (born 11 October 2001) is an Italian professional footballer who plays as an attacking midfielder or forward for Serie A club Cagliari, on loan from Atalanta.

== Early and personal life ==
Maldini was born in Milan, the second son of Paolo Maldini, the captain of AC Milan, and Venezuelan model Adriana Fossa. His grandfather Cesare also captained Milan in the 1960s, making him the third generation to make appearances for the club. His paternal family was of mixed Italian-Slovenian descent. His elder brother Christian had played for Milan's youth teams and went on to play professionally at a lower level before retiring at 27 and focusing on work as an agent.

On 13 September 2026, at around 5:15 AM local time, Maldini's car was involved in a traffic collision on the outskirts of Milan, with him being the driver. Both sets of car occupants were taken to hospitals and treated for minor injuries. Following a sobriety test, the police found alcohol in Maldini's system and immediately revoked his driver's license for driving under the influence.

== Club career ==
=== Youth career ===
Maldini joined Milan's youth system in 2011, and over the following years he came through the various age-group teams, from the under-10 Pulcini to the under-19 Primavera. In the 2016–17 season, he was part of the squad that won the Under-16 National Championship (Campionato Nazionale Under-16), defeating Lazio 5–2 in the final.

=== AC Milan ===
In July 2019, Maldini was called up for pre-season training with senior team by the newly appointed head coach Marco Giampaolo. On 23 July 2019, Maldini made his senior debut for AC Milan in the ICC friendly tournament, playing for nearly an hour in the starting line-up against Bayern Munich in Kansas City, Kansas.

On 2 February 2020, Maldini played his first competitive game with Milan in a 1–1 Serie A home draw against Hellas Verona, coming on as an added-time substitute for Samu Castillejo.

On 15 September 2021, Maldini came off the bench against Liverpool in a 3–2 defeat on his UEFA Champions League debut. On 25 September, Maldini started his first match for Milan in Serie A and scored the first goal in a 2–1 away win against Spezia.

On 22 May 2022, he won his first trophy, the Serie A championship, like his father, Paolo Maldini and grandfather, Cesare Maldini before him. Throughout the season, he did not break through into the starting lineup, playing only 239 minutes in 13 matches in the club's league-winning 2021–22 Serie A campaign.

==== Loan to Spezia ====
On 29 July 2022, fellow Serie A side Spezia announced Maldini had joined the club on a one-year loan from AC Milan.

On 5 November 2022, on his league debut as a starter with Spezia, Maldini scored his first Serie A goal of the season against his parent team, AC Milan. On 10 March 2023, he scored a goal in a 2–1 victory over Inter Milan, to be Spezia's first ever win against the latter.

==== Loan to Empoli ====
On 10 July 2023, fellow Serie A side Empoli announced the signing of Maldini on a one-year loan with an option to buy.

=== Monza ===
On 10 January 2024, Milan sent Maldini on loan to fellow Serie A club Monza until the end of the 2023–24 season. He scored four goals in 11 league games. The deal was made permanent on 31 July 2024, with the player signing a two-year contract.

=== Atalanta ===
On 1 February 2025, Maldini moved permanently to Atalanta from Monza, for a reported transfer fee of €13 million including performance-related bonuses.

==== Loan to Lazio ====
On 27 January 2026, Maldini was loaned to Lazio for the remainder of the 2025–26 season, with an option to buy that would become an obligation under certain conditions. He scored his first goal for the club in a 2–1 victory over Sassuolo on 9 March 2026.

==== Loan to Cagliari ====
On 9 August 2026, Maldini joined Cagliari on loan for the 2026–27 season, with an option to buy that becomes mandatory if certain sporting conditions are met.

== International career ==
Maldini is eligible to represent either his native country Italy or Venezuela, the latter through his mother. He debuted for Italy national under-18 football team in a 2–0 victory against the Netherlands on 22 March 2019. Later that year, Maldini earned two caps for the under-19. In 2021, he played three times for Italy under-20 and scored his first international goal in a 1–1 draw against England on 7 October 2021.

Maldini received his first call-up with the Italy national team for the 2024–25 UEFA Nations League matches against Belgium and Israel on 10 and 14 October 2024 respectively. He debuted against the latter opponent in a 4-1 victory, coming as a substitute at the 74th minute.

== Style of play ==
Although in his very early days Maldini played as a defender like both his father Paolo and grandfather Cesare, he soon started to be employed in offensive roles. Today he mainly plays as a free roaming attacking midfielder, a position that suits his playmaking ability, dribbling skills, ball control, and vision.

== Career statistics ==
=== Club ===
As of match played 27 October 2026

Appearances and goals by club, season and competition
Club	Season	League			Coppa Italia		Europe		Total	
Club	Season	Division	Apps	Goals	Apps	Goals	Apps	Goals	Apps	Goals
AC Milan	2019–20	Serie A	2	0	0	0	—		2	0
AC Milan	2020–21	Serie A	5	0	0	0	4 (Note: Appearances in UEFA Europa League)	0	9	0
AC Milan	2021–22	Serie A	8	1	2	0	3 (Note: Appearance(s) in UEFA Champions League)	0	13	1
AC Milan	Total		15	1	2	0	7	0	24	1
Spezia (loan)	2022–23	Serie A	18	2	2	1	—		20	3
Empoli (loan)	2023–24	Serie A	7	0	0	0	—		7	0
Monza (loan)	2023–24	Serie A	11	4	—		—		11	4
Monza	2024–25	Serie A	20	3	1	0	—		21	3
Monza	Monza total		31	7	1	0	0	0	32	7
Atalanta	2024–25	Serie A	10	3	1	0	0	0	11	3
Atalanta	2025–26	Serie A	9	0	1	0	1	0	11	0
Atalanta	Total		19	3	2	0	1	0	22	3
Lazio (loan)	2025–26	Serie A	12	2	2	0	—		14	2
Cagliari (loan)	2026–27	Serie A	9	5	2	0	—		11	5
Career total			111	20	11	1	8	0	130	21

=== International ===
As of match played 5 October 2026

Appearances and goals by national team and year
National team	Year	Apps	Goals
Italy	2024	2	0
Italy	2025	4	0
Italy	2026	3	0
Total		9	0

== Honours ==
AC Milan

- Serie A: 2021–22

== See also ==
- List of European association football families
