= Denis Grechikho =

Belarusian footballer

Personal information
- Date of birth: 22 May 1999 (age 27)
- Place of birth: Mogilev, Belarus
- Height: 1.85 m (6 ft 1 in)
- Position: Midfielder

Team information
- Current team: Dynamo Brest
- Number: 19

Youth career
- 2016–2017: Dnepr Mogilev

Senior career*
Years	Team	Apps	(Gls)
2017–2018	Dnepr Mogilev	30	(0)
2019	Dnyapro Mogilev	0	(0)
2019	→ Rukh Brest (loan)	13	(4)
2019–2021	Rukh Brest	64	(13)
2022	Dinamo Minsk	27	(4)
2023–2024	BATE Borisov	17	(0)
2024	→ Zhenis (loan)	18	(1)
2025	Dinamo Minsk	21	(0)
2026–	Dynamo Brest	12	(1)

International career^{‡}
2018–2020	Belarus U21	11	(2)
2022–2023	Belarus	5	(0)
- * Club domestic league appearances and goals as of 6 July 2026 ‡ National team caps and goals as of 28 March 2023

Denis Grechikho (Belarusian: Дзяніс Грачыха; Russian: Денис Гречихо; born 22 May 1999) is a Belarusian professional footballer who plays as a midfielder for Dynamo Brest.
