= Nicolas Belloni =

Argentine footballer

Personal information
- Full name: Nicolas Alexis Anthony Belloni
- Date of birth: 7 February 2001 (age 25)
- Place of birth: Buenos Aires, Argentina
- Height: 1.87 m (6 ft 2 in)
- Position: Forward

Team information
- Current team: Ischia
- Number: 15

Youth career
- –2020: River Plate
- 2020–2021: Pescara

Senior career*
Years	Team	Apps	(Gls)
2020–2023	Pescara	4	(0)
2021–2022	→ Imolese (loan)	31	(4)
2022–2023	→ Potenza (loan)	14	(1)
2023	→ Latina (loan)	13	(0)
2023–2024	Notaresco	33	(13)
2024–2025	L'Aquila	33	(4)
2025–2026	Atletico Ascoli	20	(2)
2026–	Ischia	5	(0)
- * Club domestic league appearances and goals as of 4 March 2026

Nicolas Alexis Anthony Belloni (born 7 February 2001) is an Argentine footballer who plays as a forward for Italian Serie D club Ischia.

== Club career ==
He made his Serie B debut for Pescara on 17 October 2020 in a game against Empoli. He substituted Miloš Bočić in the 82nd minute. He made his first start on 2 November in a game against Lecce.

On 31 August 2021, he joined Serie C club Imolese on a season-long loan. On 26 July 2022, Belloni was loaned to Potenza. On 5 January 2023, he moved on a new loan to Latina.
