= Luca Lombardi (footballer) =

Italian footballer (born 2002)

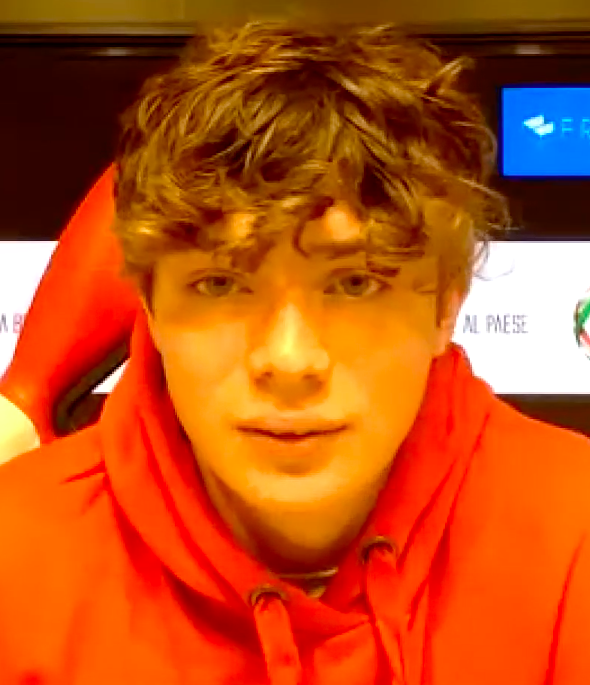
- Lombardi with Teramo in 2021

Personal information
- Date of birth: 6 December 2002 (age 23)
- Place of birth: Ancona, Italy
- Height: 1.75 m (5 ft 9 in)
- Position: Midfielder

Team information
- Current team: Pineto
- Number: 21

Youth career
- –2017: Ancona
- 2017: Chievo
- 2017–2018: Fano
- 2018–2020: Recanatese
- 2020–2021: Monza

Senior career*
Years	Team	Apps	(Gls)
2019–2020	Recanatese	23	(0)
2020–2023	Monza	0	(0)
2021	→ Teramo (loan)	2	(0)
2021–2022	→ Vis Pesaro (loan)	28	(0)
2022–2023	Pescara	0	(0)
2022–2023	→ Alessandria (loan)	23	(1)
2023–	Pineto	103	(3)
- * Club domestic league appearances and goals as of 30 April 2026

Luca Lombardi (born 6 December 2002) is an Italian professional footballer who plays as a midfielder for Serie C Group B club Pineto.

== Career ==
=== Early career ===
Lombardi began his youth career at hometown club Ancona, before leaving the club in 2017 following the club's disestablishment. After brief experiences with Chievo and Fano, Lombardi moved to Recanatese in summer 2018 on a free transfer.

Following his first-team debut on 17 February 2019, Lombardi became a starter for Recanatese in Serie D, playing six games in 2018–19. The following season, Lombardi played 16 games in the first half of the 2019–20 Serie D season.

=== Monza ===
On 2 January 2000, Lombardi joined Serie C side Monza. He made his professional debut on 27 October 2020, coming on as a substitute in a Coppa Italia third-round game against Pordenone; Monza won the match on penalties.

On 28 January 2021, Lombardi was sent on a six-month loan to Teramo in the Serie C. He played two league games in 2020–21, both as a starter. On 20 July 2021, Lombardi moved to Serie C side Vis Pesaro on a one-year loan.

=== Pescara ===
On 13 July 2022, Lombardi joined Serie C side Pescara, alongside teammate Daniele Sommariva, as part of a swap deal involving Alessandro Sorrentino moving the other way.

==== Loan to Alessandria ====
On 12 August 2022, he joined Alessandria on loan.

=== Pineto ===
On 26 July 2023, Lombardi signed a two-year contract with Pineto, freshly promoted to Serie C.

== Personal life ==
Lombardi's father, Massimo, is a football coach.

== Career statistics ==
As of match played 14 April 2022

Appearances and goals by club, season and competition
Club	Season	League			Coppa Italia		Other		Total	
Club	Season	Division	Apps	Goals	Apps	Goals	Apps	Goals	Apps	Goals
Recanatese	2018–19	Serie D	6	0	—		1 (Note: Appearance in Coppa Italia Serie D)	0	7	0
Recanatese	2019–20	Serie D	16	0	—		—		16	0
Recanatese	Total		22	0	0	0	1	0	23	0
Monza	2019–20	Serie C	0	0	—		—		0	0
Monza	2020–21	Serie B	0	0	1	0	—		1	0
Monza	Total		0	0	1	0	0	0	1	0
Teramo (loan)	2020–21	Serie C	2	0	—		0	0	2	0
Vis Pesaro (loan)	2021–22	Serie C	28	0	—		1 (Note: Appearance in Coppa Italia Serie C)	0	29	0
Career total			52	0	1	0	2	0	55	0
