= 2022–23 Charlton Athletic F.C. season =

Charlton Athletic
2022–23 season
- Chairman: Thomas Sandgaard
- Manager: Ben Garner (until 5 December 2022); Anthony Hayes (caretaker) (from 6 December 2022 until 20 December 2022); Dean Holden (from 20 December 2022)
- Stadium: The Valley
- League One: 10th
- FA Cup: Second round (vs. Stockport County)
- EFL Cup: Quarter-finals (vs. Manchester United)
- EFL Trophy: Second round (vs. Plymouth Argyle)
- Top goalscorer: League: Jesurun Rak-Sakyi (15); All: Jesrun Rak-Sakyi (15)
- Highest home attendance: 17,464 (vs. Brighton & Hove Albion, 21 December 2022)
- Lowest home attendance: 662 (vs. Brighton & Hove Albion U21, 2 November 2022)
- Average home league attendance: 13,436
Home colours	Away colours	Third colours

The 2022–23 Charlton Athletic season was the club's 117th season in their existence, having been founded in 1905, and their third back in League One following relegation from the Championship in 2020. Along with competing in League One, the club also participated in the FA Cup, EFL Cup and the EFL Trophy. The season covered the period from 1 July 2022 to 30 June 2023.

== Kit ==
Sportswear manufacturers Castore replaced Hummel as Kit suppliers. with sponsorship of Home and third shirts being RSK Group whilst the away shirt sponsor was the University of Greenwich.

== Squad statistics ==
As of 7 May 2023

No.	Pos	Nat	Player	Total		League One		FA Cup		League Cup		EFL Trophy	
No.	Pos	Nat	Player	Apps	Goals	Apps	Goals	Apps	Goals	Apps	Goals	Apps	Goals
1	GK	(Ghana) GHA	Joe Wollacott	20	0	16+0	0	1+0	0	3+0	0	0+0	0
2	DF	(England) ENG	Steven Sessegnon (on loan from Fulham)	38	1	27+6	1	2+0	0	2+1	0	0+0	0
3	DF	(Saint Lucia) LCA	Terell Thomas	18	1	12+3	1	1+0	0	0+0	0	1+1	0
4	MF	(England) ENG	George Dobson	53	1	44+1	1	2+1	0	4+1	0	0+0	0
5	DF	(Scotland) SCO	Samuel Lavelle	22	1	10+3	0	3+0	0	4+0	0	1+1	1
6	DF	(Republic of Ireland) IRL	Eoghan O'Connell	22	1	17+2	1	0+0	0	2+1	0	0+0	0
6	DF	(Jamaica) JAM	Michael Hector	17	0	16+1	0	0+0	0	0+0	0	0+0	0
7	MF	(England) ENG	Diallang Jaiyesimi	13	1	2+5	0	0+2	0	2+0	1	2+0	0
8	MF	(England) ENG	Jake Forster-Caskey	13	0	0+3	0	1+1	0	2+2	0	4+0	0
8	FW	(Zimbabwe) ZIM	Macauley Bonne	16	2	8+8	2	0+0	0	0+0	0	0+0	0
9	FW	(England) ENG	Jayden Stockley	29	3	20+4	2	1+0	1	1+3	0	0+0	0
10	MF	(England) ENG	Albie Morgan	45	5	24+11	3	3+0	1	3+1	0	2+1	1
11	MF	(England) ENG	Alex Gilbey	1	0	0+0	0	0+0	0	1+0	0	0+0	0
12	MF	(Scotland) SCO	Conor McGrandles	12	0	2+7	0	1+0	0	0+0	0	2+0	0
13	GK	(Scotland) SCO	Craig MacGillivray	6	0	4+0	0	1+0	0	0+0	0	1+0	0
14	MF	(England) ENG	Charlie Kirk	26	3	14+7	3	2+0	0	0+3	0	0+0	0
15	MF	(Republic of Ireland) IRL	Gavin Kilkenny (on loan from AFC Bournemouth)	8	0	6+2	0	0+0	0	0+0	0	0+0	0
16	DF	(England) ENG	Todd Kane (on loan from Coventry City)	5	0	1+4	0	0+0	0	0+0	0	0+0	0
17	FW	(England) ENG	Jesurun Rak-Sakyi (on loan from Crystal Palace)	49	15	40+3	15	1+1	0	3+1	0	0+0	0
18	DF	(England) ENG	Mandela Egbo	15	0	11+4	0	0+0	0	0+0	0	0+0	0
19	MF	(England) ENG	Jack Payne	50	7	12+27	4	2+0	2	4+1	0	4+0	1
21	MF	(Scotland) SCO	Scott Fraser	47	9	41+1	9	1+1	0	3+0	0	0+0	0
22	FW	(England) ENG	Chuks Aneke	18	3	1+12	1	2+1	1	0+2	1	0+0	0
23	MF	(England) ENG	Corey Blackett-Taylor	35	8	19+10	8	0+2	0	1+2	0	1+0	0
24	DF	(England) ENG	Ryan Inniss	41	2	34+2	2	1+0	0	3+1	0	0+0	0
26	DF	(England) ENG	Matt Penney (on loan from Ipswich Town)	5	0	3+2	0	0+0	0	0+0	0	0+0	0
27	DF	(England) ENG	Deji Elerewe	1	0	0+0	0	0+0	0	0+0	0	1+0	0
28	DF	(England) ENG	Sean Clare	49	1	36+4	1	3+0	0	3+1	0	2+0	0
29	DF	(England) ENG	Charles Clayden	10	0	5+3	0	0+0	0	1+0	0	0+1	0
30	GK	(England) ENG	Nathan Harness	3	0	0+0	0	0+0	0	0+0	0	3+0	0
31	GK	(Australia) AUS	Ashley Maynard-Brewer	29	0	26+0	0	1+0	0	2+0	0	0+0	0
32	MF	(England) ENG	Aaron Henry	21	2	3+11	0	0+1	0	1+2	1	3+0	1
33	FW	(England) ENG	Miles Leaburn	40	13	18+17	12	0+0	0	4+0	0	1+0	1
34	DF	(England) ENG	Lucas Ness	21	0	15+0	0	0+0	0	3+1	0	2+0	0
35	FW	(Sierra Leone) SLE	Daniel Kanu	14	1	2+8	0	0+0	0	0+0	0	3+1	1
36	DF	(England) ENG	Richard Chin	15	0	3+2	0	1+2	0	3+0	0	4+0	0
37	MF	(Northern Ireland) NIR	Euan Williams	1	0	0+0	0	0+0	0	0+0	0	0+1	0
38	DF	(England) ENG	Charlie Barker	1	0	0+0	0	0+0	0	0+0	0	1+0	0
39	DF	(England) ENG	Sam Oguntayo	0	0	0+0	0	0+0	0	0+0	0	0+0	0
40	DF	(England) ENG	Nazir Bakrin	1	0	0+0	0	0+0	0	0+0	0	0+1	0
41	GK	(Ivory Coast) CIV	Ahmed Kone	0	0	0+0	0	0+0	0	0+0	0	0+0	0
42	DF	(Australia) AUS	Matt Dench	1	0	0+0	0	0+0	0	0+0	0	0+1	0
43	MF	(Jamaica) JAM	Tyreece Campbell	29	2	13+9	2	2+1	0	0+0	0	2+2	0
44	FW	(England) ENG	Tolu Ladapo	1	0	0+0	0	0+0	0	0+0	0	0+1	0
45	MF	(Jamaica) JAM	Karoy Anderson	1	1	0+0	0	0+0	0	0+0	0	0+1	1
46	DF	(Scotland) SCO	Harris O'Connor	1	0	0+0	0	0+0	0	0+0	0	1+0	0
48	DF	(England) ENG	Zach Mitchell	10	0	1+5	0	1+1	0	0+0	0	2+0	0
49	FW	(Republic of Ireland) IRL	Patrick Casey	0	0	0+0	0	0+0	0	0+0	0	0+0	0
50	MF	(England) ENG	Henry Rylah	3	0	0+1	0	0+0	0	0+0	0	0+2	0
52	DF	(Uganda) UGA	Nathan Asiimwe	2	0	0+1	0	0+0	0	0+0	0	1+0	0
53	DF	(Czech Republic) CZE	Seydil Toure	0	0	0+0	0	0+0	0	0+0	0	0+0	0
54	MF	(England) ENG	Harvey Kedwell	0	0	0+0	0	0+0	0	0+0	0	0+0	0
55	DF	(England) ENG	Jacob Roddy	1	0	0+1	0	0+0	0	0+0	0	0+0	0
—	FW	(Republic of Ireland) IRL	Dylan Gavin	0	0	0+0	0	0+0	0	0+0	0	0+0	0
—	FW	(Wales) WAL	Ryan Viggars	0	0	0+0	0	0+0	0	0+0	0	0+0	0

=== Top scorers ===
As of 7 May 2023

Place	Position	Nation	Number	Name	League One	FA Cup	League Cup	EFL Trophy	Total
1	FW	(England)	17	Jesurun Rak-Sakyi	15	0	0	0	15
2	FW	(England)	33	Miles Leaburn	12	0	0	1	13
3	MF	(Scotland)	21	Scott Fraser	9	0	0	0	9
4	MF	(England)	23	Corey Blackett-Taylor	8	0	0	0	8
5	MF	(England)	19	Jack Payne	4	2	0	1	7
6	MF	(England)	10	Albie Morgan	3	1	0	1	5
7	MF	(England)	14	Charlie Kirk	3	0	0	0	3
=	FW	(England)	9	Jayden Stockley	2	1	0	0	3
=	FW	(England)	22	Chuks Aneke	1	1	1	0	3
10	DF	(England)	24	Ryan Inniss	2	0	0	0	2
=	FW	(Zimbabwe)	8	Macauley Bonne	2	0	0	0	2
=	MF	(Jamaica)	43	Tyreece Campbell	2	0	0	0	2
=	MF	(England)	32	Aaron Henry	0	0	1	1	2
14	DF	(England)	28	Sean Clare	1	0	0	0	1
=	DF	(Republic of Ireland)	6	Eoghan O'Connell	1	0	0	0	1
=	DF	(Saint Lucia)	3	Terell Thomas	1	0	0	0	1
=	MF	(England)	4	George Dobson	1	0	0	0	1
=	DF	(England)	2	Steven Sessegnon	1	0	0	0	1
=	MF	(England)	7	Diallang Jaiyesimi	0	0	1	0	1
=	DF	(Scotland)	5	Samuel Lavelle	0	0	0	1	1
=	FW	(Sierra Leone)	35	Daniel Kanu	0	0	0	1	1
=	MF	(Jamaica)	45	Karoy Anderson	0	0	0	1	1
Own goals					2	2	0	1	5
Totals					70	7	3	8	85

=== Disciplinary record ===
As of 7 May 2023

Number	Nation	Position	Name	League One		FA Cup		League Cup		EFL Trophy		Total	
Number	Nation	Position	Name	Booked	Sent off (straight red)	Booked	Sent off (straight red)	Booked	Sent off (straight red)	Booked	Sent off (straight red)	Booked	Sent off (straight red)
4	(England)	MF	George Dobson	14	0	1	0	0	0	0	0	15	0
28	(England)	DF	Sean Clare	9	0	1	0	2	0	1	0	13	0
10	(England)	MF	Albie Morgan	7	0	0	0	0	0	1	0	8	0
33	(England)	FW	Miles Leaburn	5	0	0	0	1	0	0	0	6	0
2	(England)	DF	Steven Sessegnon	5	0	0	0	0	0	0	0	5	0
24	(England)	DF	Ryan Inniss	4	4	0	0	0	0	0	0	4	4
6	(Jamaica)	DF	Michael Hector	4	0	0	0	0	0	0	0	4	0
6	(Republic of Ireland)	DF	Eoghan O'Connell	3	0	0	0	0	0	0	0	3	0
8	(Zimbabwe)	FW	Macauley Bonne	3	0	0	0	0	0	0	0	3	0
17	(England)	FW	Jesurun Rak-Sakyi	3	0	0	0	0	0	0	0	3	0
5	(England)	DF	Samuel Lavelle	2	0	0	0	1	0	0	0	3	0
14	(England)	MF	Charlie Kirk	1	0	1	0	1	0	0	0	3	0
36	(England)	DF	Richard Chin	1	0	0	0	1	0	1	0	3	0
19	(England)	MF	Jack Payne	2	1	0	0	0	0	0	0	2	1
34	(England)	DF	Lucas Ness	2	0	0	0	0	0	0	0	2	0
21	(Scotland)	MF	Scott Fraser	2	0	0	0	0	0	0	0	2	0
8	(England)	MF	Jake Forster-Caskey	0	0	1	0	1	0	0	0	2	0
32	(England)	MF	Aaron Henry	0	0	0	0	0	0	2	0	2	0
29	(England)	DF	Charles Clayden	1	0	0	0	0	0	0	0	1	0
12	(Scotland)	MF	Conor McGrandles	1	0	0	0	0	0	0	0	1	0
18	(England)	DF	Mandela Egbo	1	0	0	0	0	0	0	0	1	0
22	(England)	FW	Chuks Aneke	1	0	0	0	0	0	0	0	1	0
26	(England)	DF	Matt Penney	1	0	0	0	0	0	0	0	1	0
23	(England)	MF	Corey Blackett-Taylor	1	0	0	0	0	0	0	0	1	0
3	(Saint Lucia)	DF	Terell Thomas	1	0	0	0	0	0	0	0	1	0
31	(Australia)	GK	Ashley Maynard-Brewer	1	0	0	0	0	0	0	0	1	0
16	(England)	DF	Todd Kane	1	0	0	0	0	0	0	0	1	0
43	(Jamaica)	MF	Tyreece Campbell	0	0	1	0	0	0	0	0	1	0
48	(England)	DF	Zach Mitchell	0	0	1	0	0	0	0	0	1	0
42	(Australia)	DF	Matt Dench	0	0	0	0	0	0	1	0	1	0
Totals				76	5	6	0	7	0	6	0	95	5

== Transfers ==
=== Transfers in ===
Date from	Position	Nationality	Name	From	Fee	Ref.
1 July 2022 (Note: The transfer of Mandela Egbo was announced on 21 June 2022 and would become official on 1 July 2022 once his Swindon Town contract expired.)	RB	(England)	Mandela Egbo	(England) Swindon Town	Free transfer	
1 July 2022 (Note: The transfer of Conor McGrandles was announced on 21 June 2022 and would become official on 1 July 2022 once his Lincoln City contract expired.)	MF	(Scotland)	Conor McGrandles	(England) Lincoln City	Free transfer	
1 July 2022 (Note: The transfer of Eoghan O'Connell was announced on 20 June 2022 and would become official on 1 July 2022 once his Rochdale contract expired.)	CB	(Republic of Ireland)	Eoghan O'Connell	(England) Rochdale	Free transfer	
1 July 2022 (Note: The transfer of Joe Wollacott was announced on 23 June 2022 and would become official on 1 July 2022 once his Swindon Town contract expired.)	GK	(Ghana)	Joe Wollacott	(England) Swindon Town	Free transfer	
18 July 2022	AM	(England)	Jack Payne	(England) Swindon Town	Free transfer	
7 September 2022	CB	(Saint Lucia)	Terell Thomas	Free Agent	—N/a	
12 January 2023	CF	(Zimbabwe)	Macauley Bonne	Free Agent	—N/a	
31 January 2023	CB	(Jamaica)	Michael Hector	Free Agent	—N/a	

=== Transfers out ===
Date from	Position	Nationality	Name	To	Fee	Ref.
1 July 2022	MF	(England)	Terrell Agyemang	(England) Manchester City	Released	
1 July 2022	CF	(Algeria)	Wassim Aouachria	(Republic of Ireland) Waterford	Released	
1 July 2022	MF	(England)	Jimmy Appiah	Free agent	Released	
1 July 2022	CM	(England)	Ben Dempsey	(Scotland) Ayr United	Undisclosed	
1 July 2022	CF	(Lebanon)	Hady Ghandour	(England) Maidstone United	Released	
1 July 2022	RB	(Wales)	Chris Gunter	(England) AFC Wimbledon	Released	
1 July 2022	GK	(Republic of Ireland)	Stephen Henderson	Retired	—N/a	
1 July 2022	RB	(Wales)	Adam Matthews	(Cyprus) Omonia	Released	
1 July 2022	CB	(England)	Jason Pearce	Retired	—N/a	
1 July 2022	MF	(England)	Johl Powell	(England) Dulwich Hamlet	Released	
1 July 2022	LB	(England)	Ben Purrington	(Scotland) Ross County	Released	
1 July 2022	LB	(Senegal)	Pape Souaré	(England) Morecambe	Released	
1 July 2022	MF	(England)	James Vennings	(England) Bromley	Released	
1 July 2022	CF	(Northern Ireland)	Conor Washington	(England) Rotherham United	Released	
1 July 2022	CM	(England)	Ben Watson	Retired	—N/a	
1 July 2022	GK	(England)	Harry Whitling	Free agent	Released	
18 July 2022	CF	(England)	Josh Davison	(England) AFC Wimbledon	Undisclosed	
3 January 2023	CM	(England)	Jake Forster-Caskey	(England) Stevenage	Free transfer	
13 January 2023	GK	(Scotland)	Craig MacGillivray	(England) Burton Albion	Undisclosed	
30 January 2023	CF	(England)	Jayden Stockley	(England) Fleetwood Town	Undisclosed	
31 January 2023	CB	(Republic of Ireland)	Eoghan O'Connell	(Wales) Wrexham	Undisclosed	
23 March 2023	DF	(England)	Charles Clayden	(England) Wealdstone	Undisclosed	

=== Loans in ===
Date from	Position	Nationality	Name	From	Date until	Ref.
5 July 2022	RB	(England)	Steven Sessegnon	(England) Fulham	End of season	
11 August 2022	FW	(England)	Jesurun Rak-Sakyi	(England) Crystal Palace	End of season	
12 January 2023	RB	(England)	Todd Kane	(England) Coventry City	End of season	
21 January 2023	LB	(England)	Matt Penney	(England) Ipswich Town	End of season	
31 January 2023	CM	(Republic of Ireland)	Gavin Kilkenny	(England) AFC Bournemouth	End of season	

=== Loans out ===
Date from	Position	Nationality	Name	To	Date until	Ref.
1 July 2022	GK	(Australia)	Ashley Maynard-Brewer	(England) Gillingham	17 November 2022	
30 July 2022	CB	(England)	Deji Elerewe	(England) Wealdstone	7 November 2022	
19 August 2022	FW	(Republic of Ireland)	Dylan Gavin	(England) Tonbridge Angels	2 January 2023	
26 August 2022	MF	(Ecuador)	Jeremy Santos	(England) Tonbridge Angels	25 September 2022	
26 August 2022	FW	(Wales)	Ryan Viggars	(England) Needham Market	1 October 2022	
1 September 2022	CM	(England)	Alex Gilbey	(England) Stevenage	End of season	
1 September 2022	DF	(England)	Charlie Barker	(England) Hemel Hempstead Town	28 October 2022	
1 September 2022	DF	(Scotland)	Harris O’Connor	(England) Hemel Hempstead Town	1 January 2023	
7 October 2022	DF	(England)	Charles Clayden	(England) Bromley	6 January 2023	
25 October 2022	GK	(England)	Nathan Harness	(England) Bromley	17 November 2022	
28 October 2022	DF	(England)	Charlie Barker	(England) Wealdstone	End of season	
29 October 2022	DF	(England)	Lucas Ness	(England) Torquay United	1 December 2022	
26 November 2022	GK	(England)	Nathan Harvey	(England) Potters Bar Town	24 December 2022	
14 January 2023	FW	(Republic of Ireland)	Dylan Gavin	(England) Welling United	11 February 2023	
17 January 2023	MF	(Jamaica)	Karoy Anderson	(England) Aldershot Town	18 March 2023	
24 January 2023	MF	(Scotland)	Conor McGrandles	(England) Cambridge United	End of season	
31 January 2023	RW	(England)	Diallang Jaiyesimi	(England) AFC Wimbledon	End of season	
31 January 2023	LW	(England)	Charlie Kirk	(England) Burton Albion	End of season	
31 January 2023	CB	(Scotland)	Samuel Lavelle	(England) Burton Albion	End of season	
9 February 2023	CM	(England)	Sahid Kamara	(England) Corinthian Casuals	End of season	
9 February 2023	FW	(England)	Mack Reilly	(England) Corinthian Casuals	End of season	
21 February 2023	FW	(Republic of Ireland)	Dylan Gavin	(England) Dulwich Hamlet	20 March 2023	
25 February 2023	GK	(England)	Nathan Harvey	(England) Chatham Town	End of season	
3 March 2023	CB	(England)	Deji Elerewe	(England) Bromley	End of season	
16 March 2023	DF	(Republic of Ireland)	Sam Oguntayo	(England) Eastbourne Borough	End of season	
21 March 2023	MF	(Ecuador)	Jeremy Santos	(England) Tonbridge Angels	End of season	
23 March 2023	DF	(England)	Richard Chin	(England) Dartford	End of season	
24 March 2023	FW	(Republic of Ireland)	Dylan Gavin	(England) Welling United	End of season	
24 March 2023	FW	(Wales)	Ryan Viggars	(England) Maidstone United	End of season	

== Friendlies ==
On Monday 30 May 2022, Charlton announced a pre-season training camp in Spain. On 31 May 2022, Charlton Athletic announced its first confirmed friendlies taking place ahead of the 2021/22 season would be against Swansea City at The Valley. On 6 June 2022, Chartlon confirmed two further friendlies with Dartford and Sutton United. On 22 June 2022, a fourth friendly was announced against Kilmarnock which would take place during the club's Spanish training camp. On 6 July 2022, a fifth friendly was organised against Colchester United. A sixth, behind-closed-doors, friendly against Welling United was announced on Thursday 21 July 2022.

1 July 2022 Friendly	Kilmarnock	1–0	Charlton Athletic	Estepona, Spain
10:45 BST	Lafferty 62'	Report		Stadium: Marbella Football Center; Attendance: 0

9 July 2022 Friendly	Dartford	1–6	Charlton Athletic	Dartford
15:00 BST	Stockley 41' (o.g.)	Report	Kirk 33'; Stockley 53'; Leaburn 65', 72'; Clare 67' (pen.); Elerewe 87'	Stadium: Princes Park; Attendance: 2,775; Referee: Rob Whitton

12 July 2022 Friendly	Colchester United	2–4	Charlton Athletic	Colchester
19:30 BST	Sears 34'; Smith 37'	Report	Gilbey 41'; Judge 51' (o.g.); Leaburn 64'; Morgan 68'	Stadium: JobServe Community Stadium; Referee: Craig Hicks

16 July 2022 Friendly	Sutton United	0–0	Charlton Athletic	Sutton
15:00 BST		Report		Stadium: VBS Community Stadium; Referee: Craig Hicks

22 July 2022 Friendly	Charlton Athletic	3–0	Welling United	New Eltham
18:45 BST	Gilbey 49', 51'; Jaiyesimi 52'	Report		Stadium: Charlton Athletic Training Ground; Attendance: 0

23 July 2022 Friendly	Charlton Athletic	1–2	Swansea City	Charlton
15:00 BST	Darling 4' (o.g.)	Report	Piroe 53'; Manning 85'	Stadium: The Valley; Attendance: 3,345; Referee: John Busby

== Competitions ==
=== League One ===
==== League table ====
Pos	Team	Pld	W	D	L	GF	GA	GD	Pts
7	Derby County	46	21	13	12	67	46	+21	76
8	Portsmouth	46	17	19	10	61	50	+11	70
9	Wycombe Wanderers	46	20	9	17	59	51	+8	69
10	Charlton Athletic	46	16	14	16	70	66	+4	62
11	Lincoln City	46	14	20	12	47	47	0	62
12	Shrewsbury Town	46	17	8	21	52	61	−9	59
13	Fleetwood Town	46	14	16	16	53	51	+2	58

Source: EFL Official Website
Rules for classification: 1) Points; 2) Goal difference; 3) Number of goals scored; 4) Head-to-head results; 5) Wins; 6) Away goals; 7) Penalty points (sec 9.5); 8) 12-point sending off offences

==== Result summary ====
Overall								Home						Away					
Pld	W	D	L	GF	GA	GD	Pts	W	D	L	GF	GA	GD	W	D	L	GF	GA	GD
46	16	14	16	70	66	+4	62	9	7	7	44	31	+13	7	7	9	26	35	−9

Last updated: 7 May 2023.

==== Results by round ====
Round	1	2	3	4	5	6	7	8	9	10	11	12	13	14	15	16	17	18	19	20	21	22	23	24	25	26	27	28	29	30	31	32	33	34	35	36	37	38	39	40	41	42	43	44	45	46
Ground	A	H	A	H	H	A	A	H	A	A	H	A	H	H	A	H	H	A	A	H	H	H	A	A	H	H	H	A	H	A	A	H	A	A	H	A	A	H	H	A	H	A	A	H	H	A
Result	D	W	L	W	D	D	L	D	D	L	D	D	W	W	W	L	D	D	L	L	L	D	L	W	W	W	L	W	L	W	L	L	D	L	D	W	W	D	W	L	W	L	W	L	W	D
Position	10	5	14	6	6	8	12	14	14	16	16	18	11	10	7	8	9	11	14	17	18	17	18	17	12	12	15	12	12	11	11	14	13	16	16	12	11	12	12	12	10	11	10	11	10	10

Updated to match(es) played on 7 May 2023. Source:
A = Away; H = Home; W = Win; D = Draw; L = Loss

==== Matches ====
The 2022–23 season fixtures were released on Thursday 23 June 2022.

30 July 2022 1	Accrington Stanley	2–2	Charlton Athletic	Accrington
15:00 BST	McConville 69'; Adedoyin 90+6'	Report	Fraser 36'; Leaburn 90+4'	Stadium: Wham Stadium; Attendance: 2,767; Referee: Benjamin Speedie

6 August 2022 2	Charlton Athletic	1–0	Derby County	Charlton
15:00 BST	Blackett-Taylor 62'	Report		Stadium: The Valley; Attendance: 17,046; Referee: Chris Pollard

13 August 2022 3	Sheffield Wednesday	1–0	Charlton Athletic	Owlerton
15:00 BST	Bakinson 81'	Report		Stadium: Hillsborough Stadium; Attendance: 22,363; Referee: Robert Madden

16 August 2022 4	Charlton Athletic	5–1	Plymouth Argyle	Charlton
19:45 BST	Rak-Sakyi 11'; Stockley 41' (pen.); Clare 45+3'; Kirk 76'; Leaburn 84'	Report	Whittaker 71'	Stadium: The Valley; Attendance: 12,392; Referee: Sam Purkiss

20 August 2022 5	Charlton Athletic	1–1	Cambridge United	Charlton
15:00 BST	Fraser 41'	Report	Knibbs 60'	Stadium: The Valley; Attendance: 12,644; Referee: Carl Brook

27 August 2022 6	Wycombe Wanderers	1–1	Charlton Athletic	High Wycombe
15:00 BST	Mehmeti 14'	Report	Rak-Sakyi 15'	Stadium: Adams Park; Attendance: 6,139; Referee: David Rock

3 September 2022 7	Bolton Wanderers	3–1	Charlton Athletic	Horwich
15:00 BST	Bradley 9'; Lee 41'; Johnston 76'	Report	Fraser 4'	Stadium: University of Bolton Stadium; Attendance: 19,193; Referee: Tom Reeves

13 September 2022 8	Charlton Athletic	1–1	Forest Green Rovers	Charlton
19:45 BST	Blackett-Taylor 9'	Report	Wickham 45'	Stadium: The Valley; Attendance: 10,579; Referee: John Busby

17 September 2022 9	Fleetwood Town	1–1	Charlton Athletic	Fleetwood
15:00 BST	Morton 30'	Report	Leaburn 77'	Stadium: Highbury Stadium; Attendance: 3,614; Referee: Simon Mather

24 September 2022 10	Barnsley	3–1	Charlton Athletic	Barnsley
15:00 BST	Benson 10'; Norwood 54'; Cole 76'	Report	Payne 85'	Stadium: Oakwell; Attendance: 10,234; Referee: Adam Herczeg

1 October 2022 11	Charlton Athletic	1–1	Oxford United	Charlton
15:00 BST	Stockley 55'	Report	Browne 11'	Stadium: The Valley; Attendance: 12,806; Referee: Robert Madely

8 October 2022 12	Lincoln City	0–0	Charlton Athletic	Lincoln
15:00 BST		Report		Stadium: LNER Stadium; Attendance: 8,160; Referee: Robert Lewis

11 October 2022 13	Charlton Athletic	4–2	Exeter City	Charlton
19:45 BST	Leaburn 20'; Hartridge 24' (o.g.); Aneke 84'; Payne 90+1'	Report	Stansfield 37'; Nombe 90+5' (pen.)	Stadium: The Valley; Attendance: 11,411; Referee: Craig Hicks

17 October 2022 14	Charlton Athletic	3–0	Portsmouth	Charlton
20:00 BST	Inniss 17'; Blackett-Taylor 31'; O'Connell 67'	Report		Stadium: The Valley; Attendance: 13,456; Referee: Dean Whitestone
Note: Live on Sky Sports

22 October 2022 15	Shrewsbury Town	0–1	Charlton Athletic	Shrewsbury
15:00 BST		Report	Rak-Sakyi 69'	Stadium: Montgomery Waters Meadow; Attendance: 6,519; Referee: Sebastian Stockbridge

25 October 2022 16	Charlton Athletic	0–2	Milton Keynes Dons	Charlton
19:45 BST		Report	Grigg 66' (pen.); Johnson 78'	Stadium: The Valley; Attendance: 12,328; Referee: Neil Hair

29 October 2022 17	Charlton Athletic	4–4	Ipswich Town	Charlton
15:00 BST	Rak-Sakyi 63'; Morgan 76'; Thomas 90+6'; Dobson 90+9'	Report	Edmundson 45+3'; John-Jules 52'; Ladapo 90+1'; Morsy 90+4'	Stadium: The Valley; Attendance: 16,645; Referee: Josh Smith

12 November 2022 18	Burton Albion	3–3	Charlton Athletic	Burton upon Trent
15:00 GMT	Oshilaja 38'; Hamer 45'; Adeboyejo 58'	Report	Kirk 26', 36'; Rak-Sakyi 75'	Stadium: Pirelli Stadium; Attendance: 3,084; Referee: Will Finnie

19 November 2022 19	Port Vale	1–0	Charlton Athletic	Burslem
15:00 GMT	Butterworth 57'	Report		Stadium: Vale Park; Attendance: 7,604; Referee: Sam Barrott

2 December 2022 20	Charlton Athletic	0–1	Cheltenham Town	Charlton
19:45 GMT		Report	May 84'	Stadium: The Valley; Attendance: 12,566; Referee: Alan Young

17 December 2022 21	Charlton Athletic	1–2	Bristol Rovers	Charlton
15:00 GMT	Inniss 20'	Report	Marquis 61', 72'	Stadium: The Valley; Attendance: 12,340; Referee: Sam Allison

26 December 2022 22	Charlton Athletic	1–1	Peterborough United	Charlton
15:00 GMT	Leaburn 49'	Report	Clarke-Harris 65'	Stadium: The Valley; Attendance: 13,816; Referee: Darren Drysdale

29 December 2022 23	Oxford United	3–1	Charlton Athletic	Oxford
19:45 GMT	Bodin 20'; Taylor 24'; O'Donkor 82'	Report	Leaburn 67'	Stadium: Kassam Stadium; Attendance: 8,889; Referee: Ben Toner

1 January 2023 24	Portsmouth	1–3	Charlton Athletic	Portsmouth
15:00 GMT	Ogilvie 45+3'	Report	Rak-Sakyi 23'; Fraser 48'; Dale 90+4' (o.g.)	Stadium: Fratton Park; Attendance: 18,468; Referee: Tom Reeves

7 January 2023 25	Charlton Athletic	2–1	Lincoln City	Charlton
15:00 GMT	Fraser 35'; Blackett-Taylor 42'	Report	Mandroiu 76'	Stadium: The Valley; Attendance: 12,165; Referee: James Oldham

14 January 2023 26	Charlton Athletic	2–0	Barnsley	Charlton
15:00 GMT	Campbell 19'; Rak-Sakyi 61'	Report		Stadium: The Valley; Attendance: 13,266; Referee: Craig Hicks

28 January 2023 27	Charlton Athletic	1–2	Bolton Wanderers	Charlton
12:30 GMT	Morgan 46'	Report	Morley 4'; Charles 68'	Stadium: The Valley; Attendance: 14,458; Referee: Carl Brook
Note: Live on Sky Sports

4 February 2023 28	Exeter City	1–2	Charlton Athletic	Exeter
15:00 GMT	Mitchell 31'	Report	Rak-Sakyi 8'; Blackett-Taylor 18'	Stadium: St James Park; Attendance: 7,685; Referee: Declan Bourne

11 February 2023 29	Charlton Athletic	1–2	Fleetwood Town	Charlton
15:00 GMT	Rak-Sakyi 45+5'	Report	Rooney 28'; Holgate 52'	Stadium: The Valley; Attendance: 12,436; Referee: Carl Boyeson

14 February 2023 30	Forest Green Rovers	0–1	Charlton Athletic	Nailsworth
19:45 GMT		Report	Blackett-Taylor 12'	Stadium: The Fully Charged New Lawn; Attendance: 2,670; Referee: Chris Pollard

18 February 2023 31	Derby County	2–0	Charlton Athletic	Derby
15:00 GMT	McGoldrick 9' (pen.); Cashin 69'	Report		Stadium: Pride Park Stadium; Attendance: 27,460; Referee: Paul Howard

25 February 2023 32	Charlton Athletic	0–1	Sheffield Wednesday	Charlton
15:00 GMT		Report	Palmer 9'	Stadium: The Valley; Attendance: 16,729; Referee: Benjamin Speedie

28 February 2023 33	Peterborough United	0–0	Charlton Athletic	Peterborough
19:45 GMT		Report		Stadium: Weston Homes Stadium; Attendance: 8,290; Referee: Andrew Kitchen

4 March 2023 34	Plymouth Argyle	2–0	Charlton Athletic	Plymouth
15:00 GMT	Hardie 46'; Ennis 87'	Report		Stadium: Home Park; Attendance: 16,011; Referee: Andy Woolmer

11 March 2023 35	Charlton Athletic	1–1	Accrington Stanley	Charlton
15:00 GMT	Sessegnon 37'	Report	Whalley 28'	Stadium: The Valley; Attendance: 11,972; Referee: Darren Drysdale

14 March 2023 36	Morecambe	1–4	Charlton Athletic	Morecambe
19:45 GMT	Love 61'	Report	Leaburn 17'; Blackett-Taylor 21', 43'; Fraser 69'	Stadium: The Mazuma Stadium; Attendance: 3,795; Referee: Andy Haines

18 March 2023 37	Cambridge United	1–2	Charlton Athletic	Cambridge
15:00 GMT	Jones 72'	Report	Leaburn 14'; Rak-Sakyi 28'	Stadium: Abbey Stadium; Attendance: 7,068; Referee: Marc Edwards

25 March 2023 38	Charlton Athletic	1–1	Wycombe Wanderers	Charlton
15:00 GMT	Leaburn 16'	Report	Forino-Joseph 82'	Stadium: The Valley; Attendance: 15,278; Referee: Scott Oldham

1 April 2023 39	Charlton Athletic	6–0	Shrewsbury Town	Charlton
15:00 BST	Fraser 27'; Morgan 38'; Rak-Sakyi 45+2'; Leaburn 61', 70' (pen.); Bonne 90+2'	Report		Stadium: The Valley; Attendance: 13,241; Referee: Robert Madley

7 April 2023 40	Bristol Rovers	1–0	Charlton Athletic	Bristol
15:00 BST	Marquis 71' (pen.)	Report		Stadium: Memorial Stadium; Attendance: 9,613; Referee: Simon Mather

10 April 2023 41	Charlton Athletic	3–2	Burton Albion	Charlton
15:00 BST	Rak-Sakyi 7', 17'; Bonne 50'	Report	Hughes 45+2'; Walker 76'	Stadium: The Valley; Attendance: 12,788; Referee: Sunny Sukhvir Gill

15 April 2023 42	Ipswich Town	6–0	Charlton Athletic	Ipswich
15:00 BST	Chaplin 7', 14', 30'; Ladapo 75', 84'; Davis 90+5'	Report		Stadium: Portman Road; Attendance: 29,011; Referee: Sam Barrott

18 April 2023 43	Milton Keynes Dons	0–1	Charlton Athletic	Milton Keynes
19:45 BST		Report	Payne 61'	Stadium: Stadium MK; Attendance: 6,600; Referee: Sam Allison

22 April 2023 44	Charlton Athletic	2–3	Morecambe	Charlton
15:00 BST	Rak-Sakyi 45+1'; Fraser 79'	Report	Stockton 8', 57'; Weir 64'	Stadium: The Valley; Attendance: 13,347; Referee: David Rock

29 April 2023 45	Charlton Athletic	3–2	Port Vale	Charlton
15:00 BST	Campbell 14'; Rak-Sakyi 58'; Leaburn 77'	Report	Plant 62'; Taylor 90+7' (pen.)	Stadium: The Valley; Attendance: 15,314; Referee: Carl Brook

7 May 2023 46	Cheltenham Town	2–2	Charlton Athletic	Cheltenham
12:00 BST	Keena 50'; May 88'	Report	Fraser 34'; Payne 83'	Stadium: Completely-Suzuki Stadium; Attendance: 5,336; Referee: Tom Nield

=== FA Cup ===
The first round draw was made on Monday 17 October 2022. On Friday 21 October 2022, the club confirmed the date of their first round fixture. The second round draw was made on Monday 7 November 2022. On 15 November 2022, the club announced the date for their second-round match. The second round replay date was confirmed on Monday 28 November 2022. The third round draw was also made on Monday 28 November 2022, should they progress after their second round replay.

5 November 2022 First round	Charlton Athletic	4–1	Coalville Town	Charlton
15:00 GMT	Payne 24', 81'; Stockley 45+3'; Aneke 90'	Report	Chambers 52'	Stadium: The Valley; Attendance: 4,707; Referee: Lewis Smith

26 November 2022 Second round	Charlton Athletic	2–2	Stockport County	Charlton
15:00 GMT	Lewis 23' (o.g.); Morgan 39'	Report	Hussey 3'; Hippolyte 90+7'	Stadium: The Valley; Attendance: 3,889; Referee: Lee Swabey

7 December 2022 Second round replay	Stockport County	3–1	Charlton Athletic	Edgeley
19:45 GMT	Collar 25', 73', 81' (pen.)	Report	Wright 7' (o.g.)	Stadium: Edgeley Park; Attendance: 6,242; Referee: Scott Oldham
Note: Live on ITV4

=== EFL Cup ===
The first round draw was made on Thursday 23 June 2022. On Tuesday 5 July 2022, the club confirmed the date of their first round fixture. The second round draw was made on Wednesday 10 August 2022. The third round draw was made on Wednesday 24 August 2022. On Monday 12 September 2022, the club confirmed the date of their third round fixture. The fourth round draw was made on Thursday 10 November 2022. On Thursday 24 November 2022, the club confirmed the date of their fourth round fixture. The quarter-finals draw was made on Thursday 22 December 2022. On Tuesday 27 December 2022, the club confirmed the date of their quarter-finals fixture.

9 August 2022 First round	Charlton Athletic	1–1 (5–3 p)	Queens Park Rangers	Charlton
19:45 BST	Henry 90'	Report	Roberts 80'	Stadium: The Valley; Attendance: 5,629; Referee: Stuart Attwell
	Penalties
	Stockley (penalty scored); Kirk (penalty scored); Morgan (penalty scored); Henry (penalty scored); O'Connell (penalty scored)		Johansen (penalty missed); Roberts (penalty scored); Shodipo (penalty scored); Dozzell (penalty scored)

23 August 2022 Second round	Walsall	0–1	Charlton Athletic	Walsall
19:00 BST		Report	Jaiyesimi 57'	Stadium: Poundland Bescot Stadium; Attendance: 2,954; Referee: Ollie Yates

8 November 2022 Third round	Stevenage	1–1 (4–5 p)	Charlton Athletic	Stevenage
19:45 GMT	Norris 22' (pen.)	Report	Aneke 87'	Stadium: Lamex Stadium; Attendance: 3,515; Referee: Tom Nield
	Penalties
	Rose (penalty scored); Campbell (penalty scored); Sweeney (penalty scored); Bostwick (penalty scored); Taylor (penalty missed)		Clare (penalty scored); Forster-Caskey (penalty scored); Rak-Sakyi (penalty scored); Aneke (penalty scored); Fraser (penalty scored)

21 December 2022 Fourth round	Charlton Athletic	0–0 (4–3 p)	Brighton & Hove Albion	Charlton
19:45 GMT		Report		Stadium: The Valley; Attendance: 17,464; Referee: Thomas Bramall
	Penalties
	Stockley (penalty missed); Forster-Caskey (penalty scored); Dobson (penalty missed); Rak-Sakyi (penalty missed); Blackett-Taylor (penalty scored); Sessegnon (penalty scored); Lavelle (penalty scored)		Groß (penalty missed); Trossard (penalty missed); Ferguson (penalty scored); Dunk (penalty scored); March (penalty missed); Lamptey (penalty scored); Caicedo (penalty missed)

10 January 2023 Quarter-finals	Manchester United	3–0	Charlton Athletic	Trafford
20:00 GMT	Antony 21'; Rashford 90', 90+4'	Report		Stadium: Old Trafford; Attendance: 74,345; Referee: Jarred Gillett

=== EFL Trophy ===
The regional group stage draw was confirmed on Monday 20 June 2022 and saw Charlton Athletic placed in Southern Group A, alongside Colchester United and Gillingham. On Thursday 23 June 2022, it was confirmed that the final team in the group would be Brighton & Hove Albion U21. On Thursday 7 July 2022, the club announced the dates of their EFL Trophy Southern Group A fixtures. On Friday 11 November 2022, the draw for the second round of the EFL Trophy was made on Sky Sports. On 15 November 2022, the club announced the date for their second round EFL Trophy match.

Pos	Div	Team	Pld	W	PW	PL	L	GF	GA	GD	Pts	Qualification
1	L2	Colchester United	3	2	0	1	0	5	3	+2	7	Advance to Round 2
2	L1	Charlton Athletic	3	2	0	0	1	6	3	+3	6	Advance to Round 2
3	L2	Gillingham	3	1	1	0	1	4	6	−2	5	
4	ACA	Brighton & Hove Albion U21	3	0	0	0	3	4	7	−3	0	

Source: EFL.com

31 August 2022 Group stage 1	Charlton Athletic	3–0	Gillingham	Charlton
19:00 BST	Walker 15' (o.g.); Henry 52'; Leaburn 59'	Report		Stadium: The Valley; Attendance: 1,888; Referee: Sunny Gill

4 October 2022 Group stage 2	Colchester United	2–1	Charlton Athletic	Colchester
19:45 BST	Eastman 86'; Akinde 90+1'	Report	Morgan 17'	Stadium: JobServe Community Stadium; Attendance: 880; Referee: Lee Swabey

2 November 2022 Group stage 3	Charlton Athletic	2–1	Brighton & Hove Albion U21	Charlton
19:00 GMT	Lavelle 45'; Payne 90+2'	Report	Miller 54'	Stadium: The Valley; Attendance: 662; Referee: Paul Howard

22 November 2022 Second round	Plymouth Argyle	3–2	Charlton Athletic	Plymouth
19:00 GMT	Cosgrove 13'; Ennis 15'; Roberts 46'	Report	Kanu 8'; Anderson 90+1'	Stadium: Home Park; Attendance: 1,394; Referee: Robert Lewis

=== London Senior Cup ===
12 October 2022 First round	Phoenix Sports	0–6	Charlton Athletic	Barnehurst
19:45 BST		Report	Gavin 17'; Adigun 38'; Toure 64'; Campbell 76'; Ladapo 78', 90'	Stadium: Phoenix Sports Ground; Attendance: 177; Referee: William Donnelly

4 April 2023 Second round	Welling United	1–1 (2–4 p)	Charlton Athletic	Welling
19:00 BST	Papadopoulos 86'	Report	Bakrin 66'	Stadium: Park View Road; Attendance: 461; Referee: George Warren
	Penalties
	Kassarate (penalty scored); Papadopoulos (penalty missed); Kane (penalty scored); Bayford (penalty missed)		Ladapo (penalty scored); Santos (penalty missed); Anderson (penalty scored); Williams (penalty scored); Adigun (penalty scored)

18 April 2023 Quarter-finals	Barking	0–5	Charlton Athletic	Dagenham
19:45 BST		Report	Williams 20'; Asiimwe 50'; Enslin 87', 90+1'; Huke 90+3'	Stadium: Mayesbrook Park; Attendance: 83; Referee: Richard Myers

26 April 2023 Semi-finals	Charlton Athletic	4–2	Hendon	Dartford
19:00 BST	Gavin 12', 72' (pen.); Kamara 66'; Rylah 68'	Report	Keita 29'; Muir 42'	Stadium: Princes Park; Attendance: 130; Referee: Morgan Conn

2 May 2023 Final	Charlton Athletic	5–3 (aet, 3–3 at 90 mins)	Haringey Borough	Kingsbury
19:45 BST	Kanu 13', 41'; Gavin 19'; Mitchell 96'; Kedwell 115'	Report	Allen 45+1', 57'; Young 87'	Stadium: Silver Jubilee Park; Attendance: 487; Referee: Lawrence Torz-Brown
