= 2021–22 Charlton Athletic F.C. season =

Charlton Athletic
2021–22 season
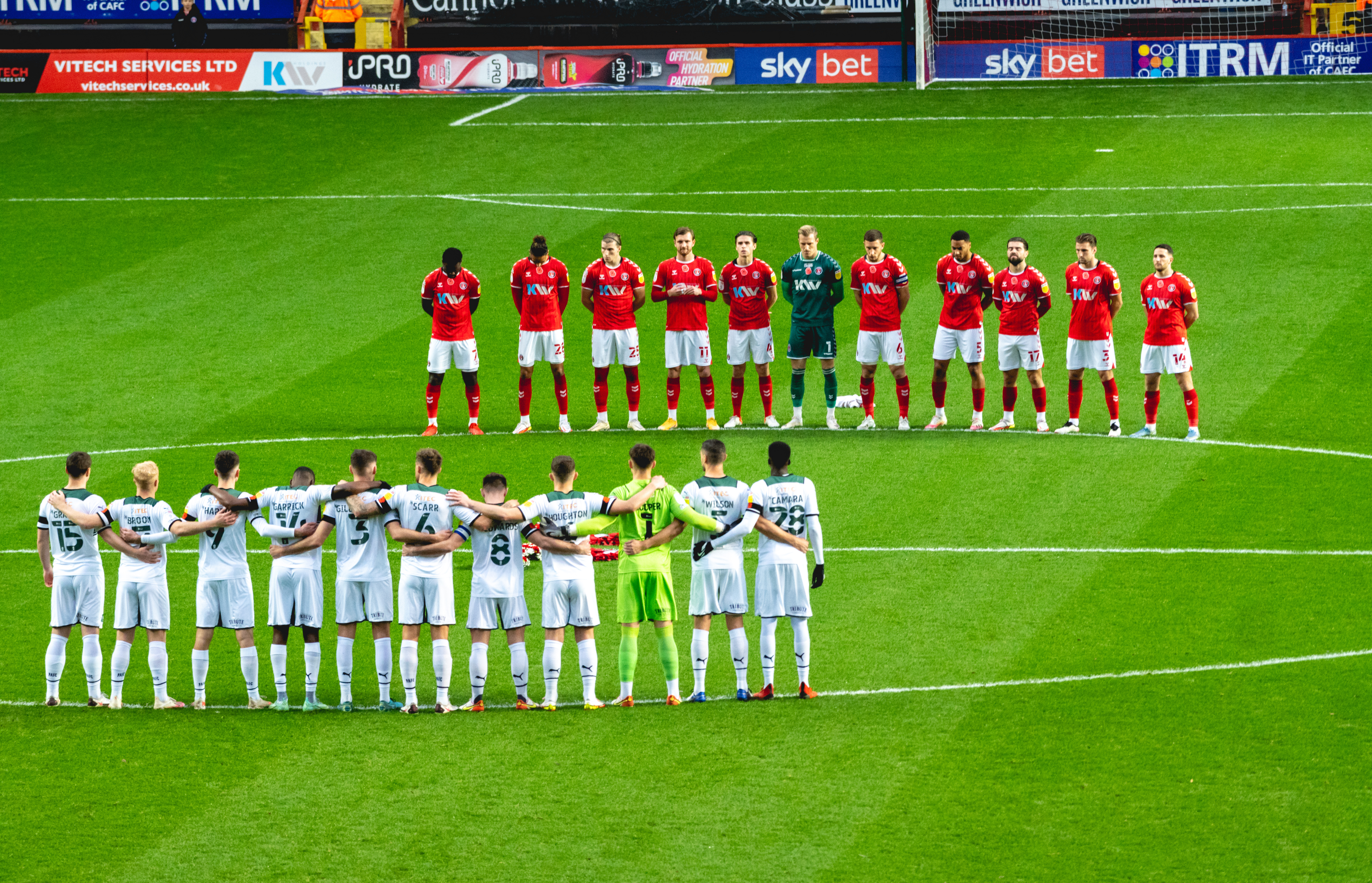
- Charlton players before a game against Plymouth Argyle
- Chairman: Thomas Sandgaard
- Manager: Nigel Adkins (until 21 October 2021); Johnnie Jackson (caretaker) (from 21 October 2021 until 17 December 2021, permanent manager until 3 May 2022)
- Stadium: The Valley
- League One: 13th
- FA Cup: Third round (vs. Norwich City)
- EFL Cup: First round (vs. AFC Wimbledon)
- EFL Trophy: Quarter-finals (vs. Hartlepool United)
- Top goalscorer: League: Jayden Stockley (13); All: Jayden Stockley (20)
- Highest home attendance: 26,376 (vs. Ipswich Town, 7 December 2021)
- Lowest home attendance: 689 (vs. Southampton U21, 5 October 2021)
- Average home league attendance: 15,592
Home colours	Away colours	Third colours

The 2021–22 Charlton Athletic season was the club's 116th season in their existence, having been founded in 1905, and their second back in League One following relegation from the Championship in 2020. Along with competing in League One, the club also participated in the FA Cup, EFL Cup and the EFL Trophy. The season covered the period from 1 July 2021 to 30 June 2022.

== Kit ==
Sportswear manufacturers Hummel were Kit suppliers. with sponsorship of Home and third shirts being KW Holdings whilst the away shirt sponsor was the Walker Mower Partnership.

== Squad statistics ==
As of 30 April 2022

No.	Pos	Nat	Player	Total		League One		FA Cup		League Cup		EFL Trophy	
No.	Pos	Nat	Player	Apps	Goals	Apps	Goals	Apps	Goals	Apps	Goals	Apps	Goals
1	GK	(Scotland) SCO	Craig MacGillivray	45	0	43+0	0	0+0	0	1+0	0	1+0	0
2	DF	(Wales) WAL	Chris Gunter	22	0	17+1	0	0+1	0	1+0	0	2+0	0
3	DF	(England) ENG	Ben Purrington	31	4	24+3	3	2+0	0	0+0	0	2+0	1
4	MF	(England) ENG	George Dobson	43	1	38+0	1	2+0	0	0+1	0	2+0	0
5	DF	(England) ENG	Akin Famewo (on loan from Norwich City)	40	1	34+3	1	2+0	0	0+0	0	1+0	0
6	DF	(England) ENG	Jason Pearce	28	1	20+3	0	1+0	0	1+0	0	3+0	1
7	MF	(England) ENG	Diallang Jaiyesimi	36	2	22+11	2	2+0	0	0+0	0	1+0	0
8	MF	(England) ENG	Jake Forster-Caskey	4	0	1+3	0	0+0	0	0+0	0	0+0	0
9	FW	(England) ENG	Jayden Stockley	38	20	28+5	13	2+0	4	0+1	0	2+0	3
10	MF	(England) ENG	Albie Morgan	29	1	21+1	1	1+1	0	1+0	0	4+0	0
11	MF	(England) ENG	Alex Gilbey	40	3	32+5	2	2+0	0	0+0	0	1+0	1
12	MF	(England) ENG	Nile John (on loan from Tottenham Hotspur)	0	0	0+0	0	0+0	0	0+0	0	0+0	0
13	GK	(Australia) AUS	Ashley Maynard-Brewer	0	0	0+0	0	0+0	0	0+0	0	0+0	0
14	FW	(Northern Ireland) NIR	Conor Washington	38	11	28+7	11	1+1	0	0+0	0	1+0	0
15	DF	(Scotland) SCO	Samuel Lavelle	19	2	18+1	2	0+0	0	0+0	0	0+0	0
16	DF	(Wales) WAL	Adam Matthews	31	0	28+0	0	0+0	0	0+0	0	3+0	0
17	FW	(England) ENG	Elliot Lee (on loan from Luton Town)	39	4	26+8	3	2+1	0	0+0	0	1+1	1
18	FW	(England) ENG	Jonathan Leko (on loan from Birmingham City)	30	3	15+10	2	1+1	0	0+0	0	2+1	1
19	DF	(Netherlands) NED	Juan Castillo (on loan from Chelsea)	3	0	1+1	0	0+0	0	0+0	0	0+1	0
20	MF	(England) ENG	Charlie Kirk	14	0	5+3	0	1+1	0	0+0	0	3+1	0
21	MF	(Scotland) SCO	Scott Fraser	9	0	6+3	0	0+0	0	0+0	0	0+0	0
22	MF	(Republic of Ireland) IRL	Harry Arter (on loan from Nottingham Forest)	6	0	4+0	0	1+0	0	0+0	0	1+0	0
22	FW	(England) ENG	Chuks Aneke	10	4	4+5	4	0+0	0	0+0	0	0+1	0
23	MF	(England) ENG	Corey Blackett-Taylor	34	3	15+12	2	1+1	0	0+0	0	2+3	1
24	DF	(England) ENG	Ryan Inniss	17	1	12+3	1	1+0	0	0+0	0	1+0	0
25	FW	(England) ENG	Josh Davison	23	5	9+6	2	1+2	1	1+0	0	2+2	2
26	MF	(England) ENG	Ben Watson	14	0	6+3	0	0+1	0	1+0	0	3+0	0
27	DF	(Senegal) SEN	Pape Souaré	13	0	7+2	0	1+1	0	0+0	0	2+0	0
28	DF	(England) ENG	Sean Clare	43	1	31+5	1	3+0	0	1+0	0	2+1	0
30	GK	(Republic of Ireland) IRL	Stephen Henderson	5	0	2+0	0	3+0	0	0+0	0	0+0	0
31	GK	(England) ENG	Nathan Harness	6	0	1+0	0	0+0	0	0+0	0	5+0	0
32	FW	(Lebanon) LBN	Hady Ghandour	1	0	0+0	0	0+0	0	1+0	0	0+0	0
33	MF	(England) ENG	Ben Dempsey	4	0	0+0	0	0+0	0	0+0	0	1+3	0
34	FW	(Algeria) ALG	Wassim Aouachria	1	0	0+0	0	0+0	0	0+0	0	0+1	0
35	MF	(England) ENG	James Vennings	0	0	0+0	0	0+0	0	0+0	0	0+0	0
36	MF	(England) ENG	Charles Clayden	8	0	0+2	0	0+1	0	1+0	0	3+1	0
37	MF	(England) ENG	Johl Powell	2	0	0+0	0	0+0	0	0+1	0	0+1	0
38	DF	(Scotland) SCO	Harris O’Connor	0	0	0+0	0	0+0	0	0+0	0	0+0	0
39	GK	(England) ENG	Nathan Harvey	0	0	0+0	0	0+0	0	0+0	0	0+0	0
40	DF	(England) ENG	Charlie Barker	1	0	0+0	0	0+0	0	0+0	0	1+0	0
41	FW	(Wales) WAL	Ryan Viggars	1	0	0+0	0	0+0	0	0+0	0	0+1	0
42	MF	(England) ENG	Aaron Henry	3	0	0+0	0	0+0	0	0+0	0	2+1	0
43	FW	(Republic of Ireland) IRL	Dylan Gavin	0	0	0+0	0	0+0	0	0+0	0	0+0	0
44	DF	(England) ENG	Richard Chin	1	0	0+0	0	0+0	0	0+0	0	1+0	0
45	GK	(England) ENG	James Beadle	0	0	0+0	0	0+0	0	0+0	0	0+0	0
45	MF	(Northern Ireland) NIR	Euan Williams	1	0	0+0	0	0+0	0	0+0	0	0+1	0
46	DF	(England) ENG	Nazir Bakrin	2	0	0+0	0	0+0	0	0+0	0	2+0	0
47	MF	(Jamaica) JAM	Karoy Anderson	0	0	0+0	0	0+0	0	0+0	0	0+0	0
48	FW	(England) ENG	Mason Burstow (on loan from Chelsea)	23	6	8+8	2	1+1	1	0+0	0	4+1	3
49	DF	(England) ENG	Jacob Roddy	2	0	0+0	0	0+0	0	1+0	0	1+0	0
50	DF	(England) ENG	Deji Elerewe	11	0	0+3	0	2+0	0	1+0	0	4+1	0
51	DF	(England) ENG	Lucas Ness	1	0	0+0	0	0+0	0	0+0	0	0+1	0
52	FW	(Sierra Leone) SLE	Daniel Kanu	2	0	0+2	0	0+0	0	0+0	0	0+0	0
53	MF	(Jamaica) JAM	Tyreece Campbell	2	0	0+2	0	0+0	0	0+0	0	0+0	0
54	FW	(England) ENG	Miles Leaburn	0	0	0+0	0	0+0	0	0+0	0	0+0	0

=== Top scorers ===
As of 30 April 2022

Place	Position	Nation	Number	Name	League One	FA Cup	League Cup	EFL Trophy	Total
1	FW	(England)	9	Jayden Stockley	13	4	0	3	20
2	FW	(Northern Ireland)	14	Conor Washington	11	0	0	0	11
3	FW	(England)	48	Mason Burstow	2	1	0	3	6
4	FW	(England)	25	Josh Davison	2	1	0	2	5
5	FW	(England)	22	Chuks Aneke	4	0	0	0	4
=	DF	(England)	3	Ben Purrington	3	0	0	1	4
=	FW	(England)	17	Elliot Lee	3	0	0	1	4
8	FW	(England)	18	Jonathan Leko	2	0	0	1	3
=	MF	(England)	11	Alex Gilbey	2	0	0	1	3
=	MF	(England)	23	Corey Blackett-Taylor	2	0	0	1	3
11	DF	(Scotland)	15	Samuel Lavelle	2	0	0	0	2
=	MF	(England)	7	Diallang Jaiyesimi	2	0	0	0	2
13	DF	(England)	28	Sean Clare	1	0	0	0	1
=	MF	(England)	10	Albie Morgan	1	0	0	0	1
=	DF	(England)	24	Ryan Inniss	1	0	0	0	1
=	DF	(England)	5	Akin Famewo	1	0	0	0	1
=	MF	(England)	4	George Dobson	1	0	0	0	1
=	DF	(England)	6	Jason Pearce	0	0	0	1	1
Own goals					2	0	0	1	3
Totals					55	6	0	15	76

=== Disciplinary record ===
As of 30 April 2022

Number	Nation	Position	Name	League One		FA Cup		League Cup		EFL Trophy		Total	
Number	Nation	Position	Name	Booked	Sent off (straight red)	Booked	Sent off (straight red)	Booked	Sent off (straight red)	Booked	Sent off (straight red)	Booked	Sent off (straight red)
4	(England)	MF	George Dobson	13	0	1	0	1	0	1	0	16	0
11	(England)	MF	Alex Gilbey	9	1	1	0	0	0	0	0	10	1
5	(England)	DF	Akin Famewo	10	0	0	0	0	0	0	0	10	0
3	(England)	DF	Ben Purrington	8	0	1	0	0	0	1	0	10	0
28	(England)	DF	Sean Clare	8	1	1	0	0	0	0	0	9	1
9	(England)	FW	Jayden Stockley	7	1	0	0	1	0	0	0	8	1
6	(England)	DF	Jason Pearce	6	0	0	0	0	0	2	0	8	0
24	(England)	DF	Ryan Inniss	5	1	1	0	0	0	0	0	6	1
7	(England)	MF	Diallang Jaiyesimi	6	0	0	0	0	0	0	0	6	0
14	(Northern Ireland)	FW	Conor Washington	5	0	0	0	0	0	0	0	5	0
10	(England)	MF	Albie Morgan	3	0	0	0	0	0	2	0	5	0
2	(Wales)	DF	Chris Gunter	4	0	0	0	0	0	0	0	4	0
27	(Senegal)	DF	Pape Souaré	4	0	0	0	0	0	0	0	4	0
22	(England)	FW	Chuks Aneke	3	0	0	0	0	0	1	0	4	0
18	(England)	FW	Jonathan Leko	3	0	0	0	0	0	0	0	3	0
17	(England)	FW	Elliot Lee	3	0	0	0	0	0	0	0	3	0
15	(Scotland)	DF	Samuel Lavelle	2	0	0	0	0	0	0	0	2	0
22	(Republic of Ireland)	MF	Harry Arter	2	0	0	0	0	0	0	0	2	0
26	(England)	MF	Ben Watson	1	0	0	0	0	0	1	0	2	0
50	(England)	DF	Deji Elerewe	0	0	2	0	0	0	0	0	2	0
16	(Wales)	DF	Adam Matthews	1	0	0	0	0	0	0	0	1	0
25	(England)	FW	Josh Davison	1	0	0	0	0	0	0	0	1	0
20	(England)	MF	Charlie Kirk	1	0	0	0	0	0	0	0	1	0
52	(Sierra Leone)	FW	Daniel Kanu	1	0	0	0	0	0	0	0	1	0
23	(England)	MF	Corey Blackett-Taylor	1	0	0	0	0	0	0	0	1	0
36	(England)	MF	Charles Clayden	0	0	0	0	0	0	1	0	1	0
44	(England)	DF	Richard Chin	0	0	0	0	0	0	1	0	1	0
Totals				107	4	7	0	2	0	10	0	126	4

== Transfers ==
=== Transfers in ===
Date from	Position	Nationality	Name	From	Fee	Ref.
1 July 2021	CM	(England)	George Dobson	(England) Sunderland	Free transfer	
1 July 2021	GK	(Scotland)	Craig MacGillivray	(England) Portsmouth	Free transfer	
1 July 2021	CF	(England)	Jayden Stockley	(England) Preston North End	Undisclosed	
5 July 2021	LB	(England)	Jacob Roddy	(England) Bradfield College	Undisclosed	
5 July 2021	CF	(Wales)	Ryan Viggars	(England) Sheffield United	Undisclosed	
20 July 2021	DF	(England)	Sean Clare	(England) Oxford United	Undisclosed	
12 August 2021	LW	(England)	Charlie Kirk	(England) Crewe Alexandra	Undisclosed	
20 August 2021	LW	(England)	Corey Blackett-Taylor	(England) Tranmere Rovers	Free transfer	
31 August 2021	CB	(Scotland)	Samuel Lavelle	(England) Morecambe	Undisclosed	
6 September 2021	LB	(Senegal)	Pape Souaré	Free Agent	—N/a	
7 September 2021	GK	(Republic of Ireland)	Stephen Henderson	(England) Crystal Palace	Free transfer	
1 November 2021	DF	(Scotland)	Harris O'Connor	(Scotland) Rangers	Free transfer	
14 January 2022	CF	(England)	Chuks Aneke	(England) Birmingham City	Undisclosed	
31 January 2022	AM	(Scotland)	Scott Fraser	(England) Ipswich Town	Undisclosed	

=== Transfers out ===
Date from	Position	Nationality	Name	To	Fee	Ref.
1 July 2021	CF	(England)	Richard Afrane-Kesey	(England) Braintree Town	Released	
1 July 2021	DF	(England)	Kasim Aidoo	(England) Eastbourne Borough	Released	
1 July 2021	AM	(England)	Eddie Allsopp	(England) Barking	Released	
1 July 2021	GK	(England)	Ben Amos	(England) Wigan Athletic	Free transfer	
1 July 2021	CF	(England)	Chuks Aneke	(England) Birmingham City	Free transfer	
1 July 2021	DF	(England)	Freddy Barton	(England) Bowers & Pitsea	Released	
1 July 2021	DF	(England)	Harry Beadle	(England) Colchester United	Free transfer	
1 July 2021	AM	(England)	Marcus Maddison	(England) Spalding United	Released	
1 July 2021	DM	(England)	Jay Mingi	(England) Portsmouth	Released	
1 July 2021	CB	(England)	Deji Oshilaja	(England) Burton Albion	Released	
1 July 2021	AM	(Turkey)	Erhun Oztumer	(Turkey) Fatih Karagümrük	Released	
1 July 2021	CM	(England)	Darren Pratley	(England) Leyton Orient	Released	
1 July 2021	MF	(Guinea-Bissau)	Junior Quitirna	(Republic of Ireland) Waterford	Released	
1 July 2021	CM	(Scotland)	Andrew Shinnie	(Scotland) Livingston	Released	
1 July 2021	DF	(England)	Harry Taylor	(England) Maldon & Tiptree	Released	
1 July 2021	DF	(England)	Luca Vega	Free agent	Released	
12 October 2021	CF	(Denmark)	Ronnie Schwartz	(Denmark) Vendsyssel	Released	
13 January 2022	GK	(England)	James Beadle	(England) Brighton & Hove Albion	Undisclosed	
31 January 2022	CF	(England)	Mason Burstow	(England) Chelsea	Undisclosed	

=== Loans in ===
Date from	Position	Nationality	Name	From	Date until	Ref.
8 July 2021	CB	(England)	Akin Famewo	(England) Norwich City	End of season	
26 August 2021	CF	(England)	Elliot Lee	(England) Luton Town	End of season	
31 August 2021	CM	(Republic of Ireland)	Harry Arter	(England) Nottingham Forest	4 January 2022	
31 August 2021	RW	(England)	Jonathan Leko	(England) Birmingham City	End of season	
21 January 2022	LB	(Netherlands)	Juan Castillo	(England) Chelsea	End of season	
27 January 2022	CM	(England)	Nile John	(England) Tottenham Hotspur	End of season	
31 January 2022	CF	(England)	Mason Burstow	(England) Chelsea	End of season	

=== Loans out ===
Date from	Position	Nationality	Name	To	Date until	Ref.
6 August 2021	GK	(Australia)	Ashley Maynard-Brewer	(Scotland) Ross County	End of season	
31 August 2021	CF	(Algeria)	Wassim Aouachria	(England) Aldershot Town	24 October 2021	
24 September 2021	DF	(England)	Charlie Barker	(England) Wealdstone	23 October 2021	
4 October 2021	MF	(England)	James Vennings	(England) Aldershot Town	31 December 2021	
21 October 2021	FW	(Lebanon)	Hady Ghandour	(England) Maidstone United	20 November 2021	
14 December 2021	CF	(Algeria)	Wassim Aouachria	(England) Braintree Town	3 January 2022	
7 January 2022	FW	(Lebanon)	Hady Ghandour	(England) Chelmsford City	31 January 2022	
21 January 2022	FW	(Republic of Ireland)	Dylan Gavin	(England) Billericay Town	End of season	
22 January 2022	GK	(England)	Nathan Harness	(England) Dulwich Hamlet	19 February 2022	
24 January 2022	MF	(England)	Ben Dempsey	(Scotland) Ayr United	End of season	
24 January 2022	FW	(England)	Josh Davison	(England) Swindon Town	End of season	
25 January 2022	DF	(England)	Nazir Bakrin	(England) Cray Wanderers	30 March 2022	
27 January 2022	LW	(England)	Charlie Kirk	(England) Blackpool	End of season	
4 February 2022	MF	(England)	Aaron Henry	(England) Wealdstone	End of season	
5 February 2022	MF	(England)	James Vennings	(England) Aldershot Town	4 March 2022	
11 February 2022	DF	(England)	Lucas Ness	(England) Hampton & Richmond Borough	End of season	
18 February 2022	MF	(England)	Charles Clayden	(England) Wealdstone	End of season	
22 February 2022	MF	(England)	Johl Powell	(England) Maidstone United	End of season	
11 March 2022	FW	(Lebanon)	Hady Ghandour	(England) Maidstone United	End of season	
15 March 2022	MF	(England)	James Vennings	(England) Bromley	End of season	
18 March 2022	CF	(Algeria)	Wassim Aouachria	(England) Hampton & Richmond Borough	End of season	

== Friendlies ==
On 25 May 2021, Charlton Athletic announced its first confirmed friendlies taking place ahead of the 2021/22 season would be against Celtic at Celtic Manor Resort in Newport in a behind-closed-doors fixture, and against Dartford at Princes Park in Dartford. On 8 June 2021, Charlton Athletic confirmed a third friendly against Reading in a behind-closed-doors fixture. On 11 June a fourth friendly was announced against Crystal Palace taking place at Selhurst Park. A fifth friendly was added on 8 July which would see Charlton travel to Craven Cottage to face Fulham. Also on 8 July, a sixth friendly was added against Welling United at Park View Road.

10 July 2021 Friendly	Celtic	2–1	Charlton Athletic	Newport
15:00 BST	Dembele 24'; Ajeti 40'	Report	Washington 77'	Stadium: Dragon Park; Attendance: 0

13 July 2021 Friendly	Welling United	0–3	Charlton Athletic	Welling
19:30 BST		Report	Jaiyesimi 12'; Clayden 25'; Henry 57'	Stadium: Park View Road; Attendance: 1,152; Referee: Simon Finnigan

17 July 2021 Friendly	Dartford	1–2	Charlton Athletic	Dartford
15:00 BST	Graham 52'	Report	Jaiyesimi 50'; Davison 66'	Stadium: Princes Park; Attendance: 2,000; Referee: Rob Whitton

24 July 2021 Friendly	Reading	1–1	Charlton Athletic	Reading
14:00 BST	Ejaria 38'	Report	Ghandour 80'	Stadium: Select Car Leasing Stadium; Attendance: 0 Referee: Dermot Gallagher

27 July 2021 Friendly	Crystal Palace	2–2	Charlton Athletic	Selhurst
18:00 BST	Rak-Sakyi 15'; Banks 75'	Report	Stockley 38'; Davison 79'	Stadium: Selhurst Park

31 July 2021 Friendly	Fulham	1–0	Charlton Athletic	Fulham
15:00 BST	Carvalho 32'	Report		Stadium: Craven Cottage; Referee: Gavin Ward

== Competitions ==
=== League One ===
==== League table ====
Pos	Team	Pld	W	D	L	GF	GA	GD	Pts
9	Bolton Wanderers	46	21	10	15	74	57	+17	73
10	Portsmouth	46	20	13	13	68	51	+17	73
11	Ipswich Town	46	18	16	12	67	46	+21	70
12	Accrington Stanley	46	17	10	19	61	80	−19	61
13	Charlton Athletic	46	17	8	21	55	59	−4	59
14	Cambridge United	46	15	13	18	56	74	−18	58
15	Cheltenham Town	46	13	17	16	66	80	−14	56
16	Burton Albion	46	14	11	21	51	67	−16	53
17	Lincoln City	46	14	10	22	55	63	−8	52

Source: EFL Official Website
Rules for classification: 1) Points; 2) Goal difference; 3) Number of goals scored; 4) Head-to-head results; 5) Wins; 6) Away goals; 7) Penalty points based on yellow and red cards received excluding the last four games of the season (sec 9.5); 8) 12-point sending off offences; 9) If the tie affects the automatic promotion or relegation places, a play-off game or games would be held between the two tied teams

==== Result summary ====
Overall								Home						Away					
Pld	W	D	L	GF	GA	GD	Pts	W	D	L	GF	GA	GD	W	D	L	GF	GA	GD
46	17	8	21	55	59	−4	59	10	4	9	32	28	+4	7	4	12	23	31	−8

Last updated: 230 April 2022.

==== Results by round ====
Round	1	2	3	4	5	6	7	8	9	10	11	12	13	14	15	16	17	18	19	20	21	22	23	24	25	26	27	28	29	30	31	32	33	34	35	36	37	38	39	40	41	42	43	44	45	46
Ground	H	A	A	H	H	H	A	A	H	H	A	A	H	A	H	H	A	H	A	A	H	H	A	H	A	A	H	A	H	A	A	H	H	A	H	A	H	H	A	H	A	A	H	A	H	A
Result	D	L	L	L	W	L	L	D	D	L	W	L	L	W	W	D	W	W	D	L	W	W	L	L	L	D	W	W	W	L	L	L	L	L	D	L	W	W	W	L	D	W	L	W	W	L
Position	17	18	20	21	19	20	23	21	22	23	21	22	22	22	20	18	17	12	14	15	14	11	12	13	14	14	14	15	11	13	14	16	16	16	16	17	16	15	14	15	15	15	15	13	12	13

Updated to match(es) played on 30 April 2022. Source:
A = Away; H = Home; W = Win; D = Draw; L = Loss

==== Matches ====
The 2021–22 season fixtures were released on Thursday 24 June 2021.

7 August 2021 1	Charlton Athletic	0–0	Sheffield Wednesday	Charlton
17:30 BST		Report		Stadium: The Valley; Attendance: 17,639; Referee: Will Finnie
Note: Live on Sky Sports

14 August 2021 2	Oxford United	2–1	Charlton Athletic	Oxford
15:00 BST	Williams 23'; Brannagan 31'	Report	Washington 36' (pen.)	Stadium: Kassam Stadium; Attendance: 8,440; Referee: Thomas Bramall

17 August 2021 3	Milton Keynes Dons	2–1	Charlton Athletic	Milton Keynes
19:45 BST	Parrott 18'; Eisa 64'	Report	Stockley 15'	Stadium: Stadium MK; Attendance: 7,939; Referee: Charles Breakspear

21 August 2021 4	Charlton Athletic	0–2	Wigan Athletic	Charlton
15:00 BST		Report	Darikwa 88'; McClean 90+5'	Stadium: The Valley; Attendance: 13,839; Referee: Craig Hicks

28 August 2021 5	Charlton Athletic	2–0	Crewe Alexandra	Charlton
15:00 BST	Jaiyesimi 36'; Stockley 41'	Report		Stadium: The Valley; Attendance: 13,167; Referee: James Bell

11 September 2021 6	Charlton Athletic	1–2	Cheltenham Town	Charlton
15:00 BST	Leko 59'	Report	Blair 6'; Perry 33'	Stadium: The Valley; Attendance: 13,790; Referee: Andy Davies

18 September 2021 7	Wycombe Wanderers	2–1	Charlton Athletic	High Wycombe
15:00 BST	McCleary 43', 72'	Report	Lavelle 90+2'	Stadium: Adams Park; Attendance: 5,832; Referee: Peter Wright

21 September 2021 8	Gillingham	1–1	Charlton Athletic	Gillingham
19:45 BST	Purrington 56' (o.g.)	Report	Lee 18'	Stadium: MEMS Priestfield Stadium; Attendance: 7,301; Referee: Keith Stroud

25 September 2021 9	Charlton Athletic	2–2	Portsmouth	Charlton
15:00 BST	Clare 47'; Davison 87'	Report	Curtis 6'; Harness 72'	Stadium: The Valley; Attendance: 16,378; Referee: Antony Coggins

28 September 2021 10	Charlton Athletic	1–4	Bolton Wanderers	Charlton
19:45 BST	Davison 12'	Report	Afolayan 43'; Lee 73', 81'; Sarcevic 90+1'	Stadium: The Valley; Attendance: 12,707; Referee: Lee Swabey

2 October 2021 11	Fleetwood Town	1–2	Charlton Athletic	Fleetwood
15:00 BST	Andrew 51'	Report	Leko 41'; Stockley 69'	Stadium: Highbury Stadium; Attendance: 3,197; Referee: Oliver Langford

16 October 2021 12	Lincoln City	2–1	Charlton Athletic	Lincoln
15:00 BST	Stockley 58' (o.g.); Poole 90+1'	Report	Lavelle 63'	Stadium: LNER Stadium; Attendance: 9,169; Referee: David Webb

19 October 2021 13	Charlton Athletic	2–3	Accrington Stanley	Charlton
19:45 BST	Morgan 31' (o.g.); Stockley 78'	Report	Pell 9', 57'; Hamilton 66'	Stadium: The Valley; Attendance: 11,813; Referee: Sam Allison

23 October 2021 14	Sunderland	0–1	Charlton Athletic	Sunderland
15:00 BST		Report	Stockley 66'	Stadium: Stadium of Light; Attendance: 31,883; Referee: Darren Drysdale

30 October 2021 15	Charlton Athletic	4–0	Doncaster Rovers	Charlton
15:00 BST	Lee 21'; Washington 34' (pen.); Stockley 62'; Purrington 71'	Report		Stadium: The Valley; Attendance: 16,449; Referee: Tim Robinson

2 November 2021 16	Charlton Athletic	1–1	Rotherham United	Charlton
19:45 GMT	Washington 83'	Report	Miller 45+2'	Stadium: The Valley; Attendance: 12,592; Referee: Scott Oldham

13 November 2021 17	Burton Albion	0–1	Charlton Athletic	Burton upon Trent
15:00 GMT		Report	Purrington 20'	Stadium: Pirelli Stadium; Attendance: 3,555; Referee: Trevor Kettle

20 November 2021 18	Charlton Athletic	2–0	Plymouth Argyle	Charlton
15:00 GMT	Purrington 61'; Washington 84'	Report		Stadium: The Valley; Attendance: 26,090; Referee: Christopher Pollard

23 November 2021 19	Morecambe	2–2	Charlton Athletic	Morecambe
19:45 GMT	Stockton 29' (pen.); O'Connor 72'	Report	Jaiyesimi 2'; Washington 27'	Stadium: Mazuma Stadium; Attendance: 4,009; Referee: Andy Haines

27 November 2021 20	Shrewsbury Town	1–0	Charlton Athletic	Shrewsbury
15:00 GMT	Udoh 90+3'	Report		Stadium: New Meadow; Attendance: 6,158; Referee: Tom Nield

7 December 2021 21	Charlton Athletic	2–0	Ipswich Town	Charlton
19:45 GMT	Stockley 26'; Gilbey 88'	Report		Stadium: The Valley; Attendance: 26,376; Referee: Christopher Sarginson

11 December 2021 22	Charlton Athletic	2–0	Cambridge United	Charlton
15:00 GMT	Washington 30', 89'	Report		Stadium: The Valley; Attendance: 24,886; Referee: Benjamin Speedie

18 December 2021 23	Plymouth Argyle	1–0	Charlton Athletic	Plymouth
15:00 GMT	Agard 45+2'	Report		Stadium: Home Park; Attendance: 12,711; Referee: Craig Hicks

1 January 2022 24	Charlton Athletic	0–1	Wycombe Wanderers	Charlton
15:00 GMT		Report	Vokes 35'	Stadium: The Valley; Attendance: 18,895; Referee: Paul Howard

12 January 2022 25	Crewe Alexandra	2–1	Charlton Athletic	Crewe
19:45 GMT	Finney 38'; Mandron 45+3'	Report	Burstow 80'	Stadium: Mornflake Stadium; Attendance: 3,556; Referee: Robert Lewis

15 January 2022 26	Cheltenham Town	1–1	Charlton Athletic	Cheltenham
15:00 GMT	N'Lundulu 43'	Report	Aneke 90+4'	Stadium: Jonny-Rocks Stadium; Attendance: 4,709; Referee: Sebastian Stockbridge

22 January 2022 27	Charlton Athletic	2–0	Fleetwood Town	Charlton
15:00 GMT	Burstow 53'; Morgan 90+2'	Report		Stadium: The Valley; Attendance: 21,811; Referee: Brett Huxtable

31 January 2022 28	Portsmouth	1–2	Charlton Athletic	Portsmouth
19:45 GMT	Jacobs 79'	Report	Washington 31'; Robertson 64' (o.g.)	Stadium: Fratton Park; Attendance: 15,326; Referee: Neil Hair
Note: Live on Sky Sports

5 February 2022 29	Charlton Athletic	3–2	AFC Wimbledon	Charlton
15:00 GMT	Inniss 18'; Washington 31'; Famewo 60'	Report	Chislett 3'; Heneghan 36'	Stadium: The Valley; Attendance: 22,486; Referee: Christopher Pollard

8 February 2022 30	Bolton Wanderers	2–1	Charlton Athletic	Horwich
20:00 GMT	Charles 10'; Aimson 83'	Report	Aneke 76'	Stadium: University of Bolton Stadium; Attendance: 13,523; Referee: Ben Toner

12 February 2022 31	Wigan Athletic	2–1	Charlton Athletic	Wigan
15:00 GMT	Keane 26' (pen.); Humphrys 74'	Report	Lee 7'	Stadium: DW Stadium; Attendance: 9,657; Referee: Tom Nield

19 February 2022 32	Charlton Athletic	0–4	Oxford United	Charlton
15:00 GMT		Report	Taylor 21', 28'; Baldock 54'; Brannagan 83'	Stadium: The Valley; Attendance: 14,029; Referee: Carl Boyeson

22 February 2022 33	Charlton Athletic	0–2	Milton Keynes Dons	Charlton
19:45 GMT		Report	Watson 41'; Hayden 59'	Stadium: The Valley; Attendance: 8,807; Referee: Sam Purkiss

26 February 2022 34	Sheffield Wednesday	2–0	Charlton Athletic	Owlerton
15:00 GMT	Byers 5'; Patterson 45'	Report		Stadium: Hillsborough Stadium; Attendance: 21,845; Referee: Oliver Langford

5 March 2022 35	Charlton Athletic	0–0	Sunderland	Charlton
15:00 GMT		Report		Stadium: The Valley; Attendance: 13,716; Referee: Anthony Backhouse

12 March 2022 36	Accrington Stanley	2–1	Charlton Athletic	Accrington
15:00 GMT	Longelo 28'; Leigh 32'	Report	Stockley 18' (pen.)	Stadium: Wham Stadium; Attendance: 2,543; Referee: Simon Mather

15 March 2022 37	Charlton Athletic	1–0	Gillingham	Charlton
19:45 GMT	Gilbey 40'	Report		Stadium: The Valley; Attendance: 9,728; Referee: Will Finnie

19 March 2022 38	Charlton Athletic	2–0	Burton Albion	Charlton
15:00 GMT	Washington 12'; Blackett-Taylor 42'	Report		Stadium: The Valley; Attendance: 11,348; Referee: Rebecca Welch

26 March 2022 39	Doncaster Rovers	0–1	Charlton Athletic	Doncaster
15:00 GMT		Report	Stockley 66'	Stadium: Keepmoat Stadium; Attendance: 6,350; Referee: Sam Allison

2 April 2022 40	Charlton Athletic	1–2	Lincoln City	Charlton
15:00 BST	Stockley 88'	Report	Whittaker 33'; Scully 76'	Stadium: The Valley; Attendance: 10,091; Referee: Robert Madley

5 April 2022 41	AFC Wimbledon	1–1	Charlton Athletic	Wimbledon
19:45 BST	Robinson 87'	Report	Stockley 69'	Stadium: Plough Lane; Attendance: 8,184; Referee: Neil Hair

9 April 2022 42	Rotherham United	0–1	Charlton Athletic	Rotherham
15:00 BST		Report	Dobson 55'	Stadium: New York Stadium; Attendance: 9,087; Referee: Ross Joyce

15 April 2022 43	Charlton Athletic	2–3	Morecambe	Charlton
15:00 BST	Stockley 53'; Aneke 81'	Report	Stockton 26'; Gnahoua 43', 59'	Stadium: The Valley; Attendance: 10,700; Referee: Marc Edwards

19 April 2022 44	Cambridge United	0–2	Charlton Athletic	Cambridge
19:45 BST		Report	Blackett-Taylor 73'; Washington 80'	Stadium: Abbey Stadium; Attendance: 5,409; Referee: Paul Howard

23 April 2022 45	Charlton Athletic	2–0	Shrewsbury Town	Charlton
15:00 BST	Stockley 64'; Aneke 86'	Report		Stadium: The Valley; Attendance: 11,287; Referee: Sam Purkiss

30 April 2022 46	Ipswich Town	4–0	Charlton Athletic	Ipswich
12:30 BST	Bakinson 7'; Burns 11', 50'; Norwood 88'	Report		Stadium: Portman Road; Attendance: 26,002; Referee: Charles Breakspear

=== FA Cup ===
The first round draw was made on Sunday 17 October 2021. The second round draw was made on Monday 8 November 2021. The third round draw was made on Monday 6 December 2021.

6 November 2021 First round	Charlton Athletic	4–0	Havant & Waterlooville	Charlton
15:00 GMT	Davison 72'; Stockley 76' (pen.), 85'; Burstow 90'	Report		Stadium: The Valley; Attendance: 3,865; Referee: Carl Brook

3 December 2021 Second round	Gateshead	0–2	Charlton Athletic	Gateshead
19:45 GMT		Report	Stockley 30', 54'	Stadium: Gateshead International Stadium; Attendance: 3,746; Referee: Tom Reeves
Note: Live on ITV 4

9 January 2022 Third round	Charlton Athletic	0–1	Norwich City	Charlton
14:00 GMT		Report	Rashica 79'	Stadium: The Valley; Attendance: 13,835; Referee: Joshua Smith

=== EFL Cup ===
The first round draw was made on Thursday 24 June 2021 on Sky Sports by Andy Cole and Danny Mills.

10 August 2021 First round	Charlton Athletic	0–1	AFC Wimbledon	Charlton
19:45 BST		Report	Osew 26'	Stadium: The Valley; Attendance: 3,372; Referee: Robert Lewis

=== EFL Trophy ===
The regional group stage draw was confirmed on Thursday 24 June 2021 by Anton Ferdinand. The group stage dates were announced on Wednesday 14 July 2021. The second round draw was made on Saturday 13 November 2021. The third round draw was made on Saturday 4 December 2021 by Kevin Phillips and Jay Bothroyd. The quarter-finals draw was made on Thursday 6 January 2022.

Pos	Div	Team	Pld	W	PW	PL	L	GF	GA	GD	Pts	Qualification
1	L2	Leyton Orient	3	3	0	0	0	6	0	+6	9	Advance to Round 2
2	L1	Charlton Athletic	3	2	0	0	1	10	3	+7	6	Advance to Round 2
3	ACA	Southampton U21	3	1	0	0	2	5	5	0	3	
4	L2	Crawley Town	3	0	0	0	3	1	14	−13	0	

Source: EFL.com

31 August 2021 Group stage 1	Charlton Athletic	6–1	Crawley Town	Charlton
19:00 BST	Davison 5', 90'; Blackett-Taylor 18'; Lee 22'; Francomb 54' (o.g.); Burstow 82'	Report	Appiah 75' (pen.)	Stadium: The Valley; Attendance: 1,404; Referee: Neil Hair

5 October 2021 Group stage 2	Charlton Athletic	4–1	Southampton U21	Charlton
19:00 BST	Stockley 28', 34' (pen.); Purrington 45+2'; Pearce 90+2'	Report	Lancashire 75'	Stadium: The Valley; Attendance: 689; Referee: David Rock

9 November 2021 Group stage 3	Leyton Orient	1–0	Charlton Athletic	Leyton
19:00 GMT	Smyth 78'	Report		Stadium: Breyer Group Stadium; Attendance: 2,297; Referee: Sam Purkiss

30 November 2021 Second round	Charlton Athletic	2–1	Aston Villa U21	Charlton
19:00 GMT	Burstow 15'; Stockley 43' (pen.)	Report	Thorndike 40'	Stadium: The Valley; Attendance: 1,283; Referee: Christopher Pollard

4 January 2022 Third round	Charlton Athletic	1–0	Milton Keynes Dons	Charlton
19:00 GMT	Leko 90+1'	Report		Stadium: The Valley; Attendance: 1,653; Referee: Lee Swabey

25 January 2022 Quarter-finals	Hartlepool United	2–2 (5–4 p)	Charlton Athletic	Hartlepool
19:00 GMT	Grey 7'; Molyneux 73'	Report	Burstow 17'; Gilbey 32'	Stadium: The Suit Direct Stadium; Attendance: 3,615; Referee: Sam Barrott
	Penalties
	Cullen (penalty scored); Crawford (penalty scored); Shelton (penalty scored); Molyneux (penalty scored); Sterry (penalty scored)		Washington (penalty scored); Gilbey (penalty scored); Clare (penalty scored); Lee (penalty missed); Aneke (penalty scored)

=== London Senior Cup ===
Charlton were drawn against Erith & Belvedere for the first round of the London Senior Cup.

22 September 2021 First round	Erith & Belvedere	3–2	Charlton Athletic	Welling
19:45 GMT	Rooney 43' (pen.); Brown 74'; Barrett 90+2'	Report	Williams 49'; Viggars 53'	Stadium: Park View Road; Attendance: 208; Referee: Morgan Conn
