= James Vennings =

English footballer (born 2000)

Personal information
- Full name: James Frederick Vennings
- Date of birth: 20/11/2000
- Place of birth: Bexley, England
- Height: 5 ft 11 in (1.80 m)
- Position: Midfielder

Team information
- Current team: Ebbsfleet United

Youth career
- Our Lady Youth
- 2010–2012: Arsenal
- 2012–2019: Charlton Athletic

Senior career*
Years	Team	Apps	(Gls)
2019–2022	Charlton Athletic	4	(0)
2021	→ Aldershot Town (loan)	8	(0)
2022	→ Aldershot Town (loan)	5	(0)
2022	→ Bromley (loan)	12	(1)
2022–2024	Bromley	56	(1)
2024–2026	Braintree Town	77	(0)
2026–	Ebbsfleet United	0	(0)

International career^{‡}
2023	England C	1	(0)
- * Club domestic league appearances and goals as of 17:10, 9 June 2026 (UTC) ‡ National team caps and goals as of 17:10, 9 June 2026 (UTC)

James Frederick Vennings (born 20 November 2000) is an English professional footballer who plays as a midfielder for National League South club Ebbsfleet United.

== Career ==
Vennings started his career at local grassroots side, Our Lady Youth, before joining Arsenal at the age of nine. Following two years in North London, he signed for Charlton Athletic. On 30 November 2019, he made his debut for Charlton during a 3–1 home defeat to Sheffield Wednesday, replacing fellow academy graduate, Albie Morgan with less than 30 minutes to play. During his time at The Valley, Vennings also enjoyed brief loan spells in the National League with Aldershot Town and Bromley before leaving the club in June 2022 upon the expiry of his contract.

Ahead of the 2022–23 campaign, Vennings returned to Bromley on a permanent deal following his loan spell. During his two years at the club, he went onto feature over 60 times, scoring just once. Following the club's promotion to League Two, he left in June 2024 at the end of his contract.

On 5 June 2024, it was announced that Vennings would join newly-promoted National League side, Braintree Town ahead of the 2024–25 campaign.

On 9 June 2026, Vennings joined National League South side Ebbsfleet United.

== Career statistics ==
As of match played 25 April 2026

Club	Season	League			FA Cup		EFL Cup		Other		Total	
Club	Season	Division	Apps	Goals	Apps	Goals	Apps	Goals	Apps	Goals	Apps	Goals
Charlton Athletic	2019–20	Championship	3	0	1	0	0	0	–		4	0
Charlton Athletic	2020–21	League One	1	0	1	0	1	0	3 (Note: Appearances in EFL Trophy)	0	6	0
Charlton Athletic	2021–22	League One	0	0	0	0	0	0	0	0	0	0
Charlton Athletic	Charlton Athletic total		4	0	2	0	1	0	3	0	10	0
Aldershot Town (loan)	2021–22	National League	13	0	1	0	—		0	0	14	0
Bromley (loan)	2021–22	National League	12	1	—		—		2 (Note: Appearance(s) in FA Trophy)	0	14	1
Bromley	2022–23	National League	40	1	1	0	—		1	0	42	1
Bromley	2023–24	National League	16	0	2	0	—		1	0	19	0
Bromley	Bromley total		68	2	3	0	—		4	0	75	2
Braintree Town	2024–25	National League	33	0	2	0	—		4 (Note: One appearance in FA Trophy and three appearances in the National League Cup)	0	39	0
Braintree Town	2025–26	National League	44	0	2	0	—		5 (Note: One appearance in FA Trophy and four appearances in the National League Cup)	0	51	0
Braintree Town	Braintree Town total		77	0	4	0	—		9	0	90	0
Ebbsfleet United	2026–27	National League South	0	0	0	0	—		0	0	0	0
Career total			162	2	10	0	1	0	16	0	189	2

== Honours ==
Bromley

- FA Trophy: 2021–22
- National League play-offs: 2024
