= Nazir Bakrin =

English footballer (born 2002)

Personal information
- Full name: Nazir Oladayo Temitope Olajide Bakrin
- Date of birth: 23 October 2002 (age 24)
- Place of birth: Croydon, England
- Position: Defender

Team information
- Current team: Dover Athletic

Youth career
- 2014–2019: Fulham
- 2019–2021: Charlton Athletic

Senior career*
Years	Team	Apps	(Gls)
2021–2024	Charlton Athletic	0	(0)
2022	→ Cray Wanderers (loan)	10	(1)
2024	→ Weymouth (loan)	2	(1)
2024–2026	Tonbridge Angels	69	(2)
2026–	Dover Athletic	0	(0)
- * Club domestic league appearances and goals as of 17:10, 26 April 2025 (UTC)

Nazir Oladayo Temitope Olajide Bakrin (born 23 October 2002) is an English professional footballer who plays as a defender for National League South club Dover Athletic.

== Club career ==
Bakrin joined Charlton Athletic from Fulham as an under-17. On 25 January 2022, Bakrin joined Cray Wanderers on a month's youth loan. On 25 February 2022, Bakrin's loan was extended for a further month. On 30 March 2022, it was announced that Bakrin's loan at Cray Wanderers had ended. On 9 February 2024, Bakrin joined Weymouth on a month-long loan. On 22 May 2024, it was confirmed that Bakrin would leave Charlton Athletic upon the expiry of his contract.

On 2 August 2024, Bakrin joined Tonbridge Angels.

On 25 May 2026, Bakrin agreed to join fellow National League South side, Dover Athletic following his departure from Tonbridge Angels.

== Career statistics ==
As of 26 April 2025.

Appearances and goals by club, season and competition
Club	Season	League			FA Cup		EFL Cup		Other		Total	
Club	Season	Division	Apps	Goals	Apps	Goals	Apps	Goals	Apps	Goals	Apps	Goals
Charlton Athletic	2021–22	League One	0	0	0	0	0	0	2 (Note: Two appearances in the EFL Trophy)	0	2	0
Charlton Athletic	2022–23	League One	0	0	0	0	0	0	1 (Note: One appearance in the EFL Trophy)	0	1	0
Charlton Athletic	2023–24	League One	0	0	0	0	0	0	0	0	0	0
Charlton Athletic	Charlton Athletic total		0	0	0	0	0	0	3	0	3	0
Cray Wanderers (loan)	2021–22	Isthmian League Premier Division	10	1	—		—		—		10	1
Weymouth (loan)	2023–24	National League South	2	1	—		—		—		2	1
Tonbridge Angels	2024–25	National League South	38	1	2	0	—		1 (Note: One appearance in the FA Trophy)	0	41	1
Tonbridge Angels	2025–26	National League South	31	1	5	0	—		1	0	37	1
Tonbridge Angels	Tonbridge Angels total		69	2	7	0	—		2	0	78	2
Dover Athletic	2026–27	National League South	0	0	0	0	—		0	0	0	0
Career total			81	4	7	0	0	0	5	0	93	3
