= Euan Williams =

English-Northern Irish footballer

Personal information
- Full name: Euan Leslie Williams
- Date of birth: 15 January 2003 (age 23)
- Place of birth: Bexley, England
- Position: Midfielder

Team information
- Current team: Dover Athletic

Youth career
- –2024: Charlton Athletic

Senior career*
Years	Team	Apps	(Gls)
2022–2024	Charlton Athletic	0	(0)
2024–2026	Gillingham	14	(0)
2026–	Dover Athletic	8	(2)

International career^{‡}
2019	England U16	3	(0)
2021	Northern Ireland U19	3	(0)
2022	Northern Ireland U21	2	(0)
- * Club domestic league appearances and goals as of 22:42, 18 October 2026 (UTC) ‡ National team caps and goals as of 17:10, 2 August 2024 (UTC)

Euan Leslie Williams (born 15 January 2003) is a professional footballer who plays as a midfielder for National League South club Dover Athletic. He has represented both England and Northern Ireland at youth international level.

== Club career ==
=== Charlton Athletic ===
Williams came through the youth ranks at Charlton Athletic and signed his first professional contract on 10 February 2020. He made his senior debut for the club as a substitute in a 1–0 victory over Milton Keynes Dons in the EFL Trophy at The Valley on 4 January 2022.

On 8 July 2022, Williams signed a new two–year deal with the club, keeping him at The Valley until at least 2024.

On 22 May 2024, it was confirmed that Williams would leave Charlton Athletic upon the expiry of his contract.

=== Gillingham ===
On 6 August 2024, Williams joined League Two side Gillingham following a successful trial period. He made his debut for the club in a 3–1 away defeat to Swansea City in the first round of the EFL Cup, in which he was also sent off following a late challenge in the 51st minute. He signed a new one-year deal in June 2025.

He was released by Gillingham at the end of the 2025–26 season.

=== Dover Athletic ===
On 1 June 2026, Williams agreed to join National League South club Dover Athletic.

== International career ==
Williams made three appearances for England under-16s in 2017, making his debut in a 2–0 defeat of Albania on 14 January 2019.

Williams then switched his allegiance to Northern Ireland, making three appearances for their under-19 side throughout 2021. He made his debut for Northern Ireland under-21s as an 84th minute substitute in a 1–3 friendly defeat to Scotland on 22 September 2023.

== Style of play ==
Williams' manager at the Charlton Athletic Academy Steve Avory has described him as "a skilful midfield player, who's currently mostly playing in a number 10 role" and "dynamic, energetic, very fit, capable of scoring goals".

Upon signing for Gillingham, Williams described himself as "very high energy, I like to play forward and run forward, I make runs in behind" and "nice, neat and tidy on the ball and I create chances".

== Career statistics ==
As of 3 May 2025.

Appearances and goals by club, season and competition
Club	Season	League			FA Cup		EFL Cup		Other		Total	
Club	Season	Division	Apps	Goals	Apps	Goals	Apps	Goals	Apps	Goals	Apps	Goals
Charlton Athletic	2021–22	League One	0	0	0	0	0	0	1 (Note: One appearance in the EFL Trophy)	0	1	0
Charlton Athletic	2022–23	League One	0	0	0	0	0	0	1	0	1	0
Charlton Athletic	2023–24	League One	0	0	0	0	0	0	0	0	0	0
Charlton Athletic	Charlton Athletic total		0	0	0	0	0	0	2	0	2	0
Gillingham	2024–25	League Two	10	0	1	0	1	0	1	0	13	0
Career total			10	0	1	0	1	0	3	0	15	0
