= Charles Clayden =

English footballer (born 2000)

Personal information
- Full name: Charles James Clayden
- Date of birth: 16 November 2000 (age 25)
- Place of birth: Havering, England
- Height: 1.73 m (5 ft 8 in)
- Positions: Wing back; winger

Team information
- Current team: Boreham Wood
- Number: 17

Youth career
- 2017–2019: Leyton Orient
- 2019–2021: Charlton Athletic

Senior career*
Years	Team	Apps	(Gls)
2017–2019	Leyton Orient	1	(0)
2019–2023	Charlton Athletic	10	(0)
2020	→ Dulwich Hamlet (loan)	4	(0)
2022	→ Wealdstone (loan)	18	(1)
2022–2023	→ Bromley (loan)	7	(1)
2023	Wealdstone	23	(3)
2023–	Boreham Wood	31	(4)
- * Club domestic league appearances and goals as of 17:10, 1 May 2025 (UTC)

Charles James Clayden is an English footballer who plays as a wing back or winger for Boreham Wood.

== Career ==
=== Leyton Orient ===
Clayden made his professional debut for Leyton Orient coming on as a 62nd-minute substitute in a 3–1 victory on the final day of the 2017–18 National League season against Gateshead.

=== Charlton Athletic ===
Clayden joined Charlton Athletic on a free transfer from Leyton Orient on 30 May 2019.

Clayden made his debut for Charlton on 7 August 2021 coming on as an 89th-minute substitute in a 0–0 draw on the opening day of the 2021–22 League One season against Sheffield Wednesday.

==== Dulwich Hamlet (loan) ====
On 24 October 2020, Clayden joined non-league Dulwich Hamlet on a month's loan.

==== Wealdstone (loan) ====
On 18 February 2022, Clayden joined National League side Wealdstone on a month's loan. Clayden scored his first senior goal in a 4–1 defeat to Eastleigh.

On 19 March 2022 it was announced that Clayden had extended his loan until the end of the season. He went on to make a total of 18 appearances for the club.

==== Bromley (loan) ====
On 7 October 2022, Clayden joined Bromley on loan until 6 January 2023.

=== Wealdstone ===
On 23 March 2023, Clayden joined Wealdstone on a permanent deal.

=== Boreham Wood ===
On 17 November 2023, Clayden joined Boreham Wood for an undisclosed fee. On 18 May 2025, Clayden scored the only goal as Boreham Wood defeated Maidstone United in the National League South play-off final.

== Career statistics ==
As of match played 18 May 2025

Appearances and goals by club, season and competition
Club	Season	League			FA Cup		EFL Cup		Other		Total	
Club	Season	Division	Apps	Goals	Apps	Goals	Apps	Goals	Apps	Goals	Apps	Goals
Leyton Orient	2017–18	National League	1	0	0	0	—		0	0	1	0
Leyton Orient	2018–19	National League	0	0	0	0	—		0	0	0	0
Leyton Orient	Leyton Orient total		1	0	0	0	0	0	0	0	1	0
Charlton Athletic	2019–20	Championship	0	0	0	0	0	0	—		0	0
Charlton Athletic	2020–21	League One	0	0	0	0	0	0	0	0	0	0
Charlton Athletic	2021–22	League One	2	0	1	0	1	0	4 (Note: Four appearances in the EFL Trophy)	0	8	0
Charlton Athletic	2022–23	League One	8	0	0	0	1	0	1 (Note: One appearance in the EFL Trophy)	0	10	0
Charlton Athletic	Charlton Athletic total		10	0	1	0	2	0	5	0	18	0
Dulwich Hamlet (loan)	2020–21	National League South	4	0	1	0	—		0	0	5	0
Wealdstone (loan)	2021–22	National League	18	1	—		—		0	0	18	1
Bromley (loan)	2022–23	National League	7	1	0	0	—		0	0	7	1
Wealdstone	2022–23	National League	8	3	—		—		—		8	3
Wealdstone	2023–24	National League	15	0	0	0	—		0	0	15	0
Wealdstone	Wealdstone total		23	3	0	0	0	0	0	0	23	3
Boreham Wood	2023–24	National League	11	0	—		—		0	0	11	0
Boreham Wood	2024–25	National League South	20	4	1	0	—		6 (Note: Three appearances in the FA Trophy and three appearances and one goal in the National League South play-offs)	1	27	5
Boreham Wood	2025–26	National League	0	0	0	0	—		0	0	0	0
Boreham Wood	Boreham Wood total		31	4	1	0	0	0	6	1	38	5
Career total			94	9	3	0	2	0	11	1	110	10

== Honours ==
Boreham Wood

- National League South play-offs: 2025
