= Harris O'Connor =

English footballer

Personal information
- Full name: Harris David O'Connor
- Date of birth: 28 May 2002 (age 24)
- Position: Defender

Youth career
- 2009–2014: Charlton Athletic
- 2014–2018: Kilmarnock
- 2018–2021: Rangers
- 2021–2023: Charlton Athletic

College career
Years	Team	Apps	(Gls)
2023–	Missouri State Bears	0	(0)

Senior career*
Years	Team	Apps	(Gls)
2020–2021	Rangers	0	(0)
2021	→ Brechin City (loan)	12	(0)
2021–2023	Charlton Athletic	0	(0)
2022–2023	→ Hemel Hempstead Town (loan)	11	(1)

International career^{‡}
2017–2018	Scotland U16	7	(0)
2018	Scotland U17	1	(0)
- * Club domestic league appearances and goals as of 20:10, 26 July 2023 (UTC) ‡ National team caps and goals as of 20:10, 26 July 2023 (UTC)

Harris David O'Connor is a Scottish professional footballer who plays as a defender for Missouri State Bears.

== Career ==
=== Early career ===
Having come through the ranks at both Charlton Athletic and Kilmarnock, O'Connor joined Rangers in the Scottish Premier League. On 10 March 2021, O'Connor joined Scottish League Two Brechin City on loan until the end of the season.

=== Charlton Athletic ===
O'Connor was released by Rangers and rejoined Charlton Athletic on 1 November 2021.

On 1 June 2022, O'Connor signed an extension to his contract at Charlton ahead of the 2022–23 season.

He made his debut for Charlton in a 3–0 EFL Trophy victory at home against Gillingham on 31 August 2022 where he started the game and played the first 67 minutes.

On 13 May 2023, it was announced that O'Connor would leave the club when his contract expired in June.

==== Hemel Hempstead Town (loan) ====
On 1 September 2022, O'Connor joined Hemel Hempstead Town on loan on 1 January 2023.

=== Missouri State Bears ===
On 26 July 2023, O'Connor went to America and joined Missouri State Bears.

== International career ==
O'Connor made his Scotland U16 debut against Poland U16s on 18 September 2017 and went on to earn seven caps at that level.

On 21 August 2018, O'Connor then made his U17 debut in a 2-0 victory over Russia U17s.

== Career statistics ==
As of match played 3 December 2022

Appearances and goals by club, season and competition
Club	Season	League			National Cup		League Cup		Other		Total	
Club	Season	Division	Apps	Goals	Apps	Goals	Apps	Goals	Apps	Goals	Apps	Goals
Rangers	2020–21	Scottish Premier League	0	0	0	0	0	0	0	0	0	0
Brechin City (loan)	2020–21	Scottish League Two	12	0	0	0	0	0	0	0	12	0
Charlton Athletic	2021–22	League One	0	0	0	0	0	0	0	0	0	0
Charlton Athletic	2022–23	League One	0	0	0	0	0	0	1 (Note: One appearance in the EFL Trophy)	0	1	0
Charlton Athletic	Charlton Athletic total		0	0	0	0	0	0	1	0	1	0
Hemel Hempstead Town (loan)	2022–23	National League South	11	1	1	0	—		1 (Note: One appearance in the FA Trophy)	0	13	1
Missouri State Bears	2023	Missouri Valley Conference	0	0	—		—		0	0	0	0
Career total			23	1	1	0	0	0	2	0	26	1
