= Dylan Gavin =

Irish footballer (born 2003)

Personal information
- Full name: Dylan John Gavin
- Date of birth: 16 January 2003 (age 23)
- Place of birth: Athlone, Ireland
- Position: Striker

Youth career
- 2016–2017: Athlone Town
- 2017–2020: Charlton Athletic

Senior career*
Years	Team	Apps	(Gls)
2020–2023	Charlton Athletic	0	(0)
2022	→ Billericay Town (loan)	16	(6)
2022–2023	→ Tonbridge Angels (loan)	12	(2)
2023	→ Welling United (loan)	5	(0)
2023	→ Dulwich Hamlet (loan)	4	(0)
2023	→ Welling United (loan)	4	(0)
2023–2024	Athlone Town	20	(2)
2024–2025	Elgin City	32	(7)
- * Club domestic league appearances and goals as of 17:10, 15 November 2025 (UTC)

Dylan John Gavin (born 16 January 2003) is an Irish footballer who plays as a striker. He is currently a free agent.

== Career ==
=== Early career ===
Gavin started his schoolboy football days in Ireland, with Athlonetown club St Peters FC. At the age of 14, he moved to St Francis; both clubs playing in the Athlone district schoolboy/girls league. It was at this time Dylan was selected for the Athlone District Emerging Talent Programme (E.T.P.), this allowed for his selection into the Athlone Schoolboys Kennedy cup team.

Gavin was also a very talented Gealic football player and played his club football at Athlone GAA. Whilst playing Gaelic football with local secondary school The Marist College, Dylan went on to win a junior Leinster GAA schools title.

Coming to the end of his time at local school football. Dylan made his move to the Airtricity League of Ireland with Athlone Town In the 2016/17 season he went on to win the Airtricity League of Ireland title at under 15 against St Patrick's Athletic Gavin scored a rebound from the penalty spot to equalize at 1-1 and went on to score the winner in the last minute of the game earning himself Man of the match and a major junior title with Athlone Town FC. He was now developing a serious eye for the goal and proven to have great power and accuracy when it came to free-kicks.

=== Charlton Athletic ===
Gavin was capped for the Republic of Ireland national football team under 16s but great interest in the young man came in from London side Charlton Athletic.

Due to strong interest in what Charlton Athletic had to offer. Dylan departed Athlone Town for a two-year scholarship with Charlton. Throughout his early days he made a very good impression and with his great vision, strength and proven scoring ability he became a regular name on the score sheet for the club at youth level. In 2021, Dylan was offered his first Professional contract with the Charlton Athletic Academy professional player development.

He made his debut for Charlton Athletic on 10 November 2020 in a 3–1 EFL Trophy victory over Leyton Orient coming on as a second-half substitute.

On 13 May 2023, it was announced that Gavin would leave the club when his contract expired in June.

==== Billericay Town (loan) ====
On 21 January 2022, Gavin joined non-league Billericay Town on a one-month loan.

On 22 February 2022, it was confirmed that Gavin's loan had been extended for a further month.

On 24 March 2022, it was confirmed that Gavin's loan had been extended until the end of the season.

On 12 April 2022, Gavin scored the winning goal for Billericay Town in the Essex Senior Cup final giving his side a 1–0 victory over Bowers & Pitsea.

==== Tonbridge Angels (loan) ====
On 19 August 2022, Gavin joined his second non-league side, Tonbridge Angels, until January 2023.

==== Welling United (loan) ====
On 14 January 2023, Gavin joined his third non-league side by signing for Welling United until 11 February 2023.

==== Dulwich Hamlet (loan) ====
On 21 February 2023, Gavin joined his fourth non-league side by signing for Dulwich Hamlet until 20 March 2023.

==== Welling United (second loan) ====
On 24 March 2023, Gavin re-joined Welling United for his fifth non-league loan.

=== Athlone Town ===
On 21 July 2023, Gavin returned to Athlone Town, the club he spent a year as a youth player.

=== Elgin City ===
On 28 June 2024, Gavin joined Scottish League Two side Elgin City.

On 12 September 2025, it was announced that Gavin had left Elgin City by mutual consent having made 49 appearances in all competitions for the club scoring nine goals. The club confirmed that Gavin was going home to his native Ireland for personal reasons.

== Career statistics ==
As of match played 30 August 2025

Appearances and goals by club, season and competition
Club	Season	League			FA Cup		EFL Cup		Other		Total	
Club	Season	Division	Apps	Goals	Apps	Goals	Apps	Goals	Apps	Goals	Apps	Goals
Charlton Athletic	2020–21	League One	0	0	0	0	0	0	1 (Note: One appearance in the EFL Trophy)	0	1	0
Charlton Athletic	2021–22	League One	0	0	0	0	0	0	0	0	0	0
Charlton Athletic	2022–23	League One	0	0	0	0	0	0	0	0	0	0
Charlton Athletic	Charlton Athletic total		0	0	0	0	0	0	1	0	1	0
Billericay Town (loan)	2021–22	National League South	16	6	—		—		2 (Note: Two appearances in the Essex Senior Cup)	3	18	9
Tonbridge Angels (loan)	2022–23	National League South	12	2	0	0	—		1 (Note: One appearance in the FA Trophy)	0	13	2
Welling United (loan)	2022–23	National League South	5	0	—		—		—		5	0
Dulwich Hamlet (loan)	2022–23	National League South	4	0	—		—		—		4	0
Welling United (loan)	2022–23	National League South	4	0	—		—		—		4	0
Athlone Town	2023	League of Ireland First Division	15	2	0	0	0	0	—		15	2
Athlone Town	2024	League of Ireland First Division	5	0	0	0	0	0	—		5	0
Athlone Town	Athlone Town total		20	2	0	0	0	0	0	0	20	2
Elgin City	2024–25	Scottish League Two	27	6	3	1	4	0	4 (Note: Two appearances in the Scottish Challenge Cup and two appearances in the Scottish League One Play-Offs)	1	38	8
Elgin City	2025–26	Scottish League Two	5	1	0	0	4	0	2 (Note: Two appearances in the Scottish Challenge Cup)	0	11	1
Elgin City	Elgin City total		32	7	3	1	8	0	6	1	49	9
Career total			93	17	3	1	8	0	10	1	114	19

== Honours ==
Billericay Town

- Essex Senior Cup: 2021–22

Charlton Athletic U21s

- London Senior Cup: 2022–23
