= Nathan Harness =

English footballer (born 2000)

Personal information
- Full name: Nathan Connor Harness
- Date of birth: 19 January 2000 (age 26)
- Place of birth: England
- Height: 6 ft 1 in (1.85 m)
- Position: Goalkeeper

Team information
- Current team: Tonbridge Angels

Youth career
- Ipswich Town
- –2018: Stevenage
- 2018–2019: Dunstable Town

Senior career*
Years	Team	Apps	(Gls)
2019–2023	Charlton Athletic	1	(0)
2020	→ Billericay Town (loan)	4	(0)
2020–2021	→ Welling United (loan)	2	(0)
2022	→ Dulwich Hamlet (loan)	6	(0)
2022	→ Bromley (loan)	0	(0)
2023–2025	Milton Keynes Dons	1	(0)
2024	→ Gateshead (loan)	6	(0)
2024	→ Wealdstone (loan)	0	(0)
2025	→ Southend United (loan)	3	(0)
2025–2026	Maidstone United	35	(0)
2026–	Tonbridge Angels	0	(0)
- * Club domestic league appearances and goals as of 20:06, 27 May 2026 (UTC)

Nathan Connor Harness (born 19 January 2000) is an English footballer who plays as a goalkeeper for National League South club Tonbridge Angels.

== Career ==
=== Charlton Athletic ===
Harness joined Charlton Athletic from Dunstable Town on 1 July 2019.

He made his debut for Charlton Athletic on 31 August 2021 in a 6–1 EFL Trophy victory over Crawley Town. On the 29 April 2022, due to illness for Charlton number one Craig MacGillivray, Harness played the full 90 minutes of Charlton's last game of the season against Ipswich Town at Portman Road, with the Addicks losing 4–0.

On 13 May 2023, it was announced that Harness would leave the club when his contract expired in June.

==== Billericay Town (loan) ====
Harness joined Billericay Town on a month's loan on 7 January 2020 where he made four appearances.

==== Welling United (loan) ====
Harness joined Welling United on a loan on 8 December 2020 where he made two appearances.

==== Dulwich Hamlet (loan) ====
On 22 January 2022, Harness joined Dulwich Hamlet on a one month loan deal.

==== Bromley (loan) ====
On 25 October 2022, Harness joined Bromley on a 28-day loan.

Harness was recalled by Charlton on 17 November 2022, having not made an appearance for Bromley.

=== Milton Keynes Dons ===
On 20 June 2023, Harness agreed to join Milton Keynes Dons when his contract expired at Charlton Athletic on 30 June 2023. He made his debut on 13 February 2024 in a 4–0 defeat to Bradford City.

==== Gateshead (loan) ====
On 23 March 2024, Harness joined Gateshead of the National League on loan until the end of the 2023–24 season.

==== Wealdstone (loan) ====
On 15 November 2024, Harness joined National League side Wealdstone on an initial one-month loan deal.

==== Southend United (loan) ====
On 15 January 2025, Harness joined Southend United on a one-month loan deal.

=== Maidstone United ===
On 30 July 2025, Harness joined National League South side Maidstone United. He departed the club at the end of the 2025–26 season.

=== Tonbridge Angels ===
On 27 May 2026, Harness joined National League South side Tonbridge Angels.

== Career statistics ==
As of end of 2025–26 season

Appearances and goals by club, season and competition
Club	Season	League			FA Cup		EFL Cup		Other		Total	
Club	Season	Division	Apps	Goals	Apps	Goals	Apps	Goals	Apps	Goals	Apps	Goals
Charlton Athletic	2019–20	Championship	0	0	0	0	0	0	—		0	0
Charlton Athletic	2020–21	League One	0	0	0	0	0	0	0	0	0	0
Charlton Athletic	2021–22	League One	1	0	0	0	0	0	5 (Note: Appearance(s) in EFL Trophy)	0	6	0
Charlton Athletic	2022–23	League One	0	0	0	0	0	0	3	0	3	0
Charlton Athletic	Total		1	0	0	0	0	0	8	0	9	0
Billericay Town (loan)	2019–20	National League South	4	0	0	0	—		0	0	4	0
Welling United (loan)	2020–21	National League South	2	0	0	0	—		0	0	2	0
Dulwich Hamlet (loan)	2021–22	National League South	6	0	0	0	—		0	0	6	0
Bromley (loan)	2022–23	National League	0	0	0	0	—		0	0	0	0
Milton Keynes Dons	2023–24	League Two	1	0	0	0	0	0	1	0	2	0
Milton Keynes Dons	2024–25	League Two	0	0	0	0	1	0	2	0	3	0
Milton Keynes Dons	Total		1	0	0	0	1	0	3	0	5	0
Gateshead (loan)	2023–24	National League	6	0	—		—		—		6	0
Wealdstone (loan)	2024–25	National League	0	0	—		—		0	0	0	0
Southend United (loan)	2024–25	National League	3	0	—		—		—		3	0
Maidstone United	2025–26	National League South	35	0	1	0	—		0	0	36	0
Career total			58	0	1	0	1	0	11	0	71	0

== Honours ==
Gateshead

- FA Trophy: 2023–24
