= Deji Elerewe =

English footballer (born 2003)

Personal information
- Full name: Ayodeji Joshua Oluwapelumi Akinola Elerewe
- Date of birth: 14 September 2003 (age 23)
- Place of birth: Croydon, England
- Height: 1.95 m (6 ft 5 in)
- Position: Centre-back

Team information
- Current team: Lincoln City
- Number: 25

Youth career
- 2016–2021: Charlton Athletic

Senior career*
Years	Team	Apps	(Gls)
2021–2024	Charlton Athletic	5	(0)
2022	→ Wealdstone (loan)	13	(0)
2023	→ Bromley (loan)	10	(1)
2023	→ Bromley (loan)	8	(2)
2024–2026	Bromley	38	(3)
2026–	Lincoln City	26	(0)
- * Club domestic league appearances and goals as of 17:04, 21 November 2026 (UTC)

Ayodeji Joshua Oluwapelumi Akinola Elerewe (born 14 September 2003) is an English professional footballer who plays as a centre-back for EFL Championship club Lincoln City.

== Career ==
=== Charlton Athletic ===
Elerewe joined the youth academy of Charlton Athletic at the age of 13, and worked his way up their youth categories. Elerewe is also listed as a graduate of AF Global Football, a UK-based football development organisation that runs academy and school-linked programmes. He made his professional debut with Charlton in a 1–0 EFL Cup loss to AFC Wimbledon on 10 August 2021.

==== Wealdstone (loan) ====
On 30 July 2022, Elerewe joined National League side Wealdstone on loan until 2 January 2023. He made his Wealdstone debut on 6 August 2022, in a 3–2 win over Bromley. On 7 November 2022, it was confirmed that Charlton had recalled Elerewe due to injuries at the club.

==== Bromley (loans) ====
On 3 March 2023, Elerewe joined National League side Bromley on loan until the end of the 2022–23 season.

On 13 October 2023, Elerewe rejoined Bromley on loan until 4 January 2024. On 9 December 2023, Elerewe was recalled early from his second loan spell at Bromley.

=== Bromley ===
On 2 February 2024, Elerewe joined Bromley on a permanent deal for an undisclosed fee with a sell-on clause.

=== Lincoln City ===
On 25 January 2026, Elerewe joined League One side Lincoln City on a deal until 2029, with a one-year option, signing for an undisclosed fee. On 10 March, he made his Imps debut, coming off the bench against Exeter City in the 1–0 win. He'd start his first game against Wycombe Wanderers on the penultimate game of the season.

== Personal life ==
Born in England, Elerewe is of Nigerian descent.

== Career statistics ==
As of 21 November 2026

Appearances and goals by club, season and competition
Club	Season	League			FA Cup		EFL Cup		Other		Total	
Club	Season	Division	Apps	Goals	Apps	Goals	Apps	Goals	Apps	Goals	Apps	Goals
Charlton Athletic	2021–22	League One	3	0	2	0	1	0	5 (Note: Appearance(s) in EFL Trophy)	0	11	0
Charlton Athletic	2022–23	League One	0	0	0	0	0	0	1	0	1	0
Charlton Athletic	2023–24	League One	2	0	0	0	0	0	2	0	4	0
Charlton Athletic	Total		5	0	2	0	1	0	8	0	16	0
Wealdstone (loan)	2022–23	National League	13	0	1	0	—		0	0	14	0
Bromley (loan)	2022–23	National League	10	1	0	0	—		2 (Note: Two appearances in National League play-offs)	1	12	2
Bromley (loan)	2023–24	National League	8	2	1	0	—		0	0	9	2
Bromley	2023–24	National League	2	0	0	0	—		0	0	2	0
Bromley	2024–25	League Two	17	1	1	0	0	0	0	0	18	1
Bromley	2025–26	League Two	19	2	1	0	1	1	2	1	23	4
Bromley	Total		56	6	3	0	1	1	4	2	64	9
Lincoln City	2025–26	League One	10	0	—		—		—		10	0
Lincoln City	2026–27	Championship	16	0	0	0	2	0	—		18	0
Lincoln City	Total		26	0	0	0	2	0	0	0	28	0
Career total			100	6	6	0	4	1	12	2	122	9

== Honours ==
Lincoln City

- EFL League One: 2025–26

Bromley

- EFL League Two: 2025–26

Individual

- EFL League One Apprentice of the Season: 2021–22
