= Jesurun Rak-Sakyi =

Ghanaian footballer (born 2002)

Personal information
- Full name: Jesurun Rak-Sakyi
- Date of birth: 5 October 2002 (age 24)
- Place of birth: Southwark, England
- Height: 1.78 m (5 ft 10 in)
- Position: Winger

Team information
- Current team: Kasımpaşa (on loan from Crystal Palace)
- Number: 17

Youth career
- –2019: Chelsea
- 2019–2021: Crystal Palace

Senior career*
| Years | Team | Apps | (Gls) |
| 2021– | Crystal Palace | 8 | (0) |
| 2022–2023 | → Charlton Athletic (loan) | 43 | (15) |
| 2024–2025 | → Sheffield United (loan) | 34 | (7) |
| 2025–2026 | → Çaykur Rizespor (loan) | 11 | (4) |
| 2026 | → Stoke City (loan) | 15 | (2) |
| 2026– | → Kasımpaşa (loan) | 2 | (0) |

International career^{‡}
| 2021–2022 | England U20 | 5 | (1) |
| 2024 | England U21 | 2 | (0) |
| 2026– | Ghana | 1 | (0) |
- * Club domestic league appearances and goals as of 17:10, 4 October 2026 (UTC) ‡ National team caps and goals as of 17:10, 4 October 2026 (UTC)

Jesurun Rak-Sakyi (born 5 October 2002) is a professional footballer who plays as a winger for Turkish Süper Lig club Kasımpaşa, on loan from Premier League club Crystal Palace. Born in England, he plays for the Ghana national team.

== Club career ==
=== Crystal Palace ===
Rak-Sakyi was born in Southwark, London and attended Westminster City School along with his brother, Samuel. Rak-Sakyi played in the youth academy at Chelsea, before joining Crystal Palace in 2019. His first appearance in the Crystal Palace first-team squad was as an unused substitute against his previous club on 10 April 2021, and he signed his first professional contract for the club two days later. He made his debut as a substitute in a 3–0 defeat against former club Chelsea on 14 August 2021 in the Premier League. Rak-Sakyi made his first start for the club in their final home game of the 2021–22 season, a 1–0 win against Manchester United.

==== Charlton Athletic (loan) ====
On 11 August 2022, Rak-Sakyi joined Charlton Athletic on a season-long loan for their 2022–23 campaign. He made his debut for the Addicks, in a 5–1 League One win at home to Plymouth Argyle on 17 August 2022, scoring Charlton's first goal.

Ten days later, on 27 August 2022, Rak-Sakyi scored for Charlton again in a 1–1 League One draw away at Wycombe Wanderers.

After scoring 15 goals and registering eight assists, he was later named the club's Supporters' Player of the Year for his performances across the season, receiving 46% of fans' votes.

==== Sheffield United (loan) ====
On 16 August 2024, Rak-Sakyi joined Championship club Sheffield United on loan for the 2024–25 season.

He played 36 times for the Blades, scoring seven goals helping them to reach the 2025 EFL Championship play-off final where they lost 2–1 to Sunderland.

==== Çaykur Rizespor (loan) ====
On 12 September 2025, Rak-Sakyi joined Turkish Süper Lig club Çaykur Rizespor on a season-long loan. In January 2026, Rak-Sakyi was recalled by to Crystal Palace.

==== Stoke City (loan) ====
On 2 February 2026, Rak-Sakyi joined Championship side Stoke City on loan for the remainder of the 2025–26 season.

Rak-Sakyi made 16 appearances for Stoke, scoring twice against Oxford United and Sheffield Wednesday.

==== Kasımpaşa (loan) ====
On 4 September 2026, Rak-Sakyi returned to the Turkish Süper Lig by joining Kasımpaşa on loan for the remainder of the 2026–27 season.

== International career ==
Though Rak-Sakyi is also eligible to represent Ghana through his parents, he accepted a call-up to the England U20s squad in September 2021 to replace an injured Anthony Gordon. On 6 September 2021, he made a goalscoring debut during a 6–1 victory over the Romania U20s at St. George's Park.

On 13 November 2024, Rak-Sakyi was called up to the England U21s squad for the first time and made his debut two days later during a goalless draw with Spain in La Línea de la Concepción.

Rak-Sakyi has received his first senior international call-up to Ghana for a friendly against Mexico.

== Personal life ==
Rak-Sakyi's younger brother, Samuel is also a professional footballer.

== Career statistics ==
=== Club ===
As of match played 13 September 2026

Appearances and goals by club, season and competition
| Club | Season | League | | | National cup (Note: Includes FA Cup, Turkish Cup) | | League cup (Note: Includes EFL Cup) | | Other | | Total | |
| Club | Season | Division | Apps | Goals | Apps | Goals | Apps | Goals | Apps | Goals | Apps | Goals |
|---|---|---|---|---|---|---|---|---|---|---|---|---|
| Crystal Palace | 2021–22 | Premier League | 2 | 0 | 0 | 0 | 0 | 0 | — | | 2 | 0 |
| Crystal Palace | 2022–23 | Premier League | 0 | 0 | 0 | 0 | 0 | 0 | — | | 0 | 0 |
| Crystal Palace | 2023–24 | Premier League | 6 | 0 | 0 | 0 | 2 | 0 | — | | 8 | 0 |
| Crystal Palace | 2024–25 | Premier League | 0 | 0 | 0 | 0 | 0 | 0 | — | | 0 | 0 |
| Crystal Palace | 2025–26 | Premier League | 0 | 0 | 0 | 0 | 0 | 0 | 0 | 0 | 0 | 0 |
| Crystal Palace | 2026–27 | Premier League | 0 | 0 | 0 | 0 | 0 | 0 | 0 | 0 | 0 | 0 |
| Crystal Palace | Total | | 8 | 0 | 0 | 0 | 2 | 0 | 0 | 0 | 10 | 0 |
| Charlton Athletic (loan) | 2022–23 | League One | 43 | 15 | 2 | 0 | 4 | 0 | 0 | 0 | 49 | 15 |
| Sheffield United (loan) | 2024–25 | Championship | 34 | 7 | 0 | 0 | 1 | 0 | 1 (Note: Appearance in Championship play-offs) | 0 | 36 | 7 |
| Çaykur Rizespor (loan) | 2025–26 | Süper Lig | 11 | 4 | 2 | 0 | — | | — | | 13 | 4 |
| Stoke City (loan) | 2025–26 | Championship | 15 | 2 | 1 | 0 | 0 | 0 | — | | 16 | 2 |
| Kasımpaşa (loan) | 2026–27 | Süper Lig | 2 | 0 | 0 | 0 | — | | — | | 2 | 0 |
| Career total | | | 113 | 28 | 5 | 0 | 7 | 0 | 1 | 0 | 126 | 28 |

=== International ===
As of match played 22 May 2026

Appearances and goals by national team and year
| National team | Year | Apps | Goals |
|---|---|---|---|
Ghana
| Ghana | 2026 | 1 | 0 |
| Total | | 1 | 0 |

== Honours ==
Individual

- Charlton Athletic Player of the Year: 2022–23
