= Aaron Henry (footballer) =

English footballer

- Henry with Wealdstone in 2026

Personal information
- Full name: Aaron Lewis Henry
- Date of birth: 31 August 2003 (age 23)
- Place of birth: Basildon, England
- Height: 1.75 m (5 ft 9 in)
- Position: Midfielder

Team information
- Current team: Wealdstone
- Number: 15

Youth career
- –2020: Charlton Athletic

Senior career*
Years	Team	Apps	(Gls)
2020–2025	Charlton Athletic	14	(0)
2022	→ Wealdstone (loan)	20	(2)
2023–2024	→ Crawley Town (loan)	13	(0)
2024	→ Wealdstone (loan)	17	(1)
2024–2025	→ Rochdale (loan)	14	(1)
2025–2026	Boreham Wood	5	(1)
2025–2026	→ Hornchurch (loan)	9	(1)
2026–	Wealdstone	13	(2)

International career
2019	England U16	4	(0)
- * Club domestic league appearances and goals as of 17:10, 10 November 2026 (UTC)

Aaron Lewis Henry (born 31 August 2003) is an English footballer who plays as a midfielder for National League side Wealdstone.

== Club career ==
=== Charlton Athletic ===
Henry made his professional debut with Charlton Athletic in a 1–0 FA Cup loss to West Bromwich Albion on 4 January 2020. In October 2020, he signed a professional contract with Charlton until 2023.

Henry scored his first goal for Charlton in an EFL Cup tie against Queens Park Rangers on 9 August 2022.

On 31 May 2023, Henry – at the age of 19 – signed a new two-year deal with Charlton Athletic with an option for the third year.

On 30 May 2025, it was confirmed Henry would leave the club following the conclusion of his contract.

==== Wealdstone (loan) ====
On 4 February 2022, Henry joined Wealdstone on an initial one-month loan, which was extended until the end of the season in March 2022.

On 19 March 2022, Henry scored his first senior goal, a 25 yard free kick in an eventual 4-2 defeat to Stockport County. Henry played a total of 20 times for Wealdstone, scoring one further goal for the club, also a free kick, in a 2-0 victory over Boreham Wood.

==== Crawley Town (loan) ====
On 4 August 2023, Henry joined Crawley Town on a season-long loan for the 2023-24 campaign.

==== Wealdstone (second loan) ====
On 5 January 2024, Henry re-joined Wealdstone on a loan until the end of the 2023-24 season.

==== Rochdale (loan) ====
On 9 July 2024, Henry joined Rochdale on loan until the end of the 2024-25 season.

On 27 November 2024, it was confirmed that Henry would be out of action for a lengthy spell after breaking a bone in his foot and that he may need to return to Charlton Athletic for his rehabilitation.

On 7 January 2025, following injury, Henry returned to Charlton Athletic to continue his rehabilitation.

=== Boreham Wood ===
On 2 July 2025, Henry joined Boreham Wood.

In November 2025, Henry joined National League South leaders Hornchurch on loan until January 2026.

==== Wealdstone ====
On 17th July 2026, Henry joined Wealdstone for a third time.

== Career statistics ==
As of match played 31 October 2026

Appearances and goals by club, season and competition
Club	Season	League			FA Cup		League Cup		Other		Total	
Club	Season	Division	Apps	Goals	Apps	Goals	Apps	Goals	Apps	Goals	Apps	Goals
Charlton Athletic	2019–20	Championship	0	0	1	0	0	0	0	0	1	0
Charlton Athletic	2020–21	League One	0	0	0	0	0	0	3 (Note: Three appearances in the EFL Trophy)	0	3	0
Charlton Athletic	2021–22	League One	0	0	0	0	0	0	3	0	3	0
Charlton Athletic	2022–23	League One	14	0	1	0	3	1	3	1	21	2
Charlton Athletic	2023–24	League One	0	0	0	0	0	0	0	0	0	0
Charlton Athletic	2024–25	League One	0	0	0	0	0	0	0	0	0	0
Charlton Athletic	Charlton Athletic total		14	0	2	0	3	1	9	1	28	2
Wealdstone (loan)	2021–22	National League	20	2	—		—		—		20	2
Crawley Town (loan)	2023–24	League Two	13	0	0	0	1	0	3	0	17	0
Wealdstone (loan)	2023–24	National League	17	1	—		—		3 (Note: Three appearances in the FA Trophy)	1	20	2
Rochdale (loan)	2024–25	National League	14	1	1	0	—		1 (Note: One appearance in the National League Cup)	0	16	1
Boreham Wood	2025–26	National League	5	1	0	0	—		6 (Note: Five appearances in the National League Cup and one appearance in the National League play-offs)	1	11	2
Hornchurch (loan)	2025–26	National League South	9	1	—		—		2 (Note: Two appearances in the FA Trophy)	0	11	1
Wealdstone	2026–27	National League	13	2	1	0	—		3 (Note: Two appearances in the National League Cup)	0	17	2
Career total			105	8	4	0	4	1	27	3	140	12
