= Ryan Viggars =

Welsh footballer

Personal information
- Full name: Ryan James Viggars
- Date of birth: 17 April 2003 (age 23)
- Place of birth: Rotherham, England
- Height: 1.84 m (6 ft 0 in)
- Position: Forward

Team information
- Current team: Worksop Town
- Number: 19

Youth career
- –2021: Sheffield United
- 2021–2024: Charlton Athletic

Senior career*
Years	Team	Apps	(Gls)
2021–2024	Charlton Athletic	0	(0)
2022	→ Needham Market (loan)	5	(2)
2023	→ Maidstone United (loan)	8	(0)
2024–2026	Buxton	7	(1)
2026–	Worksop Town	15	(6)

International career^{‡}
2019	Wales U17	3	(2)
2021	Wales U18	1	(0)
2021–	Wales U19	5	(1)
- * Club domestic league appearances and goals as of 03 November 2026 ‡ National team caps and goals as of 17 January 2025

Ryan James Viggars (born 17 April 2003) is a Welsh professional footballer who plays as a striker for Worksop.

== Club career ==
=== Charlton Athletic ===
Viggars joined Charlton Athletic from Sheffield United in 2021.

On 22 May 2024, it was confirmed that Viggars would leave Charlton Athletic upon the expiry of his contract.

==== Needham Market (loan) ====
On 26 August 2022, Viggars joined Needham Market on loan until 1 October 2022.

==== Maidstone United (loan) ====
On 24 March 2023, Viggars joined Maidstone United on loan until the end of the season.

=== Buxton ===
On 21 November 2024, Viggars signed for National League North side Buxton.

=== Worksop Town F.C. ===
In the summer of 2026, Viggers signed for National League North side Worksop.

== Career statistics ==
=== Club ===
As of 21 April 2025.

Appearances and goals by club, season and competition
Club	Season	League			FA Cup		EFL Cup		Other		Total	
Club	Season	Division	Apps	Goals	Apps	Goals	Apps	Goals	Apps	Goals	Apps	Goals
Charlton Athletic	2021–22	League One	0	0	0	0	0	0	1 (Note: One appearance in the EFL Trophy)	0	1	0
Charlton Athletic	2022–23	League One	0	0	0	0	0	0	0	0	0	0
Charlton Athletic	2023–24	League One	0	0	0	0	0	0	0	0	0	0
Charlton Athletic	Charlton Athletic total		0	0	0	0	0	0	1	0	1	0
Needham Market (loan)	2022–23	Southern League; Premier Division Central	5	2	0	0	—		0	0	5	2
Maidstone United (loan)	2022–23	National League	8	0	—		—		—		8	0
Buxton	2024–25	National League North	7	1	—		—		0	0	7	1
Worksop Town	2026–27	National League North	0	0	—		—		0	0	0	0
Career total			20	3	0	0	0	0	1	0	21	3
