= Johl Powell =

English footballer

- Powell with Yeovil Town in 2026

Personal information
- Full name: Johl Cameron Powell
- Date of birth: 6 June 2001 (age 25)
- Place of birth: Bexley, England
- Height: 5 ft 9 in (1.75 m)
- Position: Midfielder

Team information
- Current team: Yeovil Town
- Number: 20

Youth career
- Millwall
- –2020: Charlton Athletic

Senior career*
Years	Team	Apps	(Gls)
2020–2022	Charlton Athletic	0	(0)
2022	→ Maidstone United (loan)	8	(1)
2022–2023	Dulwich Hamlet	27	(6)
2023	Tonbridge Angels	2	(0)
2023–2024	Dover Athletic	9	(0)
2024–2026	Walton & Hersham	99	(42)
2026–	Yeovil Town	17	(8)
- * Club domestic league appearances and goals as of 22:45, 21 November 2026 (UTC)

Johl Cameron Powell (born 6 June 2001) is an English footballer who plays as a midfielder for National League side Yeovil Town.

== Career ==
Powell started his career at Millwall before joining Charlton Athletic. He made his debut Charlton on 10 November 2020 in a 3–1 EFL Trophy victory over Leyton Orient. On 22 February 2022, Powell joined Maidstone United on an initial month's loan. On 23 May 2022, it was announced that Powell was leaving Charlton Athletic at the end of his contract.

Following his release from Charlton Athletic Powell joined Dulwich Hamlet on 21 November 2022, making his debut off the bench in a 4–3 win against Cray Wanderers in the London Senior Cup on 30 November 2022 and scoring his first goal for the club in a 2–0 win against Weymouth in the National League South on 20 December 2022.

On the 24 May 2023, Powell signed for Tonbridge Angels. He departed the club in search of first-team football on 1 September.

On 5 September 2023, Powell signed for Dover Athletic. He departed the club in January 2024 having had his contract terminated by mutual consent.

Later that month, he signed with Southern League Premier Division South side Walton & Hersham, where he made 19 appearances and scored 5 goals in his debut season. His performances earned him a contract extension for the 2024–25 campaign. On 26 March 2025, Powell signed a new one-year deal running until June 2026.

On 8 June 2026, Powell agreed to join National League club Yeovil Town on a two-year deal.

== Personal life ==
He is a supporter of Charlton Athletic.

== Career statistics ==
As of match played 21 November 2026

Appearances and goals by club, season and competition
Club	Season	League			FA Cup		EFL Cup		Other		Total	
Club	Season	Division	Apps	Goals	Apps	Goals	Apps	Goals	Apps	Goals	Apps	Goals
Charlton Athletic	2020–21	League One	0	0	0	0	0	0	1 (Note: Appearance in the EFL Trophy)	0	1	0
Charlton Athletic	2021–22	League One	0	0	0	0	1	0	1	0	2	0
Charlton Athletic	Total		0	0	0	0	1	0	2	0	3	0
Maidstone United (loan)	2021–22	National League South	8	1	—		—		—		8	1
Dulwich Hamlet	2022–23	National League South	27	6	—		—		—		27	6
Tonbridge Angels	2023–24	National League South	2	0	—		—		0	0	2	0
Dover Athletic	2023–24	National League South	9	0	2	0	—		0	0	11	0
Walton & Hersham	2023–24	Southern League Premier Division South	19	5	—		—		—		19	5
Walton & Hersham	2024–25	Southern League Premier Division South	41	16	3	2	—		5 (Note: One appearance in the FA Trophy, three appearances and one goal in Surrey Senior Cup, one in the Southern League Premier Division South play-offs)	1	49	19
Walton & Hersham	2025–26	Southern League Premier Division South	39	21	2	1	—		6 (Note: Appearances in the FA Trophy)	1	47	23
Walton & Hersham	Total		99	42	5	3	—		11	2	115	47
Yeovil Town	2026–27	National League	17	8	3	1	—		1 (Note: Appearance in Somerset Premier Cup)	0	21	9
Career total			162	57	10	4	1	0	14	2	187	63

== Honours ==
Maidstone United

- National League South: 2021–22

Walton & Hersham

- Southern League Premier Division South: 2025–26
