= Miles Leaburn =

English footballer

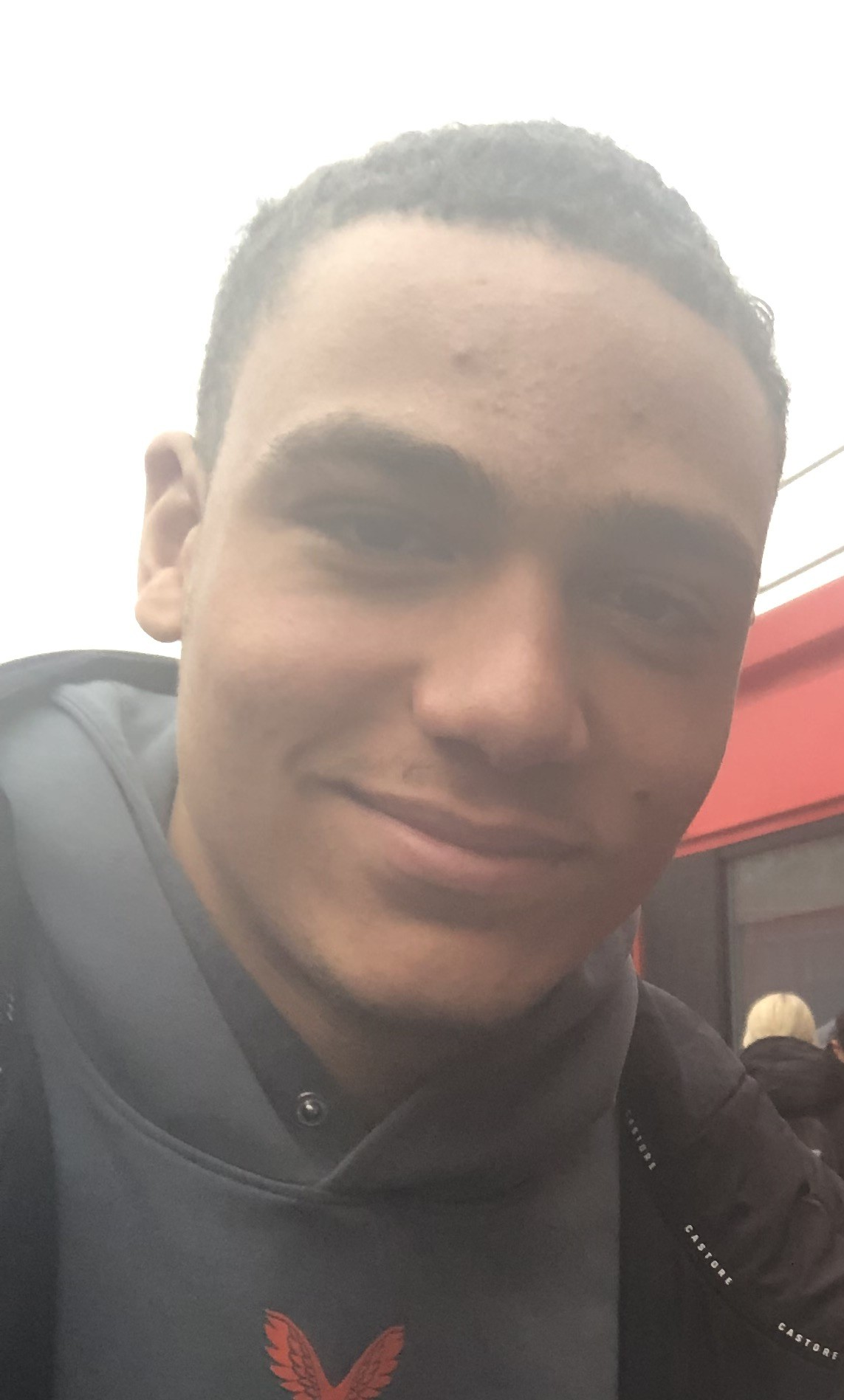
- Leaburn in 2025

Personal information
- Full name: Miles Lester Leaburn
- Date of birth: 28 November 2003 (age 22)
- Place of birth: Bromley, England
- Height: 1.98 m (6 ft 6 in)
- Position: Forward

Team information
- Current team: Charlton Athletic
- Number: 11

Youth career
- –2019: Chelsea
- 2019–2022: Charlton Athletic

Senior career*
| Years | Team | Apps | (Gls) |
| 2022– | Charlton Athletic | 127 | (23) |
- * Club domestic league appearances and goals as of 22:10, 3 November 2026 (UTC)

Miles Lester Leaburn (born 28 November 2003) is an English professional footballer who plays as a forward for EFL Championship club Charlton Athletic.

== Career ==
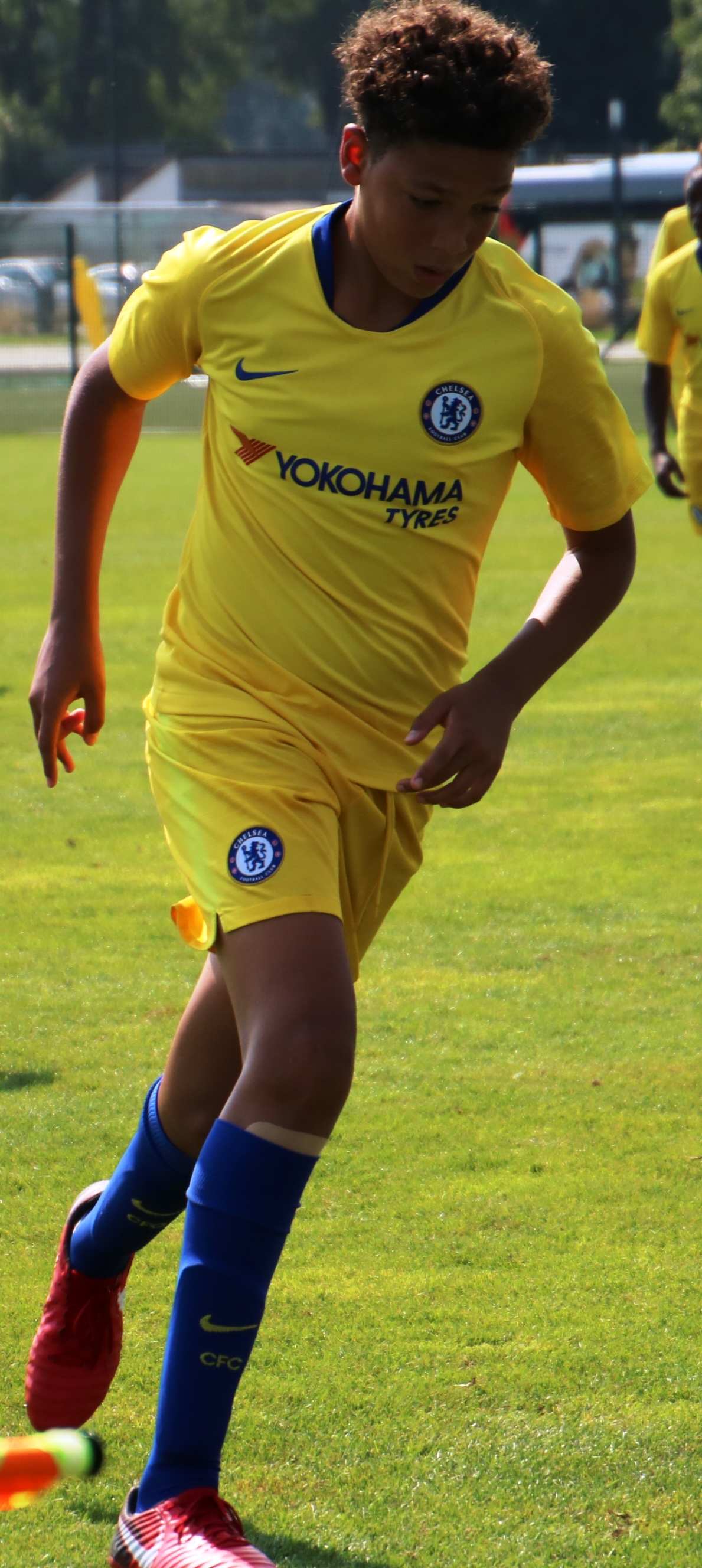
Leaburn as a youth player at Chelsea

Coming through the youth system of Chelsea, Leaburn moved to Charlton Athletic in 2019 and signed his first professional contract with the club on 11 July 2022.

He made his professional debut for Charlton, aged 18, coming off the bench in a 2–2 League One draw away at Accrington Stanley on 30 July 2022 where he scored the side's second goal. In doing so, Leaburn became the third second-generation Addick to represent Charlton's first team, following in the footsteps of his father Carl who made 376 appearances for the club – in all competitions – between 1987 and 1998.

On 31 October 2024, Charlton Athletic confirmed that it had triggered a one-year extension clause in Miles Leaburn's contract, keeping him at Charlton until the summer of 2026.

Following a run of four goals and two assists in six matches, he was named both EFL League One Player of the Month and EFL Young Player of the Month for December 2024.

On 8 July 2025, Leaburn signed a new three-year contract with the club.

== Personal life ==
Leaburn is the son of former Charlton Athletic forward Carl Leaburn and player care officer Tracey Leaburn. He is of Jamaican descent.

== Career statistics ==
As of match played 3 November 2026

Appearances and goals by club, season and competition
| Club | Season | League | | | FA Cup | | EFL Cup | | Other | | Total | |
| Club | Season | Division | Apps | Goals | Apps | Goals | Apps | Goals | Apps | Goals | Apps | Goals |
|---|---|---|---|---|---|---|---|---|---|---|---|---|
| Charlton Athletic | 2022–23 | League One | 35 | 12 | 0 | 0 | 4 | 0 | 1 (Note: Appearance in the EFL Trophy.) | 1 | 40 | 13 |
| Charlton Athletic | 2023–24 | League One | 13 | 3 | 2 | 1 | 0 | 0 | 3 (Note: Appearances in the EFL Trophy.) | 3 | 18 | 7 |
| Charlton Athletic | 2024–25 | League One | 27 | 6 | 2 | 1 | 0 | 0 | 3 (Note: Appearances in the EFL Trophy.) | 3 | 32 | 10 |
| Charlton Athletic | 2025–26 | Championship | 38 | 2 | 1 | 1 | 1 | 1 | — | | 40 | 4 |
| Charlton Athletic | 2026–27 | Championship | 14 | 0 | 0 | 0 | 2 | 0 | — | | 16 | 0 |
| Charlton Athletic | Charlton Athletic total | | 127 | 23 | 5 | 3 | 7 | 1 | 7 | 7 | 146 | 34 |
| Career total | | | 127 | 23 | 5 | 3 | 7 | 1 | 7 | 7 | 146 | 34 |

== Honours ==
Individual

- EFL League One Player of the Month: December 2024
- EFL Young Player of the Month: December 2024
