= Albie Morgan =

English footballer (born 2000)

Personal information
- Full name: Albie Robert Morgan
- Date of birth: 2 February 2000 (age 26)
- Place of birth: Lewisham, England
- Height: 5 ft 11 in (1.80 m)
- Position: Midfielder

Team information
- Current team: Blackpool
- Number: 8

Youth career
- –2018: Charlton Athletic

Senior career*
Years	Team	Apps	(Gls)
2018–2023	Charlton Athletic	114	(5)
2019	→ Ebbsfleet United (loan)	5	(1)
2023–	Blackpool	96	(9)
- * Club domestic league appearances and goals as of 22:52, 6 October 2026 (UTC)

Albie Robert Morgan (born 2 February 2000) is an English professional footballer who plays as a midfielder for EFL League One side Blackpool.

== Career ==
=== Charlton Athletic ===
Born in Portsmouth, Morgan joined Charlton Athletic at a young age and signed his first professional contract in May 2018. Following his promotion to the first-team squad, Morgan made his Charlton debut during their EFL Cup tie against AFC Wimbledon, featuring for the entire 90 minutes in a 2–2 draw.

On 13 May 2023, it was announced that Morgan would leave the club when his contract expired in June.

==== Ebbsfleet United (loan) ====
On 10 October 2019, Morgan joined Ebbsfleet United on an initial 28-day loan. Morgan was recalled by Charlton Athletic on 19 November 2019.

=== Blackpool ===
On 15 June 2023, Morgan agreed a three-year contract with Blackpool, with an option for a further 12 months.

== Career statistics ==
As of match played 6 October 2026

Appearances and goals by club, season and competition
Club	Season	League			FA Cup		EFL Cup		Other		Total	
Club	Season	Division	Apps	Goals	Apps	Goals	Apps	Goals	Apps	Goals	Apps	Goals
Charlton Athletic	2018–19	League One	8	0	2	0	1	0	5 (Note: Three appearances in the EFL Trophy and two in the League One play-offs)	0	16	0
Charlton Athletic	2019–20	Championship	21	0	1	0	1	0	–		23	0
Charlton Athletic	2020–21	League One	28	1	1	0	1	0	3 (Note: Appearance(s) in EFL Trophy)	1	33	2
Charlton Athletic	2021–22	League One	22	1	2	0	1	0	4	0	29	1
Charlton Athletic	2022–23	League One	35	3	3	1	4	0	3	1	45	5
Charlton Athletic	Total		114	5	9	1	8	0	15	2	146	8
Ebbsfleet United (loan)	2019–20	National League	5	1	0	0	–		–		5	1
Blackpool	2023–24	League One	35	3	4	2	2	0	4	1	45	6
Blackpool	2024–25	League One	36	5	1	0	1	0	1	0	39	5
Blackpool	2025–26	League One	18	0	1	0	0	0	1	0	20	0
Blackpool	2026–27	League One	7	1	0	0	1	0	2	2	10	3
Blackpool	Total		96	9	6	2	4	0	8	3	114	14
Career total			215	15	15	3	12	0	23	5	265	23
