= 2024–25 Charlton Athletic F.C. season =

Charlton Athletic
2024–25 season
- Chairman: James Rodwell (until 8 December 2024); Gavin Carter (from 8 December 2024)
- Manager: Nathan Jones
- Stadium: The Valley
- League One: 4th (Promoted via play-offs)
- Play-Offs: Winners
- FA Cup: Third round (vs. Preston North End)
- EFL Cup: First round (vs. Birmingham City)
- EFL Trophy: Second round (vs. Leyton Orient)
- Top goalscorer: League: Matt Godden (18); All: Matt Godden (22)
- Highest home attendance: 25,722 (vs. Wycombe Wanderers, 15 May 2025)
- Lowest home attendance: 1,336 (vs. Leyton Orient, 10 December 2024)
- Average home league attendance: 15,255
Home colours	Away colours	Third colours

The 2024–25 Charlton Athletic season was the club's 119th season in their existence, having been founded in 1905, and their fifth consecutive season in League One. The club participated in League One, the FA Cup, the EFL Cup and the EFL Trophy. The season covered the period from 1 July 2024 to 30 June 2025.

== Kit ==
Sportswear manufacturers Castore remained kit suppliers, with sponsorship of the home and third shirts being RSK Group whilst the away shirt sponsor was the University of Greenwich.

== Squad statistics ==
As of 25 May 2025

No.	Pos	Nat	Player	Total		League One		League One play-offs		FA Cup		EFL Cup		EFL Trophy	
No.	Pos	Nat	Player	Apps	Goals	Apps	Goals	Apps	Goals	Apps	Goals	Apps	Goals	Apps	Goals
2	DF	(England) ENG	Kayne Ramsay	36	1	30+2	1	3+0	0	0+0	0	0+1	0	0+0	0
3	DF	(England) ENG	Macaulay Gillesphey	54	6	43+1	5	3+0	1	3+0	0	1+0	0	1+2	0
4	DF	(England) ENG	Alex Mitchell	34	2	26+5	2	0+0	0	3+0	0	0+0	0	0+0	0
5	DF	(England) ENG	Lloyd Jones	41	3	35+1	3	3+0	0	1+0	0	1+0	0	0+0	0
6	MF	(Republic of Ireland) IRL	Conor Coventry	52	1	44+0	1	3+0	0	3+0	0	1+0	0	1+0	0
7	FW	(Jamaica) JAM	Tyreece Campbell	53	9	37+7	7	3+0	0	1+1	1	1+0	0	0+3	1
8	MF	(England) ENG	Luke Berry	48	8	32+9	7	1+0	0	3+0	1	1+0	0	2+0	0
9	FW	(Morocco) MAR	Gassan Ahadme	23	4	11+8	1	0+0	0	2+1	3	0+0	0	1+0	0
10	MF	(Scotland) SCO	Greg Docherty	49	4	37+3	4	3+0	0	1+1	0	0+1	0	2+1	0
11	FW	(England) ENG	Miles Leaburn	32	10	14+13	6	0+0	0	1+1	1	0+0	0	2+1	3
12	MF	(Wales) WAL	Terry Taylor	14	0	6+2	0	0+0	0	2+0	0	0+0	0	3+1	0
13	FW	(Jamaica) JAM	Kaheim Dixon	5	0	0+3	0	0+0	0	0+0	0	0+0	0	1+1	0
14	FW	(England) ENG	Danny Hylton	10	1	0+6	1	0+0	0	0+2	0	0+0	0	0+2	0
15	DF	(England) ENG	Dan Potts	3	0	1+0	0	0+0	0	0+0	0	0+0	0	2+0	0
15	DF	(Scotland) SCO	Tom McIntyre (on loan from Portsmouth)	10	0	4+6	0	0+0	0	0+0	0	0+0	0	0+0	0
16	DF	(Scotland) SCO	Josh Edwards	46	1	38+0	1	3+0	0	3+0	0	0+0	0	1+1	0
17	DF	(England) ENG	Tayo Edun	4	1	0+0	0	0+0	0	0+0	0	0+1	0	3+0	1
17	MF	(Republic of Ireland) IRL	Alex Gilbert (on loan from Middlesbrough)	14	0	2+10	0	2+0	0	0+0	0	0+0	0	0+0	0
18	MF	(Jamaica) JAM	Karoy Anderson	46	2	16+22	2	0+3	0	1+2	0	1+0	0	1+0	0
19	DF	(Uganda) UGA	Nathan Asiimwe	3	0	0+0	0	0+0	0	0+0	0	0+0	0	2+1	0
20	DF	(England) ENG	Zach Mitchell	7	1	1+0	0	0+0	0	1+1	1	0+1	0	3+0	0
21	GK	(Australia) AUS	Ashley Maynard-Brewer	24	0	19+0	0	0+0	0	1+0	0	0+0	0	4+0	0
22	FW	(England) ENG	Chuks Aneke	30	1	0+26	1	0+2	0	0+1	0	0+1	0	0+0	0
23	DF	(England) ENG	Rarmani Edmonds-Green	17	1	5+6	1	0+0	0	1+0	0	1+0	0	4+0	0
23	GK	(Australia) AUS	Dean Bouzanis	0	0	0+0	0	0+0	0	0+0	0	0+0	0	0+0	0
24	FW	(England) ENG	Matt Godden	49	22	29+12	18	3+0	1	2+1	2	0+0	0	2+0	1
25	GK	(England) ENG	Will Mannion	34	0	27+1	0	3+0	0	2+0	0	1+0	0	0+0	0
26	DF	(England) ENG	Thierry Small	48	2	32+7	2	2+1	0	1+2	0	1+0	0	2+0	0
27	DF	(England) ENG	Tennai Watson	21	0	5+11	0	1+2	0	0+0	0	1+0	0	1+0	0
28	MF	(Scotland) SCO	Allan Campbell (on loan from Luton Town)	17	0	6+6	0	0+0	0	1+1	0	0+0	0	2+1	0
28	MF	(England) ENG	Aaron Henry	0	0	0+0	0	0+0	0	0+0	0	0+0	0	0+0	0
29	FW	(Sierra Leone) SLE	Daniel Kanu	20	1	5+12	1	0+0	0	0+0	0	1+0	0	1+1	0
30	MF	(England) ENG	Ibrahim Fullah	1	0	0+1	0	0+0	0	0+0	0	0+0	0	0+0	0
32	MF	(England) ENG	Alan Mwamba	1	0	0+0	0	0+0	0	0+0	0	0+0	0	0+1	0
33	FW	(England) ENG	Micah Mbick	5	0	0+4	0	0+1	0	0+0	0	0+0	0	0+0	0
34	MF	(England) ENG	Harvey Kedwell	0	0	0+0	0	0+0	0	0+0	0	0+0	0	0+0	0
35	MF	(England) ENG	Kai Enslin	2	0	0+1	0	0+0	0	0+0	0	0+0	0	1+0	0
36	MF	(England) ENG	Henry Rylah	2	0	0+0	0	0+0	0	0+0	0	0+0	0	1+1	0
37	GK	(England) ENG	Tommy Reid	0	0	0+0	0	0+0	0	0+0	0	0+0	0	0+0	0
38	DF	(Fiji) FIJ	Josh Laqeretabua	6	0	0+2	0	0+0	0	0+1	0	0+0	0	1+2	0
—	FW	(Republic of Ireland) IRL	Patrick Casey	0	0	0+0	0	0+0	0	0+0	0	0+0	0	0+0	0

=== Top scorers ===
As of 25 May 2025

Place	Position	Nation	Number	Name	League One	League One play-offs	FA Cup	EFL Cup	EFL Trophy	Total
1	FW	(England)	24	Matt Godden	18	1	2	0	1	22
2	FW	(England)	11	Miles Leaburn	6	0	1	0	3	10
3	FW	(Jamaica)	7	Tyreece Campbell	7	0	1	0	1	9
4	MF	(England)	8	Luke Berry	7	0	1	0	0	8
5	DF	(England)	3	Macaulay Gillesphey	5	1	0	0	0	6
6	MF	(Scotland)	10	Greg Docherty	4	0	0	0	0	4
=	FW	(Morocco)	9	Gassan Ahadme	1	0	3	0	0	4
8	DF	(England)	5	Lloyd Jones	3	0	0	0	0	3
9	DF	(England)	26	Thierry Small	2	0	0	0	0	2
=	MF	(Jamaica)	18	Karoy Anderson	2	0	0	0	0	2
=	DF	(England)	4	Alex Mitchell	2	0	0	0	0	2
12	FW	(England)	22	Chuks Aneke	1	0	0	0	0	1
=	DF	(England)	23	Rarmani Edmonds-Green	1	0	0	0	0	1
=	MF	(Republic of Ireland)	6	Conor Coventry	1	0	0	0	0	1
=	FW	(Sierra Leone)	29	Daniel Kanu	1	0	0	0	0	1
=	FW	(England)	14	Danny Hylton	1	0	0	0	0	1
=	DF	(Scotland)	16	Josh Edwards	1	0	0	0	0	1
=	DF	(England)	2	Kayne Ramsay	1	0	0	0	0	1
=	DF	(England)	20	Zach Mitchell	0	0	1	0	0	1
=	DF	(England)	17	Tayo Edun	0	0	0	0	1	1
Own goals					3	0	0	0	0	3
Totals					67	2	9	0	6	84

=== Disciplinary record ===
As of 25 May 2025

Number	Nation	Position	Name	League One		League One play-offs		FA Cup		EFL Cup		EFL Trophy		Total	
Number	Nation	Position	Name	Yellow card	Red card	Yellow card	Red card	Yellow card	Red card	Yellow card	Red card	Yellow card	Red card	Yellow card	Red card
6	(Republic of Ireland)	MF	Conor Coventry	11	0	0	0	1	0	0	0	0	0	12	0
8	(England)	MF	Luke Berry	9	0	0	0	0	0	1	0	0	0	10	0
5	(England)	DF	Lloyd Jones	7	0	1	0	1	0	0	0	0	0	9	0
10	(Scotland)	MF	Greg Docherty	6	1	2	0	0	0	0	0	0	0	8	1
18	(Jamaica)	MF	Karoy Anderson	7	0	0	0	0	0	0	0	1	1	8	1
4	(England)	DF	Alex Mitchell	6	0	0	0	0	0	0	0	0	0	6	0
26	(England)	DF	Thierry Small	6	0	0	0	0	0	0	0	0	0	6	0
23	(England)	DF	Rarmani Edmonds-Green	3	0	0	0	1	0	0	0	2	0	6	0
16	(Scotland)	DF	Josh Edwards	5	0	0	0	0	0	0	0	0	0	5	0
7	(Jamaica)	FW	Tyreece Campbell	5	0	0	0	0	0	0	0	0	0	5	0
24	(England)	FW	Matt Godden	2	0	1	0	1	0	0	0	1	0	5	0
3	(England)	DF	Macaulay Gillesphey	3	0	0	0	0	0	1	0	1	0	5	0
2	(England)	DF	Kayne Ramsay	4	0	0	0	0	0	0	0	0	0	4	0
22	(England)	FW	Chuks Aneke	3	1	0	0	0	0	0	0	0	0	3	1
21	(Australia)	GK	Ashley Maynard-Brewer	3	0	0	0	0	0	0	0	0	0	3	0
14	(England)	FW	Danny Hylton	1	0	0	0	1	0	0	0	1	0	3	0
11	(England)	FW	Miles Leaburn	2	0	0	0	0	0	0	0	0	0	2	0
17	(Republic of Ireland)	MF	Alex Gilbert	2	0	0	0	0	0	0	0	0	0	2	0
12	(Wales)	MF	Terry Taylor	1	0	0	0	0	0	0	0	1	0	2	0
17	(England)	DF	Tayo Edun	0	0	0	0	0	0	0	0	2	0	2	0
15	(England)	DF	Dan Potts	1	0	0	0	0	0	0	0	0	0	1	0
28	(Scotland)	MF	Allan Campbell	1	0	0	0	0	0	0	0	0	0	1	0
9	(Morocco)	FW	Gassan Ahadme	1	0	0	0	0	0	0	0	0	0	1	0
29	(Sierra Leone)	FW	Daniel Kanu	1	0	0	0	0	0	0	0	0	0	1	0
27	(England)	DF	Tennai Watson	1	0	0	0	0	0	0	0	0	0	1	0
36	(England)	MF	Henry Rylah	0	0	0	0	0	0	0	0	1	0	1	0
19	(Uganda)	DF	Nathan Asiimwe	0	0	0	0	0	0	0	0	1	0	1	0
Totals				91	2	4	0	5	0	2	0	11	1	113	3

== Transfers ==
=== Transfers in ===
Date from	Position	Nationality	Name	From	Fee	Ref.
19 June 2024	DF	(Scotland)	Josh Edwards	(Scotland) Dunfermline Athletic	Undisclosed	
24 June 2024	DF	(England)	Alex Mitchell	(England) Millwall	Undisclosed	
1 July 2024 (Note: The transfer of Luke Berry was announced on 17 June 2024 and would become official on 1 July 2024 once his Luton Town contract expired.)	MF	(England)	Luke Berry	(England) Luton Town	Free transfer	
1 July 2024 (Note: The transfer of Will Mannion was announced on 10 June 2024 and would become official on 1 July 2024 once his Cambridge United contract expired.)	GK	(England)	Will Mannion	(England) Cambridge United	Free transfer	
3 July 2024	FW	(England)	Matt Godden	(England) Coventry City	Undisclosed	
4 July 2024	SS	(Morocco)	Gassan Ahadme	(England) Ipswich Town	Undisclosed	
5 July 2024	MF	(Scotland)	Greg Docherty	(England) Hull City	Free transfer	
15 July 2024	GK	(England)	Lennon MacLorg	(England) Rochdale	Undisclosed	
23 August 2024	FW	(Jamaica)	Kaheim Dixon	(Jamaica) Arnett Gardens	Undisclosed	
6 September 2024	LB	(England)	Dan Potts	(England) Luton Town	Free transfer	
17 September 2024	GK	(England)	Tommy Reid	(England) Brighton & Hove Albion	Free transfer	
18 September 2024	FW	(England)	Danny Hylton	(England) Northampton Town	Free transfer	
22 March 2025	GK	(Australia)	Dean Bouzanis	(England) Reading	Free transfer	

=== Transfers out ===
Date from	Position	Nationality	Name	To	Fee	Ref.
14 June 2024	MF	(Scotland)	Conor McGrandles	(England) Lincoln City	Free transfer	
1 July 2024	GK	(Nigeria)	Prince Adegoke	(England) Wingate & Finchley	Released	
1 July 2024	MF	(England)	Jason Adigun	(England) Dagenham & Redbridge	Released	
1 July 2024	DF	(England)	Nazir Bakrin	(England) Tonbridge Angels	Released	
1 July 2024	GK	(England)	James Batt	(England) Bromley	Released	
1 July 2024	MF	(England)	Mikey Berry	(England) Ashford United	Released	
1 July 2024	LW	(England)	Corey Blackett-Taylor	(England) Derby County	Free transfer	
1 July 2024	DM	(England)	Richard Chin	(England) Farnborough	Released	
1 July 2024	DF	(Ghana)	David Danso	Free agent	Released	
1 July 2024	DF	(Australia)	Matt Dench	(Australia) Oakleigh Cannons	Released	
1 July 2024	CM	(England)	George Dobson	(Wales) Wrexham	Released	
1 July 2024	MF	(England)	Ralfi Hand	(England) Dulwich Hamlet	Released	
1 July 2024	CB	(Jamaica)	Michael Hector	(England) Dagenham & Redbridge	Released	
1 July 2024	RW	(England)	Diallang Jaiyesimi	(England) Leyton Orient	Released	
1 July 2024	FW	(England)	Tolu Ladapo	(England) Lewes	Released	
1 July 2024	LW	(Democratic Republic of the Congo)	Kazenga LuaLua	(England) Hartlepool United	Released	
1 July 2024	GK	(Republic of Ireland)	Henry Molyneux	(England) Sheffield United	Released	
1 July 2024	MF	(England)	Brook Myers	(England) Southampton	Released	
1 July 2024	FW	(United States)	Chibike Okechukwu	Free agent	Released	
1 July 2024	DF	(Germany)	Harmony Okwumo	(England) Norwich City	Released	
1 July 2024	AM	(England)	Jack Payne	(England) Colchester United	Released	
1 July 2024	LB	(England)	Jacob Roddy	(England) Oxford City	Released	
1 July 2024	MF	(Ecuador)	Jeremy Santos	(England) Tonbridge Angels	Released	
1 July 2024	CB	(Saint Lucia)	Terell Thomas	(England) Carlisle United	Released	
1 July 2024	FW	(Wales)	Ryan Viggars	(England) Buxton	Released	
1 July 2024	GK	(England)	Lewis Ward	(England) AFC Wimbledon	Released	
1 July 2024	CF	(England)	Connor Wickham	Free agent	Released	
1 July 2024	MF	(Northern Ireland)	Euan Williams	(England) Gillingham	Released	
1 July 2024	MF	(England)	Jadon Yamoah	Free agent	Released	
2 July 2024	FW	(England)	Alfie May	(England) Birmingham City	Undisclosed	
27 July 2024	GK	(England)	Harry Isted	(England) Burton Albion	Undisclosed	
22 August 2024	CB	(England)	Lucas Ness	(England) Notts County	Undisclosed	
31 August 2024	MF	(Scotland)	Scott Fraser	(Scotland) Dundee	Released	
16 January 2025	LB	(England)	Tayo Edun	(England) Peterborough United	Undisclosed	
28 January 2025	LB	(England)	Dan Potts	Free agent	Released	
3 February 2024	DF	(England)	Rarmani Edmonds-Green	(England) Leyton Orient	Undisclosed	

=== Loans in ===
Date from	Position	Nationality	Name	From	Date until	Ref.
26 August 2023	MF	(Scotland)	Allan Campbell	(England) Luton Town	30 January 2025	
3 February 2025	AM	(Republic of Ireland)	Alex Gilbert	(England) Middlesbrough	End of season	
3 February 2025	CB	(Scotland)	Tom McIntyre	(England) Portsmouth	End of season	

=== Loans out ===
Date from	Position	Nationality	Name	To	Date until	Ref.
9 July 2024	MF	(England)	Aaron Henry	(England) Rochdale	7 January 2025	
19 September 2024	DF	(Uganda)	Nathan Asiimwe	(England) Hartlepool United	29 October 2024	
10 January 2025	DF	(Uganda)	Nathan Asiimwe	(England) Walsall	End of season	
22 January 2025	MF	(Wales)	Terry Taylor	(England) Northampton Town	End of season	
3 February 2025	CB	(England)	Zach Mitchell	(Scotland) St Johnstone	End of season	

== Friendlies ==
On Friday 17 May 2024, Charlton announced their first pre-season friendly against Dartford. On Wednesday 5 June 2024, Charlton announced their second pre-season friendly against AFC Wimbledon. On 1 July 2024, Charlton announced their third and fourth pre-season friendlies against Göztepe - which would take place during their training camp in Slovenia - as well as a home match against Portsmouth. On Thursday 4 July 2024, Charlton announced their fifth and sixth pre-seasons matches against Millwall and Crystal Palace which would both be played behind closed doors.

6 July 2024 Friendly	Dartford	1–6	Charlton Athletic	Dartford
14:00 BST	Jones 39'	Report	T. Campbell 14', 42'; Asiimwe 23'; Kanu 24' (pen.); Watson 66'; Hylton 85'	Stadium: Princes Park; Attendance: 2,149; Referee: Nick Dunn
Note: Fixture was initially scheduled for a 15:00 kick-off, but was changed due to England's progression in UEFA Euro 2024.

13 July 2024 Friendly	Charlton Athletic	3–1	Göztepe	Kranjska Gora, Slovenia
12:00 BST	T. Campbell 11'; Kanu 16'; A. Mitchell 65'	Report	Sangaré 61'	Stadium: Kranjska Gora; Attendance: 0 Referee: Žnidaršič Andrej

16 July 2024 Friendly	Millwall	2–0	Charlton Athletic	Bromley
11:30 BST	Saville 10'; Emakhu 80'	Report		Stadium: Millwall Training Ground; Attendance: 0

19 July 2024 Friendly	Crystal Palace	1–1	Charlton Athletic	Beckenham
12:00 BST	Rak-Sakyi 90'	Report	Aneke 38'	Stadium: Crystal Palace Academy; Attendance: 0 Referee: Bruno Marques

27 July 2024 Friendly	AFC Wimbledon	2–0	Charlton Athletic	Wimbledon
15:00 BST	Johnson 65'; Kelly 79'	Report		Stadium: Cherry Red Records Stadium; Attendance: 3,156; Referee: Charles Breakspear

3 August 2024 Friendly	Charlton Athletic	2–0	Portsmouth	Charlton
15:00 BST	T. Campbell 9'; Ahadme 51'	Report		Stadium: The Valley; Attendance: 3,909; Referee: Farai Hallam

== Competitions ==
=== Overall record ===
Competition	First match	Last match	Starting round	Final position	Record							
Competition	First match	Last match	Starting round	Final position	Pld	W	D	L	GF	GA	GD	Win %
League One	10 August 2024	3 May 2025	Matchday 1	4th	46	25	10	11	67	43	+24	54.35
League One Play-Offs	11 May 2025	25 May 2025	Semi-final	Winners	3	2	1	0	2	0	+2	66.67
FA Cup	2 November 2024	14 January 2025	First round	Third round	3	2	0	1	9	5	+4	66.67
EFL Cup	13 August 2024	13 August 2024	First round	First round	1	0	0	1	0	1	−1	0.00
EFL Trophy	17 September 2024	10 December 2024	Group stage	Second round	4	3	0	1	6	3	+3	75.00
Total					57	32	11	14	84	52	+32	56.14

Last updated: 25 May 2025
Source: Soccerway

=== League One ===
==== League table ====
Pos	Team	Pld	W	D	L	GF	GA	GD	Pts	Promotion, qualification or relegation
2	Wrexham (P)	46	27	11	8	67	34	+33	92	Promotion to EFL Championship
3	Stockport County	46	25	12	9	72	42	+30	87	Qualification for League One play-offs
4	Charlton Athletic (O, P)	46	25	10	11	67	43	+24	85	Qualification for League One play-offs
5	Wycombe Wanderers	46	24	12	10	70	45	+25	84	Qualification for League One play-offs
6	Leyton Orient	46	24	6	16	72	48	+24	78	Qualification for League One play-offs

Source: EFL Official Website
Rules for classification: 1) Points; 2) Goal difference; 3) Number of goals scored; 4) Head-to-head results; 5) Wins; 6) Away goals; 7) Penalty points (sec 9.5); 8) 12-point sending off offences
(O) Play-off winners; (P) Promoted

==== Result summary ====
Overall								Home						Away					
Pld	W	D	L	GF	GA	GD	Pts	W	D	L	GF	GA	GD	W	D	L	GF	GA	GD
46	25	10	11	67	43	+24	85	15	6	2	38	16	+22	10	4	9	29	27	+2

Last updated: 3 May 2025.

==== Results by round ====
Round	1	2	3	4	5	6	7	8	9	10	11	12	13	14	15	16	17	18	19	20	21	22	23	24	25	26	27	28	29	30	31	32	33	34	35	36	37	38	39	40	41	42	43	44	45	46
Ground	A	H	H	A	H	A	H	A	A	H	H	A	H	A	A	A	H	A	H	A	H	H	H	A	A	H	H	A	H	H	A	H	A	H	A	A	H	A	H	A	H	A	H	A	A	H
Result	W	W	W	L	D	W	L	L	L	W	D	D	D	L	L	W	L	D	D	W	W	W	D	L	W	W	W	D	W	W	L	W	W	W	D	W	W	L	W	W	D	W	W	W	L	W
Position	8	4	3	6	5	2	4	8	13	8	12	11	11	13	14	12	12	12	14	11	11	9	11	12	10	10	8	7	6	5	7	7	6	5	5	4	4	4	4	4	5	5	4	4	5	4
Points	3	6	9	9	10	13	13	13	13	16	17	18	19	19	19	22	22	23	24	27	30	33	34	34	37	40	43	44	47	50	50	53	56	59	60	63	66	66	69	72	73	76	79	82	82	85

Updated to match(es) played on 3 May 2025. Source:
A = Away; H = Home; W = Win; D = Draw; L = Loss; P = postponed

==== Matches ====
The 2024–25 season fixtures were released on Wednesday 26 June 2024.

10 August 2024 1	Wigan Athletic	0–1	Charlton Athletic	Wigan
17:30 BST		Report	Jones 81'	Stadium: Brick Community Stadium; Attendance: 9,564; Referee: Adam Herczeg
Note: Live on Sky Sports+

17 August 2024 2	Charlton Athletic	1–0	Leyton Orient	Charlton
12:30 BST	Berry 90+2'	Report		Stadium: The Valley; Attendance: 15,126; Referee: Edward Duckworth
Note: Live on Sky Sports+

24 August 2024 3	Charlton Athletic	2–0	Bolton Wanderers	Charlton
15:00 BST	Docherty 10'; Godden 88'	Report		Stadium: The Valley; Attendance: 14,365; Referee: Lee Swabey

31 August 2024 4	Reading	2–0	Charlton Athletic	Reading
15:00 BST	Savage 66'; Smith 76'	Report		Stadium: Select Car Leasing Stadium; Attendance: 14,778; Referee: Thomas Kirk

7 September 2024 5	Charlton Athletic	1–1	Rotherham United	Charlton
15:00 BST	Aneke 72'	Report	Kelly 58'	Stadium: The Valley; Attendance: 13,569; Referee: Simon Mather

14 September 2024 6	Shrewsbury Town	0–1	Charlton Athletic	Shrewsbury
15:00 BST		Report	Ahadme 50'	Stadium: The Croud Meadow; Attendance: 6,171; Referee: Sebastian Stockbridge

21 September 2024 7	Charlton Athletic	1–2	Blackpool	Charlton
15:00 BST	Berry 90+6'	Report	Joseph 27'; Morgan 32'	Stadium: The Valley; Attendance: 14,149; Referee: Charles Breakspear

28 September 2024 8	Stevenage	1–0	Charlton Athletic	Stevenage
15:00 BST	Roberts 67'	Report		Stadium: The Lamex Stadium; Attendance: 4,701; Referee: Scott Tallis

1 October 2024 9	Bristol Rovers	3–2	Charlton Athletic	Bristol
19:45 BST	Sinclair 30'; Lindsay 57'; Wilson 67'	Report	A. Mitchell 79'; Godden 90+4'	Stadium: Memorial Stadium; Attendance: 6,638; Referee: David Rock

5 October 2024 10	Charlton Athletic	1–0	Birmingham City	Charlton
15:00 BST	Godden 54'	Report		Stadium: The Valley; Attendance: 16,250; Referee: Benjamin Speedie

19 October 2024 11	Charlton Athletic	1–1	Stockport County	Charlton
15:00 BST	Edmonds-Green 66'	Report	Barry 12' (pen.)	Stadium: The Valley; Attendance: 13,711; Referee: Tom Reeves

22 October 2024 12	Barnsley	2–2	Charlton Athletic	Barnsley
19:45 BST	Keillor-Dunn 34'; Watters 90+5'	Report	Berry 77', 90+3'	Stadium: Oakwell; Attendance: 12,441; Referee: Lewis Smith

26 October 2024 13	Charlton Athletic	2–2	Wrexham	Charlton
15:00 BST	Gillesphey 23'; Godden 90+7' (pen.)	Report	Coventry 16' (o.g.); Cannon 72'	Stadium: The Valley; Attendance: 24,692; Referee: Sam Purkiss

9 November 2024 14	Exeter City	1–0	Charlton Athletic	Exeter
15:00 GMT	Crama 59'	Report		Stadium: St James Park; Attendance: 7,347; Referee: Matt Corlett

23 November 2024 15	Huddersfield Town	2–1	Charlton Athletic	Huddersfield
15:00 GMT	Pearson 13'; Kasumu 63'	Report	Godden 32' (pen.)	Stadium: John Smith's Stadium; Attendance: 18,550; Referee: Simon Mather

26 November 2024 16	Burton Albion	0–1	Charlton Athletic	Burton upon Trent
19:45 GMT		Report	Coventry 82'	Stadium: Pirelli Stadium; Attendance: 1,749; Referee: Elliot Bell

3 December 2024 17	Charlton Athletic	1–2	Crawley Town	Charlton
19:45 GMT	Kanu 68'	Report	Showunmi 33'; Anderson 80'	Stadium: The Valley; Attendance: 11,427; Referee: Jacob Miles

7 December 2024 18	Lincoln City	0–0	Charlton Athletic	Lincoln
12:30 GMT		Report		Stadium: LNER Stadium; Attendance: 8,307; Referee: Paul Howard
Note: Live on Sky Sports+

14 December 2024 19	Charlton Athletic	0–0	Mansfield Town	Charlton
15:00 GMT		Report		Stadium: The Valley; Attendance: 14,132; Referee: Benjamin Speedie

21 December 2024 20	Northampton Town	0–5	Charlton Athletic	Northampton
15:00 GMT		Report	Docherty 9', 68'; T. Campbell 13'; Leaburn 36'; Hylton 90+1'	Stadium: Sixfields Stadium; Attendance: 7,015; Referee: Ben Toner

26 December 2024 21	Charlton Athletic	2–1	Cambridge United	Charlton
15:00 GMT	T. Campbell 1'; Leaburn 20'	Report	Kachunga 51'	Stadium: The Valley; Attendance: 14,369; Referee: David Rock
Note: Live on Sky Sports Football

29 December 2024 22	Charlton Athletic	2–1	Wycombe Wanderers	Charlton
12:30 GMT	Leaburn 46', 52'	Report	Kone 84'	Stadium: The Valley; Attendance: 15,544; Referee: Lee Swabey
Note: Live on Sky Sports+

4 January 2025 23	Charlton Athletic	0–0	Reading	Charlton
15:00 GMT		Report		Stadium: The Valley; Attendance: 15,526; Referee: Scott Oldham

18 January 2025 24	Rotherham United	4–2	Charlton Athletic	Rotherham
15:00 GMT	Green 9'; MacDonald 14'; Jules 45+4'; Wilks 53'	Report	Leaburn 45'; Godden 90+2'	Stadium: AESSEAL New York Stadium; Attendance: 9,589; Referee: Darren Drysdale

21 January 2025 25	Bolton Wanderers	1–2	Charlton Athletic	Horwich
19:45 GMT	Randall 55'	Report	Jones 71'; Anderson 86'	Stadium: Toughsheet Community Stadium; Attendance: 18,477; Referee: Jacob Miles

25 January 2025 26	Charlton Athletic	1–0	Shrewsbury Town	Charlton
15:00 GMT	Small 90+6'	Report		Stadium: The Valley; Attendance: 12,999; Referee: Scott Tallis

28 January 2025 27	Charlton Athletic	2–0	Bristol Rovers	Charlton
19:45 GMT	Godden 13'; Edwards 36'	Report		Stadium: The Valley; Attendance: 11,149; Referee: Farai Hallam

1 February 2025 28	Blackpool	2–2	Charlton Athletic	Blackpool
15:00 GMT	Silvera 74'; Ennis 87'	Report	Godden 52'; Casey 54' (o.g.)	Stadium: Bloomfield Road; Attendance: 9,462; Referee: Thomas Parsons

8 February 2025 29	Charlton Athletic	2–0	Stevenage	Charlton
12:30 GMT	Godden 44'; Berry 48'	Report		Stadium: The Valley; Attendance: 14,093; Referee: Josh Smith
Note: Live on Sky Sports+

11 February 2025 30	Charlton Athletic	2–1	Peterborough United	Charlton
19:45 GMT	Godden 54' (pen.); Gillesphey 89'	Report	Mothersille 63' (pen.)	Stadium: The Valley; Attendance: 11,653; Referee: Lee Swabey

15 February 2025 31	Birmingham City	1–0	Charlton Athletic	Birmingham
15:00 GMT	Stansfield 23'	Report		Stadium: St. Andrew's @ Knighthead Park; Attendance: 25,542; Referee: Sebastian Stockbridge

22 February 2025 32	Charlton Athletic	3–0	Exeter City	Charlton
15:00 GMT	MacDonald 20' (o.g.); T. Campbell 68'; Leaburn 84'	Report		Stadium: The Valley; Attendance: 14,864; Referee: Andy Davies

1 March 2025 33	Leyton Orient	1–2	Charlton Athletic	Leyton
15:00 GMT	Brown 50'	Report	Gillesphey 90+2'; Ramsay 90+7'	Stadium: Gaughan Group Stadium; Attendance: 8,942; Referee: Tom Reeves

4 March 2025 34	Charlton Athletic	1–0	Barnsley	Charlton
19:45 GMT	Gillesphey 12'	Report		Stadium: The Valley; Attendance: 12,707; Referee: Carl Brook

8 March 2025 35	Stockport County	0–0	Charlton Athletic	Stockport
12:30 GMT		Report		Stadium: Edgeley Park; Attendance: 10,338; Referee: Martin Coy
Note: Live on Sky Sports+

11 March 2025 36	Crawley Town	0–1	Charlton Athletic	Crawley
19:45 GMT		Report	Small 37'	Stadium: The Checkatrade.com Stadium; Attendance: 5,489; Referee: Matthew Russell

15 March 2025 37	Charlton Athletic	2–1	Wigan Athletic	Charlton
15:00 GMT	Godden 11', 38'	Report	Sze 84'	Stadium: The Valley; Attendance: 16,491; Referee: Graham Scott

22 March 2025 38	Peterborough United	3–0	Charlton Athletic	Peterborough
15:00 GMT	Hughes 38'; Odoh 43'; Mothersille 79'	Report		Stadium: Weston Homes Stadium; Attendance: 10,231; Referee: Scott Tallis

29 March 2025 39	Charlton Athletic	4–0	Huddersfield Town	Charlton
12:30 GMT	Godden 1'; T. Campbell 17', 53'; Nicholls 60' (o.g.)	Report		Stadium: The Valley; Attendance: 17,278; Referee: Declan Bourne
Note: Live on Sky Sports+

1 April 2025 40	Mansfield Town	1–2	Charlton Athletic	Mansfield
19:45 BST	Craig 40'	Report	Godden 22'; T. Campbell 74'	Stadium: One Call Stadium; Attendance: 7,517; Referee: James Bell

5 April 2025 41	Charlton Athletic	2–2	Lincoln City	Charlton
15:00 BST	Gillesphey 56'; Docherty 75'	Report	Collins 17', 49'	Stadium: The Valley; Attendance: 15,611; Referee: Leigh Doughty

12 April 2025 42	Cambridge United	0–1	Charlton Athletic	Cambridge
15:00 BST		Report	T. Campbell 14'	Stadium: Cledara Abbey Stadium; Attendance: 6,707; Referee: James Durkin

18 April 2025 43	Charlton Athletic	2–1	Northampton Town	Charlton
15:00 BST	Berry 9'; Godden 71'	Report	Costelloe 15' (pen.)	Stadium: The Valley; Attendance: 20,198; Referee: Ollie Yates

21 April 2025 44	Wycombe Wanderers	0–4	Charlton Athletic	High Wycombe
15:00 BST		Report	Jones 11'; Berry 24'; Godden 58'; Anderson 62'	Stadium: Adams Park; Attendance: 8,084; Referee: Will Finnie

26 April 2025 45	Wrexham	3–0	Charlton Athletic	Wrexham
17:30 BST	Rathbone 15'; Smith 18', 81'	Report		Stadium: STōK Racecourse; Attendance: 12,774; Referee: Ben Toner
Note: Live on Sky Sports

3 May 2025 46	Charlton Athletic	3–1	Burton Albion	Charlton
15:00 BST	Godden 24', 34'; A. Mitchell 51'	Report	Bennett 13' (pen.)	Stadium: The Valley; Attendance: 20,971; Referee: Sam Purkiss

=== League One play-offs ===
11 May 2025 Semi-final First leg	Wycombe Wanderers	0–0	Charlton Athletic	High Wycombe
18:30 BST		Report		Stadium: Adams Park; Attendance: 6,585; Referee: Farai Hallam
Note: Live on Sky Sports

15 May 2025 Semi-final Second leg	Charlton Athletic	1–0 (1–0 agg.)	Wycombe Wanderers	Charlton
20:00 BST	Godden 81'	Report		Stadium: The Valley; Attendance: 25,722; Referee: Dean Whitestone
Note: Live on Sky Sports

25 May 2025 Final	Charlton Athletic	1–0	Leyton Orient	Wembley
13:01 BST	Gillesphey 31'	Report		Stadium: Wembley Stadium; Attendance: 76,193; Referee: Andrew Kitchen
Note: Live on Sky Sports

=== FA Cup ===
The first round draw was made on Monday 14 October 2024. On Wednesday 23 October 2024, the club confirmed the date of their first round fixture. The second round draw was made on Sunday 3 November 2024. On Thursday 7 November 2024, the club confirmed the date of their second round fixture. The third round draw was made on Monday 2 December 2024. On Friday 6 December 2024, the club confirmed the date of their third round fixture. On 10 January 2025, it was announced that the third round tie would be postponed until Tuesday 14 January 2025 due to a frozen playing surface.

2 November 2024 First round	Southend United	3–4 (a.e.t.)	Charlton Athletic	Southend-on-Sea
15:00 GMT	Bridge 45+1' (pen.); Coker 52'; Edwards 90+3' (o.g.)	Report	Leaburn 9'; Z. Mitchell 40'; Godden 66'; Ahadme 120+1'	Stadium: Roots Hall; Attendance: 8,875; Referee: Darren Drysdale

30 November 2024 Second round	Walsall	0–4	Charlton Athletic	Walsall
15:00 GMT		Report	Ahadme 16', 85'; Godden 28'; T. Campbell 90+2'	Stadium: Poundland Bescot Stadium; Attendance: 6,161; Referee: Ollie Yates

14 January 2025 Third round	Preston North End	2–1	Charlton Athletic	Preston
19:45 GMT	Osmajić 32', 47'	Report	Berry 40'	Stadium: Deepdale; Attendance: 7,734; Referee: Ruebyn Ricardo

=== EFL Cup ===
The first round draw was made on Thursday 27 June 2024. On Thursday 4 July 2024, the date of the first round was announced.

13 August 2024 First round	Charlton Athletic	0–1	Birmingham City	Charlton
19:45 BST		Report	Khela 32'	Stadium: The Valley; Attendance: 5,899; Referee: Alex Chilowicz
Note: Live on Sky Sports+

=== EFL Trophy ===
The regional group stage draw was confirmed on Monday 24 June 2024 and saw Charlton Athletic placed in Southern Group C, alongside Bromley and Cambridge United. On Thursday 27 June 2024, it was confirmed that the final team in the group would be Chelsea U21. On Friday 26 July 2024, the dates for the group stage fixtures were confirmed. On Friday 22 November 2024, the second round draw was made. On Wednesday 27 November 2024, the date for the second round tie was announced.

==== Group stage ====
Pos	Div	Team	Pld	W	PW	PL	L	GF	GA	GD	Pts	Qualification
1	L1	Charlton Athletic	3	3	0	0	0	6	1	+5	9	Advance to Round 2
2	L1	Cambridge United	3	1	0	1	1	5	5	0	4	Advance to Round 2
3	ACA	Chelsea U21	3	1	0	0	2	3	6	−3	3	
4	L2	Bromley	3	0	1	0	2	5	7	−2	2	

Source: EFL

17 September 2024 Group stage 1	Cambridge United	1–2	Charlton Athletic	Cambridge
19:00 BST	Nlundulu 44' (pen.)	Report	Edun 24'; Godden 30'	Stadium: Cledara Abbey Stadium; Attendance: 1,028; Referee: Carl Brook

29 October 2024 Group stage 2	Charlton Athletic	3–0	Chelsea U21	Charlton
19:00 GMT	Leaburn 10', 52'; T. Campbell 90+4'	Report		Stadium: The Valley; Attendance: 2,004; Referee: Jamie O'Connor

12 November 2024 Group stage 3	Charlton Athletic	1–0	Bromley	Charlton
19:00 GMT	Leaburn 70'	Report		Stadium: The Valley; Attendance: 2,916; Referee: Ben Atkinson

==== Knockout stage ====
10 December 2024 Second round	Charlton Athletic	0–2	Leyton Orient	Charlton
19:00 GMT		Report	Kelman 90+3'; Agyei 90+5'	Stadium: The Valley; Attendance: 1,336; Referee: Stephen Parkinson

=== London Senior Cup ===
5 November 2024 Second round	Fisher	1–6	Charlton Athletic	Rotherhithe
19:45 GMT	Clarke 47' (pen.)	Report	Rylah 8'; Bower 40', 58'; Brown 65'; Tagoe 77'; Fullah 86'	Stadium: St Paul's Sports Ground; Attendance: 309; Referee: Robert Maris

26 November 2024 Third round	Wingate & Finchley	2–9	Charlton Athletic	Finchley
19:45 GMT	Drakes-Thomas 51', 63'	Report	Enslin 5', 57'; Asiimwe 27'; Dixon 67', 75', 77', 90+2'; Fullah 71'; Safa 88'	Stadium: The Maurice Rebak Stadium; Attendance: 62; Referee: James Keane

25 February 2025 Quarter-finals	Dulwich Hamlet	2–0	Charlton Athletic	East Dulwich
19:45 GMT	Wanadio 40', 48' (pen.)	Report		Stadium: Champion Hill; Attendance: 460; Referee: Deryll David
