= 2023–24 Charlton Athletic F.C. season =

Charlton Athletic
2023–24 season
- Chairman: Thomas Sandgaard (until 21 July); SE7 Partners (from 21 July)
- Manager: Dean Holden (until 27 August 2023); Jason Pearce (caretaker) (from 27 August 2023 until 8 September 2023); Michael Appleton (from 8 September 2023 until 23 January 2024); Curtis Fleming (caretaker) (from 24 January 2024 until 4 February 2024); Nathan Jones (from 4 February 2024)
- Stadium: The Valley
- League One: 16th
- FA Cup: Second round (vs. Gillingham)
- EFL Cup: First round (vs. Newport County)
- EFL Trophy: Second round (vs. Reading)
- Top goalscorer: League: Alfie May (23); All: Alfie May (27)
- Highest home attendance: 18,512 (vs. Leyton Orient, 5 August 2023)
- Lowest home attendance: 1,273 (vs. Aston Villa U21, 10 October 2023)
- Average home league attendance: 13,481
Home colours	Away colours	Third colours

The 2023–24 Charlton Athletic season was the club's 118th season in their existence, having been founded in 1905, and their fourth consecutive season in League One. The club participated in League One, the FA Cup, the EFL Cup and the EFL Trophy. The season covered the period from 1 July 2023 to 30 June 2024.

== Kit ==
Sportswear manufacturers Castore remained Kit suppliers. with sponsorship of Home and third shirts being RSK Group whilst the away shirt sponsor was the University of Greenwich.

== Squad statistics ==
As of 27 April 2024

No.	Pos	Nat	Player	Total		League One		FA Cup		League Cup		EFL Trophy	
No.	Pos	Nat	Player	Apps	Goals	Apps	Goals	Apps	Goals	Apps	Goals	Apps	Goals
1	GK	(Australia) AUS	Ashley Maynard-Brewer	28	0	25+0	0	1+0	0	0+0	0	2+0	0
2	DF	(England) ENG	Lloyd Jones	36	2	30+2	2	2+0	0	0+0	0	1+1	0
3	DF	(Saint Lucia) LCA	Terell Thomas	43	0	31+9	0	1+0	0	0+1	0	0+1	0
4	MF	(England) ENG	George Dobson	48	4	43+0	2	2+0	1	0+0	0	2+1	1
5	DF	(England) ENG	Lucas Ness	21	0	9+5	0	3+0	0	1+0	0	3+0	0
6	DF	(Jamaica) JAM	Michael Hector	36	0	28+6	0	0+0	0	1+0	0	1+0	0
7	MF	(England) ENG	Diallang Jaiyesimi	1	0	0+1	0	0+0	0	0+0	0	0+0	0
8	MF	(Guinea-Bissau) GBS	Panutche Camará (on loan from Ipswich Town)	13	0	5+7	0	0+0	0	1+0	0	0+0	0
9	FW	(England) ENG	Alfie May	50	27	40+3	23	2+1	2	0+1	0	1+2	2
10	MF	(Scotland) SCO	Scott Fraser	22	1	9+7	0	2+1	1	0+0	0	3+0	0
11	FW	(England) ENG	Miles Leaburn	18	7	9+4	3	1+1	1	0+0	0	3+0	3
12	MF	(Wales) WAL	Terry Taylor	7	0	2+3	0	0+0	0	0+1	0	1+0	0
13	DF	(Republic of Ireland) IRL	James Abankwah (on loan from Udinese)	3	0	2+0	0	1+0	0	0+0	0	0+0	0
13	FW	(England) ENG	Connor Wickham	4	1	2+2	1	0+0	0	0+0	0	0+0	0
14	MF	(England) ENG	Charlie Kirk	8	1	0+4	0	1+0	0	1+0	0	2+0	1
14	FW	(England) ENG	Freddie Ladapo (on loan from Ipswich Town)	14	1	8+6	1	0+0	0	0+0	0	0+0	0
15	MF	(England) ENG	Aaron Henry	0	0	0+0	0	0+0	0	0+0	0	0+0	0
16	MF	(Scotland) SCO	Conor McGrandles	7	2	2+1	1	2+0	0	1+0	0	1+0	1
17	DF	(England) ENG	Tayo Edun	33	0	21+5	0	3+0	0	1+0	0	3+0	0
18	DF	(England) ENG	Tennai Watson	40	1	33+1	1	0+3	0	0+0	0	2+1	0
19	MF	(England) ENG	Jack Payne	4	0	2+1	0	0+0	0	1+0	0	0+0	0
20	MF	(Jamaica) JAM	Tyreece Campbell	40	4	12+21	2	1+1	1	0+1	0	4+0	1
21	GK	(England) ENG	Harry Isted	23	0	21+0	0	0+0	0	1+0	0	1+0	0
22	FW	(England) ENG	Chuks Aneke	18	2	2+15	2	0+0	0	0+0	0	0+1	0
23	MF	(England) ENG	Corey Blackett-Taylor	28	9	25+0	8	2+0	0	0+0	0	1+0	1
24	DF	(England) ENG	Zach Mitchell	1	0	0+0	0	0+0	0	1+0	0	0+0	0
25	MF	(Republic of Ireland) IRL	Louie Watson (on loan from Luton Town)	27	1	8+13	0	1+1	0	0+0	0	4+0	1
26	DF	(England) ENG	Deji Elerewe	4	0	1+1	0	0+0	0	0+0	0	2+0	0
26	DF	(England) ENG	Thierry Small	14	1	14+0	1	0+0	0	0+0	0	0+0	0
27	FW	(Wales) WAL	Chem Campbell (on loan from Wolverhampton Wanderers)	16	2	9+3	2	1+1	0	0+0	0	1+1	0
27	DF	(England) ENG	Macaulay Gillesphey	17	0	14+3	0	0+0	0	0+0	0	0+0	0
28	DF	(England) ENG	Richard Chin	2	0	0+0	0	0+0	0	1+0	0	1+0	0
29	FW	(Sierra Leone) SLE	Daniel Kanu	34	7	20+10	6	0+1	0	1+0	1	0+2	0
30	FW	(Serbia) SRB	Slobodan Tedić (on loan from Manchester City)	17	2	4+8	2	2+0	0	0+0	0	0+3	0
30	MF	(England) ENG	Tyreeq Bakinson (on loan from Sheffield Wednesday)	15	1	10+5	1	0+0	0	0+0	0	0+0	0
31	GK	(Republic of Ireland) IRL	Henry Molyneux	0	0	0+0	0	0+0	0	0+0	0	0+0	0
32	DF	(Uganda) UGA	Nathan Asiimwe	23	0	9+8	0	2+1	0	0+0	0	2+1	0
33	MF	(Jamaica) JAM	Karoy Anderson	28	2	24+1	2	1+0	0	0+1	0	0+1	0
34	MF	(Ecuador) ECU	Jeremy Santos	0	0	0+0	0	0+0	0	0+0	0	0+0	0
35	DF	(England) ENG	Nazir Bakrin	0	0	0+0	0	0+0	0	0+0	0	0+0	0
36	MF	(England) ENG	Henry Rylah	3	0	1+1	0	0+0	0	0+0	0	1+0	0
37	DF	(England) ENG	Jacob Roddy	1	0	0+0	0	0+0	0	0+0	0	0+1	0
38	MF	(England) ENG	Harvey Kedwell	3	0	0+0	0	0+1	0	0+0	0	0+2	0
39	DF	(Fiji) FIJ	Josh Laqeretabua	2	0	0+0	0	0+0	0	0+0	0	1+1	0
40	GK	(England) ENG	Sam Walker	3	0	0+0	0	2+0	0	0+0	0	1+0	0
40	MF	(Republic of Ireland) IRL	Conor Coventry	17	0	16+1	0	0+0	0	0+0	0	0+0	0
41	GK	(Nigeria) NGR	Prince Adegoke	0	0	0+0	0	0+0	0	0+0	0	0+0	0
42	FW	(England) ENG	Micah Mbick	5	1	0+2	0	0+2	1	0+0	0	0+1	0
44	DF	(England) ENG	Toby Bower	0	0	0+0	0	0+0	0	0+0	0	0+0	0
45	FW	(Republic of Ireland) IRL	Patrick Casey	1	0	0+1	0	0+0	0	0+0	0	0+0	0
46	MF	(Scotland) SCO	Lewis Fiorini (on loan from Manchester City)	5	0	0+5	0	0+0	0	0+0	0	0+0	0
47	DF	(England) ENG	Rarmani Edmonds-Green	14	0	12+2	0	0+0	0	0+0	0	0+0	0
48	GK	(England) ENG	Lewis Ward	0	0	0+0	0	0+0	0	0+0	0	0+0	0
49	MF	(Democratic Republic of the Congo) COD	Kazenga LuaLua	4	0	0+4	0	0+0	0	0+0	0	0+0	0
66	DF	(England) ENG	Kayne Ramsay	7	0	3+4	0	0+0	0	0+0	0	0+0	0
—	MF	(Northern Ireland) NIR	Euan Williams	0	0	0+0	0	0+0	0	0+0	0	0+0	0
—	FW	(England) ENG	Tolu Ladapo	0	0	0+0	0	0+0	0	0+0	0	0+0	0
—	FW	(Wales) WAL	Ryan Viggars	0	0	0+0	0	0+0	0	0+0	0	0+0	0

=== Top scorers ===
As of 27 April 2024

Place	Position	Nation	Number	Name	League One	FA Cup	League Cup	EFL Trophy	Total
1	FW	(England)	9	Alfie May	23	2	0	2	27
2	MF	(England)	23	Corey Blackett-Taylor	8	0	0	1	9
3	FW	(Sierra Leone)	29	Daniel Kanu	6	0	1	0	7
=	FW	(England)	11	Miles Leaburn	3	1	0	3	7
5	MF	(Jamaica)	20	Tyreece Campbell	2	1	0	1	4
=	MF	(England)	4	George Dobson	2	1	0	1	4
7	FW	(Serbia)	30	Slobodan Tedić	2	0	0	0	2
=	FW	(England)	27	Chem Campbell	2	0	0	0	2
=	DF	(England)	2	Lloyd Jones	2	0	0	0	2
=	MF	(Jamaica)	33	Karoy Anderson	2	0	0	0	2
=	FW	(England)	22	Chuks Aneke	2	0	0	0	2
=	MF	(Scotland)	16	Conor McGrandles	1	0	0	1	2
13	DF	(England)	18	Tennai Watson	1	0	0	0	1
=	FW	(England)	14	Freddie Ladapo	1	0	0	0	1
=	DF	(England)	26	Thierry Small	1	0	0	0	1
=	MF	(England)	30	Tyreeq Bakinson	1	0	0	0	1
=	FW	(England)	13	Connor Wickham	1	0	0	0	1
=	MF	(Scotland)	10	Scott Fraser	0	1	0	0	1
=	FW	(England)	42	Micah Mbick	0	1	0	0	1
=	MF	(England)	14	Charlie Kirk	0	0	0	1	1
=	MF	(Republic of Ireland)	25	Louie Watson	0	0	0	1	1
Own goals					4	0	0	0	4
Totals					64	7	1	11	83

=== Disciplinary record ===
As of 27 April 2024

Number	Nation	Position	Name	League One		FA Cup		League Cup		EFL Trophy		Total	
Number	Nation	Position	Name	Booked	Sent off (straight red)	Booked	Sent off (straight red)	Booked	Sent off (straight red)	Booked	Sent off (straight red)	Booked	Sent off (straight red)
4	(England)	MF	George Dobson	12	0	1	0	0	0	0	0	13	0
2	(England)	DF	Lloyd Jones	10	0	0	0	0	0	0	0	10	0
3	(Saint Lucia)	DF	Terell Thomas	9	0	0	0	0	0	0	0	9	0
9	(England)	FW	Alfie May	8	0	1	0	0	0	0	0	9	0
33	(Jamaica)	MF	Karoy Anderson	8	0	0	0	0	0	0	0	8	0
6	(Jamaica)	DF	Michael Hector	7	0	0	0	1	0	0	0	8	0
17	(England)	DF	Tayo Edun	6	1	0	0	0	0	0	0	6	1
30	(England)	MF	Tyreeq Bakinson	5	0	0	0	0	0	0	0	5	0
30	(Serbia)	FW	Slobodan Tedić	4	0	0	0	0	0	1	0	5	0
1	(Australia)	GK	Ashley Maynard-Brewer	4	0	0	0	0	0	0	0	4	0
29	(Sierra Leone)	FW	Daniel Kanu	4	0	0	0	0	0	0	0	4	0
40	(Republic of Ireland)	MF	Conor Coventry	4	0	0	0	0	0	0	0	4	0
25	(Republic of Ireland)	MF	Louie Watson	3	0	0	0	0	0	1	0	4	0
47	(England)	DF	Rarmani Edmonds-Green	3	0	0	0	0	0	0	0	3	0
22	(England)	FW	Chuks Aneke	3	0	0	0	0	0	0	0	3	0
19	(England)	MF	Jack Payne	2	0	0	0	0	0	0	0	2	0
23	(England)	MF	Corey Blackett-Taylor	2	0	0	0	0	0	0	0	2	0
10	(Scotland)	MF	Scott Fraser	2	0	0	0	0	0	0	0	2	0
14	(England)	FW	Freddie Ladapo	2	0	0	0	0	0	0	0	2	0
18	(England)	DF	Tennai Watson	2	0	0	0	0	0	0	0	2	0
21	(England)	GK	Harry Isted	2	0	0	0	0	0	0	0	2	0
66	(England)	DF	Kayne Ramsay	2	0	0	0	0	0	0	0	2	0
5	(England)	DF	Lucas Ness	1	0	1	0	0	0	0	0	2	0
32	(Uganda)	DF	Nathan Asiimwe	1	0	0	0	0	0	0	0	1	0
12	(Wales)	MF	Terry Taylor	1	0	0	0	0	0	0	0	1	0
20	(Jamaica)	MF	Tyreece Campbell	1	0	0	0	0	0	0	0	1	0
11	(England)	FW	Miles Leaburn	1	0	0	0	0	0	0	0	1	0
27	(England)	FW	Chem Campbell	1	0	0	0	0	0	0	0	1	0
8	(Guinea-Bissau)	MF	Panutche Camará	1	0	0	0	0	0	0	0	1	0
27	(England)	DF	Macaulay Gillesphey	1	0	0	0	0	0	0	0	1	0
26	(England)	DF	Thierry Small	1	0	0	0	0	0	0	0	1	0
46	(Scotland)	MF	Lewis Fiorini	1	0	0	0	0	0	0	0	1	0
40	(England)	GK	Sam Walker	0	0	1	0	0	0	0	0	1	0
39	(Fiji)	DF	Josh Laqeretabua	0	0	0	0	0	0	1	0	1	0
Totals				114	1	4	0	1	0	3	0	122	1

== Transfers ==
=== Transfers in ===
Date from	Position	Nationality	Name	From	Fee	Ref.
1 July 2023 (Note: The transfer of Harry Isted was announced on 24 June 2023 and would become official on 1 July 2023 once his Luton Town contract expired.)	GK	(England)	Harry Isted	(England) Luton Town	Free transfer	
1 July 2023 (Note: The transfer of Lloyd Jones was announced on 30 June 2023 and would become official on 1 July 2023 once his Cambridge United contract expired.)	DF	(England)	Lloyd Jones	(England) Cambridge United	Free transfer	
7 July 2023	FW	(England)	Alfie May	(England) Cheltenham Town	Undisclosed	
25 July 2023	LB	(England)	Tayo Edun	(England) Blackburn Rovers	Undisclosed	
26 July 2023	MF	(Wales)	Terry Taylor	(England) Burton Albion	Undisclosed	
21 August 2023	GK	(Nigeria)	Prince Adegoke	(England) Chelsea	Free transfer	
1 September 2023	RB	(England)	Tennai Watson	(England) Milton Keynes Dons	Free transfer	
16 October 2023	GK	(England)	Sam Walker	(Scotland) Kilmarnock	Free transfer	
12 January 2024	MF	(Republic of Ireland)	Conor Coventry	(England) West Ham United	Undisclosed	
12 January 2024	CB	(England)	Macaulay Gillesphey	(England) Plymouth Argyle	Undisclosed	
19 January 2024	DF	(England)	Rarmani Edmonds-Green	(England) Huddersfield Town	Undisclosed	
22 January 2024	GK	(England)	Lewis Ward	(England) Swindon Town	Free transfer	
1 February 2024	DF	(England)	Kayne Ramsay	(England) Harrogate Town	Undisclosed	
2 February 2024	LB	(England)	Thierry Small	(England) Southampton	Free transfer	
8 March 2024	FW	(England)	Connor Wickham	(Wales) Cardiff City	Free transfer	
15 March 2024	LW	(Democratic Republic of the Congo)	Kazenga LuaLua	(Greece) Levadiakos	Free transfer	

=== Transfers out ===
Date from	Position	Nationality	Name	To	Fee	Ref.
1 July 2023	DF	(England)	Charlie Barker	(England) Wealdstone	Released	
1 July 2023	CF	(Zimbabwe)	Macauley Bonne	(England) Gillingham	Released	
1 July 2023	RB	(England)	Sean Clare	(England) Wigan Athletic	Released	
1 July 2023	DF	(England)	Billy French	(England) Tonbridge Angels	Released	
1 July 2023	CF	(Republic of Ireland)	Dylan Gavin	(Republic of Ireland) Athlone Town	Released	
1 July 2023	CM	(England)	Alex Gilbey	(England) Milton Keynes Dons	Released	
1 July 2023	GK	(England)	Nathan Harness	(England) Milton Keynes Dons	Released	
1 July 2023	GK	(England)	Nathan Harvey	(England) Gillingham	Released	
1 July 2023	CB	(England)	Ryan Inniss	(England) Forest Green Rovers	Released	
1 July 2023	CM	(England)	Albie Morgan	(England) Blackpool	Released	
1 July 2023	DF	(Scotland)	Harris O’Connor	(United States) Missouri State Bears	Released	
1 July 2023	DF	(Republic of Ireland)	Sam Oguntayo	(England) Hanwell Town	Released	
1 July 2023	FW	(England)	Mack Reilly	(England) Chatham Town	Released	
1 July 2023	GK	(Ghana)	Joe Wollacott	(Scotland) Hibernian	Undisclosed	
7 July 2023	CB	(Scotland)	Samuel Lavelle	(England) Carlisle United	Undisclosed	
11 July 2023	GK	(Ivory Coast)	Ahmed Kone	(Qatar) Al-Khor	Undisclosed	
15 August 2023	RB	(England)	Mandela Egbo	(England) Colchester United	Undisclosed	
4 September 2023	MF	(England)	Sahid Kamara	(England) Birmingham City	Free transfer	
20 December 2023	LW	(England)	Charlie Kirk	(England) Crewe Alexandra	Released	
11 January 2024	GK	(England)	Sam Walker	(England) Bradford City	Free transfer	
2 February 2024	CB	(England)	Deji Elerewe	(England) Bromley	Undisclosed	

=== Loans in ===
Date from	Position	Nationality	Name	From	Date until	Ref.
18 July 2023	MF	(Guinea-Bissau)	Panutche Camará	(England) Ipswich Town	End of season	
23 August 2023	FW	(Wales)	Chem Campbell	(England) Wolverhampton Wanderers	15 January 2024	
1 September 2023	MF	(Republic of Ireland)	Louie Watson	(England) Luton Town	End of season	
1 September 2023	RB	(Republic of Ireland)	James Abankwah	(Italy) Udinese	29 January 2024	
1 September 2023	FW	(Serbia)	Slobodan Tedić	(England) Manchester City	5 January 2024	
5 January 2024	MF	(England)	Tyreeq Bakinson	(England) Sheffield Wednesday	End of season	
5 January 2024	MF	(Scotland)	Lewis Fiorini	(England) Manchester City	End of season	
19 January 2024	FW	(England)	Freddie Ladapo	(England) Ipswich Town	End of season	

=== Loans out ===
Date from	Position	Nationality	Name	To	Date until	Ref.
4 August 2023	MF	(England)	Aaron Henry	(England) Crawley Town	5 January 2024	
25 August 2023	DF	(England)	Oliver Hobden	(England) Chatham Town	24 October 2023	
30 August 2023	AM	(England)	Jack Payne	(England) Milton Keynes Dons	End of season	
1 September 2023	CB	(England)	Zach Mitchell	(England) Colchester United	End of season	
1 September 2023	RW	(England)	Diallang Jaiyesimi	(Scotland) St Johnstone	End of season	
15 September 2023	MF	(Ecuador)	Jeremy Santos	(England) Tonbridge Angels	14 October 2023	
29 September 2023	DF	(Australia)	Matt Dench	(England) Billericay Town	25 November 2023	
6 October 2023	FW	(Sierra Leone)	Daniel Kanu	(England) Southend United	2 December 2023	
12 October 2023	LB	(England)	Jacob Roddy	(England) Weston-super-Mare	11 November 2023	
13 October 2023	CB	(England)	Deji Elerewe	(England) Bromley	9 December 2023	
24 November 2023	DF	(England)	Richard Chin	(England) Dartford	31 December 2023	
15 December 2023	FW	(England)	Tolu Ladapo	(England) Hungerford Town	14 January 2024	
23 December 2023	LB	(England)	Jacob Roddy	(England) Oxford City	End of season	
1 January 2024	DF	(Czech Republic)	Seydil Toure	(England) Oxford City	31 January 2024	
5 January 2024	MF	(England)	Aaron Henry	(England) Wealdstone	End of season	
22 January 2024	MF	(England)	Harvey Kedwell	(England) Dagenham & Redbridge	End of season	
22 January 2024	LW	(England)	Corey Blackett-Taylor	(England) Derby County	End of season	
31 January 2024	MF	(Scotland)	Scott Fraser	(Scotland) Heart of Midlothian	End of season	
1 February 2024	MF	(Scotland)	Conor McGrandles	(England) Lincoln City	End of season	
3 February 2024	MF	(England)	Jason Adigun	(England) Welling United	End of season	
9 February 2024	DF	(England)	Nazir Bakrin	(England) Weymouth	8 March 2024	
10 February 2024	DF	(England)	Richard Chin	(England) Bath City	End of season	

== Friendlies ==
On Thursday 13 April 2023, Charlton announced their first pre-season friendly against Welling United. On Thursday 27 April 2023, Charlton announced their second pre-season friendly against Dartford On Wednesday 17 May 2023, Charlton announced their third pre-season friendly against Leyton Orient that would take place during their summer training camp in Spain On Wednesday 31 May 2023, Charlton announced a fourth pre-season friendly against Scottish side Aberdeen at The Valley. On Tuesday 6 June 2023, a fifth fixture was added, against Gillingham. On Monday 19 June 2023, a sixth friendly was announced against Millwall. On 5 July 2023, a seventh friendly was announced at Wealdstone.

1 July 2023 Friendly	Welling United	0–4	Charlton Athletic	Welling
15:10 BST		Report	Lavelle 11'; Anderson 35'; Mitchell 45'; Kirk 56'	Stadium: Park View Road; Attendance: 2,765; Referee: Isaac Searle

8 July 2023 Friendly	Dartford	1–2	Charlton Athletic	Dartford
15:00 BST	Manor 66'	Report	Asiimwe 57', 60'	Stadium: Princes Park; Attendance: 2,800; Referee: George Warren

14 July 2023 Friendly	Charlton Athletic	1–1	Leyton Orient	Málaga, Spain
10:00 BST(120 minute game)	May 29'	Report	Drinan 58'	Stadium: Banús Football Center

18 July 2023 Friendly	Gillingham	1–3	Charlton Athletic	Gillingham
19:30 BST	Wright 32'	Report	T. Campbell 1'; Blackett-Taylor 54'; Payne 56'	Stadium: MEMS Priestfield Stadium; Attendance: 2,932; Referee: Gavin Ward

22 July 2023 Friendly	Wealdstone	0–5	Charlton Athletic	Ruislip
15:00 BST		Report	Jones 19'; Camará 21'; Fraser 27'; May 77'; Anderson 87'	Stadium: Grosvenor Vale; Referee: Sam Mulhull

25 July 2023 Friendly	Millwall	2–2	Charlton Athletic	Bermondsey
19:45 BST	Nisbet 69'; Emakhu 83'	Report	Anderson 6'; Kirk 25'	Stadium: The Den; Attendance: 7,143; Referee: Keith Stroud

29 July 2023 Friendly	Charlton Athletic	2–3	Aberdeen	Charlton
13:00 BST	Blackett-Taylor 69'; Kanu 89'	Report	Asiimwe 3' (o.g.); Shinnie 22'; Miovski 33'	Stadium: The Valley; Attendance: 5,174; Referee: Gavin Ward

== Competitions ==
=== League One ===
==== League table ====
Pos	Team	Pld	W	D	L	GF	GA	GD	Pts
13	Exeter City	46	17	10	19	46	61	−15	61
14	Northampton Town	46	17	9	20	57	66	−9	60
15	Bristol Rovers	46	16	9	21	52	68	−16	57
16	Charlton Athletic	46	11	20	15	64	65	−1	53
17	Reading	46	16	11	19	68	70	−2	53 (Note: On 16 August 2023, Reading were deducted one point for failing to pay players on time and in full on three occasions in the 2022–23 season. Another 3-point deduction was applied on 13 September, for failing to deposit wages on time. Another 2-point deduction was applied on 27 February, due to late HMRC payments.)
18	Cambridge United	46	12	12	22	39	61	−22	48
19	Shrewsbury Town	46	13	9	24	35	67	−32	48

Source: EFL Official Website
Rules for classification: 1) Points; 2) Goal difference; 3) Number of goals scored; 4) Head-to-head results; 5) Wins; 6) Away goals; 7) Penalty points (sec 9.5); 8) 12-point sending off offences

==== Result summary ====
Overall								Home						Away					
Pld	W	D	L	GF	GA	GD	Pts	W	D	L	GF	GA	GD	W	D	L	GF	GA	GD
46	11	20	15	64	65	−1	53	8	8	7	37	31	+6	3	12	8	27	34	−7

Last updated: 27 April 2024.

==== Results by round ====
Round	1	2	3	4	5	6	7	8	9	10	11	12	13	14	15	16	17	18	19	20	21	22	23	24	25	26	27	28	29	30	31	32	33	34	35	36	37	38	39	40	41	42	43	44	45	46
Ground	H	A	H	H	A	H	A	H	A	H	H	H	A	H	A	A	A	H	H	A	H	A	A	H	A	H	A	H	A	H	A	H	A	H	A	A	A	H	A	A	H	H	H	A	H	A
Result	W	L	L	L	L	W	D	W	D	W	D	W	L	L	W	D	D	W	D	D	D	L	L	L	D	L	L	L	D	L	L	D	D	D	W	D	W	W	D	D	D	W	D	D	D	L
Position	8	11	15	18	19	16	17	16	15	14	12	10	13	15	11	11	10	10	10	10	11	12	12	14	13	13	16	16	18	19	20	20	20	20	19	18	14	14	16	16	16	16	14	16	16	16

Updated to match(es) played on 27 April 2024. Source:
A = Away; H = Home; W = Win; D = Draw; L = Loss; P = postponed

==== Matches ====
The 2023–24 season fixtures were released on Thursday 22 June 2023.

5 August 2023 1	Charlton Athletic	1–0	Leyton Orient	Charlton
15:00 BST	Dobson 45'	Report		Stadium: The Valley; Attendance: 18,512; Referee: Andrew Kitchen

12 August 2023 2	Peterborough United	1–0	Charlton Athletic	Peterborough
15:00 BST	Kyprianou 45+1'	Report		Stadium: Weston Homes Stadium; Attendance: 9,100; Referee: Lee Swabey

15 August 2023 3	Charlton Athletic	1–2	Bristol Rovers	Charlton
19:45 BST	Kanu 73'	Report	Sinclair 58'; McCormick 90+8'	Stadium: The Valley; Attendance: 12,756; Referee: Charles Breakspear

19 August 2023 4	Charlton Athletic	2–3	Port Vale	Charlton
15:00 BST	May 10' (pen.); Kanu 71'	Report	Wilson 55'; Chislett 56'; Ojo 87'	Stadium: The Valley; Attendance: 11,912; Referee: Sunny Singh Gill

26 August 2023 5	Oxford United	2–1	Charlton Athletic	Oxford
15:00 BST	Goodrham 10', 85'	Report	May 63'	Stadium: Kassam Stadium; Attendance: 8,898; Referee: Adam Herczeg

2 September 2023 6	Charlton Athletic	2–1	Fleetwood Town	Charlton
15:00 BST	May 43', 73' (pen.)	Report	Stockley 16'	Stadium: The Valley; Attendance: 11,309; Referee: Carl Brook

16 September 2023 7	Stevenage	1–1	Charlton Athletic	Stevenage
15:00 BST	Reid 34'	Report	Blackett-Taylor 90+2' (pen.)	Stadium: Lamex Stadium; Attendance: 5,119; Referee: Peter Wright

23 September 2023 8	Charlton Athletic	3–1	Wycombe Wanderers	Charlton
15:00 BST	Leaburn 27'; Tedić 82'; Blackett-Taylor 90+4'	Report	Potts 54'	Stadium: The Valley; Attendance: 12,556; Referee: Ben Toner

30 September 2023 9	Shrewsbury Town	0–0	Charlton Athletic	Shrewsbury
15:00 BST		Report		Stadium: The Croud Meadow; Attendance: 5,619; Referee: Edward Duckworth

3 October 2023 10	Charlton Athletic	4–1	Exeter City	Charlton
19:45 BST	Blackett-Taylor 45'; May 65', 86'; Leaburn 79'	Report	Scott 23'	Stadium: The Valley; Attendance: 11,575; Referee: David Rock

7 October 2023 11	Charlton Athletic	2–2	Blackpool	Charlton
15:00 BST	May 81'; Blackett-Taylor 83'	Report	Rhodes 34'; Dembélé 70'	Stadium: The Valley; Attendance: 13,120; Referee: Andy Davies

21 October 2023 12	Charlton Athletic	4–0	Reading	Charlton
15:00 BST	Aneke 54'; T. Campbell 68'; May 74'; Leaburn 90+4'	Report		Stadium: The Valley; Attendance: 15,572; Referee: Scott Oldham

24 October 2023 13	Lincoln City	3–1	Charlton Athletic	Lincoln
19:45 BST	Adelakun 33', 57'; Roughan 78'	Report	May 10'	Stadium: LNER Stadium; Attendance: 7,314; Referee: Daniel Middleton

28 October 2023 14	Charlton Athletic	0–2	Bolton Wanderers	Charlton
15:00 BST		Report	Williams 16'; Charles 21'	Stadium: The Valley; Attendance: 14,343; Referee: Geoff Eltringham

31 October 2023 15	Wigan Athletic	2–3	Charlton Athletic	Wigan
19:45 GMT	Aasgaard 84'; Humphrys 90'	Report	May 21', 31'; Blackett-Taylor 43'	Stadium: DW Stadium; Attendance: 8,486; Referee: Paul Howard

11 November 2023 16	Portsmouth	2–2	Charlton Athletic	Portsmouth
15:00 GMT	Kamara 31'; Bishop 75' (pen.)	Report	May 71'; McGrandles 90+3'	Stadium: Fratton Park; Attendance: 19,404; Referee: Sam Allison

25 November 2023 17	Carlisle United	1–1	Charlton Athletic	Carlisle
15:00 GMT	Lavelle 62'	Report	Blackett-Taylor 54'	Stadium: Brunton Park; Attendance: 10,477; Referee: Leigh Doughty

28 November 2023 18	Charlton Athletic	2–1	Cheltenham Town	Charlton
19:45 GMT	May 17' (pen.), 86' (pen.)	Report	Goodwin 10'	Stadium: The Valley; Attendance: 10,622; Referee: Gavin Ward

9 December 2023 19	Charlton Athletic	2–2	Cambridge United	Charlton
15:00 GMT	May 52'; C. Campbell 61'	Report	Ahadme 87', 90+6' (pen.)	Stadium: The Valley; Attendance: 13,373; Referee: Thomas Kirk

16 December 2023 20	Barnsley	1–1	Charlton Athletic	Barnsley
15:00 GMT	Phillips 24'	Report	Blackett-Taylor 70'	Stadium: Oakwell; Attendance: 11,716; Referee: Simon Mather

23 December 2023 21	Charlton Athletic	1–1	Burton Albion	Charlton
15:00 GMT	Jones 19'	Report	Sweeney 90+1'	Stadium: The Valley; Attendance: 12,210; Referee: Lee Swabey

26 December 2023 22	Leyton Orient	1–0	Charlton Athletic	Leyton
13:00 GMT	Beckles 80'	Report		Stadium: Gaughan Group Stadium; Attendance: 8,499; Referee: Daniel Middleton

29 December 2023 23	Bristol Rovers	2–1	Charlton Athletic	Bristol
19:45 GMT	Martin 68', 90+4'	Report	Tedić 85'	Stadium: Memorial Stadium; Attendance: 9,143; Referee: Neil Hair

1 January 2024 24	Charlton Athletic	1–2	Oxford United	Charlton
15:00 GMT	C. Campbell 5'	Report	Harris 22'; Smyth 85'	Stadium: The Valley; Attendance: 13,955; Referee: Alex Chilowicz

6 January 2024 25	Port Vale	3–3	Charlton Athletic	Burslem
15:00 GMT	Chislett 45' (pen.); Ikpeazu 63'; Massey 90+2'	Report	Blackett-Taylor 27'; Kanu 59'; T. Campbell 83'	Stadium: Vale Park; Attendance: 5,993; Referee: Martin Coy

13 January 2024 26	Charlton Athletic	1–2	Peterborough United	Charlton
15:00 GMT	May 49'	Report	Mason-Clark 28', 75'	Stadium: The Valley; Attendance: 13,309; Referee: Sam Purkiss

20 January 2024 27	Burton Albion	2–0	Charlton Athletic	Burton upon Trent
15:00 GMT	Helm 24'; Brayford 47'	Report		Stadium: Pirelli Stadium; Attendance: 3,070; Referee: Alan Young

23 January 2024 28	Charlton Athletic	2–3	Northampton Town	Charlton
19:45 GMT	McGowan 20' (o.g.); T. Watson 45+3'	Report	Simpson 7'; Hoskins 22'; Appéré 90+7'	Stadium: The Valley; Attendance: 10,943; Referee: Paul Howard

27 January 2024 29	Blackpool	1–1	Charlton Athletic	Blackpool
15:00 GMT	Dembélé 53'	Report	Ekpiteta 69' (o.g.)	Stadium: Bloomfield Road; Attendance: 10,059; Referee: Darren Drysdale

3 February 2024 30	Charlton Athletic	0–1	Derby County	Charlton
15:00 GMT		Report	Mendez-Laing 31'	Stadium: The Valley; Attendance: 16,014; Referee: Ed Duckworth

10 February 2024 31	Reading	2–0	Charlton Athletic	Reading
15:00 GMT	Azeez 66', 76'	Report		Stadium: Select Car Leasing Stadium; Attendance: 14,554; Referee: Craig Hicks

13 February 2024 32	Charlton Athletic	1–1	Lincoln City	Charlton
19:45 GMT	Ladapo 73'	Report	Hackett-Fairchild 37'	Stadium: The Valley; Attendance: 12,713; Referee: David Rock

17 February 2024 33	Bolton Wanderers	3–3	Charlton Athletic	Horwich
15:00 GMT	Adeboyejo 19'; Maghoma 51'; Böðvarsson 71'	Report	Small 22'; Jones 40'; Kanu 61'	Stadium: University of Bolton Stadium; Attendance: 20,179; Referee: Ross Joyce

24 February 2024 34	Charlton Athletic	0–0	Portsmouth	Charlton
15:00 GMT		Report		Stadium: The Valley; Attendance: 16,732; Referee: Robert Madley

27 February 2024 35	Derby County	1–2	Charlton Athletic	Derby
19:45 GMT	Cashin 39'	Report	May 65' (pen.); Anderson 80'	Stadium: Pride Park Stadium; Attendance: 24,557; Referee: Jeremy Simpson

2 March 2024 36	Northampton Town	1–1	Charlton Athletic	Northampton
15:00 GMT	Appéré 80'	Report	Anderson 4'	Stadium: Sixfields Stadium; Attendance: 7,710; Referee: Martin Woods

5 March 2024 37	Cheltenham Town	1–3	Charlton Athletic	Cheltenham
19:45 GMT	Sercombe 70'	Report	Kanu 19'; Bakinson 86'; May 90'	Stadium: Completely-Suzuki Stadium; Attendance: 4,392; Referee: Scott Jackson

9 March 2024 38	Charlton Athletic	3–2	Carlisle United	Charlton
15:00 GMT	May 37', 75'; Kanu 54'	Report	Armstrong 20'; Charters 63' (pen.)	Stadium: The Valley; Attendance: 13,978; Referee: Tom Nield

16 March 2024 39	Fleetwood Town	1–1	Charlton Athletic	Fleetwood
15:00 GMT	Graydon 84'	Report	May 45+1' (pen.)	Stadium: Highbury Stadium; Attendance: 3,401; Referee: Tom Reeves

29 March 2024 40	Exeter City	1–1	Charlton Athletic	Exeter
15:00 GMT	Purrington 6'	Report	Diabate 87' (o.g.)	Stadium: St James Park; Attendance: 8,088; Referee: Declan Bourne

1 April 2024 41	Charlton Athletic	0–0	Stevenage	Charlton
15:00 BST		Report		Stadium: The Valley; Attendance: 14,351; Referee: Scott Oldham

6 April 2024 42	Charlton Athletic	2–1	Barnsley	Charlton
15:00 BST	May 20', 40'	Report	Phillips 28' (pen.)	Stadium: The Valley; Attendance: 13,844; Referee: Benjamin Speedie

9 April 2024 43	Charlton Athletic	2–2	Wigan Athletic	Charlton
19:45 BST	Hughes 19' (o.g.); Aneke 79'	Report	Kelman 62', 66'	Stadium: The Valley; Attendance: 11,169; Referee: Lee Swabey

13 April 2024 44	Cambridge United	1–1	Charlton Athletic	Cambridge
15:00 BST	Bonne 50'	Report	Wickham 23'	Stadium: Abbey Stadium; Attendance: 7,484; Referee: Darren Drysdale

20 April 2024 45	Charlton Athletic	1–1	Shrewsbury Town	Charlton
15:00 BST	Dobson 46'	Report	Udoh 23'	Stadium: The Valley; Attendance: 15,187; Referee: Daniel Middleton

27 April 2024 46	Wycombe Wanderers	1–0	Charlton Athletic	High Wycombe
12:30 BST	Leahy 7' (pen.)	Report		Stadium: Adams Park; Attendance: 6,702; Referee: Elliot Bell

=== FA Cup ===
The first round draw was made on Sunday 15 October 2023. On Friday 20 October 2023, the club confirmed the date of their first round fixture. The second round draw was made on Sunday 5 November 2023. On Monday 6 November 2023, the date of the first round replay was announced. On Wednesday 8 November 2023, it was confirmed the first round replay would be shown live on BBC Two and that the date for the fixture would be amended to allow for television coverage.

5 November 2023 First round	Charlton Athletic	1–1	Cray Valley Paper Mills	Charlton
17:30 GMT	Fraser 9'	Report	Ness 48' (o.g.)	Stadium: The Valley; Attendance: 6,721; Referee: Benjamin Speedie
Note: Live on BBC Two

15 November 2023 First round replay	Cray Valley Paper Mills	1–6	Charlton Athletic	Eltham
19:45 GMT	Lisbie 44' (pen.)	Report	May 35', 51'; Leaburn 49'; Dobson 58'; T. Campbell 77'; Mbick 85'	Stadium: The Artic Stadium; Attendance: 1,550; Referee: Charles Breakspear
Note: Live on BBC Two

2 December 2023 Second round	Gillingham	2–0	Charlton Athletic	Gillingham
15:00 GMT	Bonne 26'; Dieng 30'	Report		Stadium: MEMS Priestfield Stadium; Attendance: 7,717; Referee: Sunny Singh Gill

=== EFL Cup ===
The first round draw was made on Thursday 22 June 2023.

8 August 2023 First round	Newport County	3–1	Charlton Athletic	Newport
19:30 BST	Wildig 63'; Evans 76'; Palmer-Houlden 81'	Report	Kanu 43'	Stadium: Rodney Parade; Attendance: 2,600; Referee: Scott Simpson

=== EFL Trophy ===
The regional group stage draw was confirmed on Wednesday 21 June 2023 and saw Charlton Athletic placed in Southern Group B, alongside Sutton United and Crawley Town. On Thursday 22 June 2023, it was confirmed that the final team in the group would be Aston Villa U21. On Monday 10 July 2023, the dates for the group stage fixtures were confirmed. On Friday 24 November 2023, the second round draw was made. On Monday 27 November 2023, the date for the second round tie was announced.

Pos	Div	Team	Pld	W	PW	PL	L	GF	GA	GD	Pts	Qualification
1	L2	Crawley Town	3	2	0	1	0	7	5	+2	7	Advance to Round 2
2	L1	Charlton Athletic	3	2	0	0	1	10	6	+4	6	Advance to Round 2
3	L2	Sutton United	3	0	1	1	1	2	5	−3	3	
4	ACA	Aston Villa U21	3	0	1	0	2	6	9	−3	2	

Updated to match(es) played on 21 November 2023. Source: EFL.com

5 September 2023 Group stage 1	Crawley Town	4–3	Charlton Athletic	Crawley
19:45 BST	Forster 1'; Lolos 45+4'; Tsaroulla 70'; Khaleel 81'	Report	Leaburn 23'; T. Campbell 26'; Dobson 58'	Stadium: Broadfield Stadium; Attendance: 1,973; Referee: Aji Ajibola

10 October 2023 Group stage 2	Charlton Athletic	4–2	Aston Villa U21	Charlton
19:00 BST	Kirk 4'; Leaburn 29' (pen.), 45+2'; L. Watson 40'	Report	Moore 73'; Alcock 81'	Stadium: The Valley; Attendance: 1,273; Referee: Neil Hair

21 November 2023 Group stage 3	Charlton Athletic	3–0	Sutton United	Charlton
19:00 GMT	Blackett-Taylor 11'; McGrandles 50'; May 68'	Report		Stadium: The Valley; Attendance: 1,377; Referee: Carl Brook

6 December 2023 Second round	Reading	1–1 (4–2 p)	Charlton Athletic	Reading
19:00 GMT	Savage 82'	Report	May 42'	Stadium: Select Car Leasing Stadium; Attendance: 1,809; Referee: Peter Wright
	Penalties
	Knibbs (penalty scored); Carson (penalty scored); Azeez (penalty scored); Vickers (penalty scored)		May (penalty missed); Fraser (penalty scored); Hector (penalty scored); L. Watson (penalty missed)

=== London Senior Cup ===
15 November 2023 First round	Cockfosters	2–3	Charlton Athletic	Cockfosters
19:45 GMT	Griffin 4'; Lutaaya 88'	Report	Casey 59', 67'; Roddy 80'	Stadium: Chalk Lane; Attendance: 225; Referee: Bruno Marques

7 February 2024 Second round	Welling United	1–2	Charlton Athletic	Welling
19:45 GMT	Johnson 32'	Report	Casey 79', 81'	Stadium: Park View Road; Referee: Deryll David

5 March 2024 Quarter-finals	Charlton Athletic	4–3	Barking	Dartford
19:30 GMT	Mbick 16', 62'; Casey 24', 38'	Report	Martin 51'; Kayembe 64'; Forrest 68'	Stadium: Princes Park; Referee: Maros Valko

25 April 2024 Semi-finals	Metropolitan Police	1–2	Charlton Athletic	East Molesey
19:45 BST	Edwin 90+5'	Report	Toure 5'; Enslin 45'	Stadium: Imber Court; Referee: Oliver Storey

29 April 2024 Final	Hendon	1–2	Charlton Athletic	East Dulwich
19:45 BST	Apat 90'	Report	Casey 5', 39'	Stadium: Champion Hill; Attendance: 229; Referee: Morgan Conn
