= Ashley Maynard-Brewer =

Australian soccer player (born 1999)

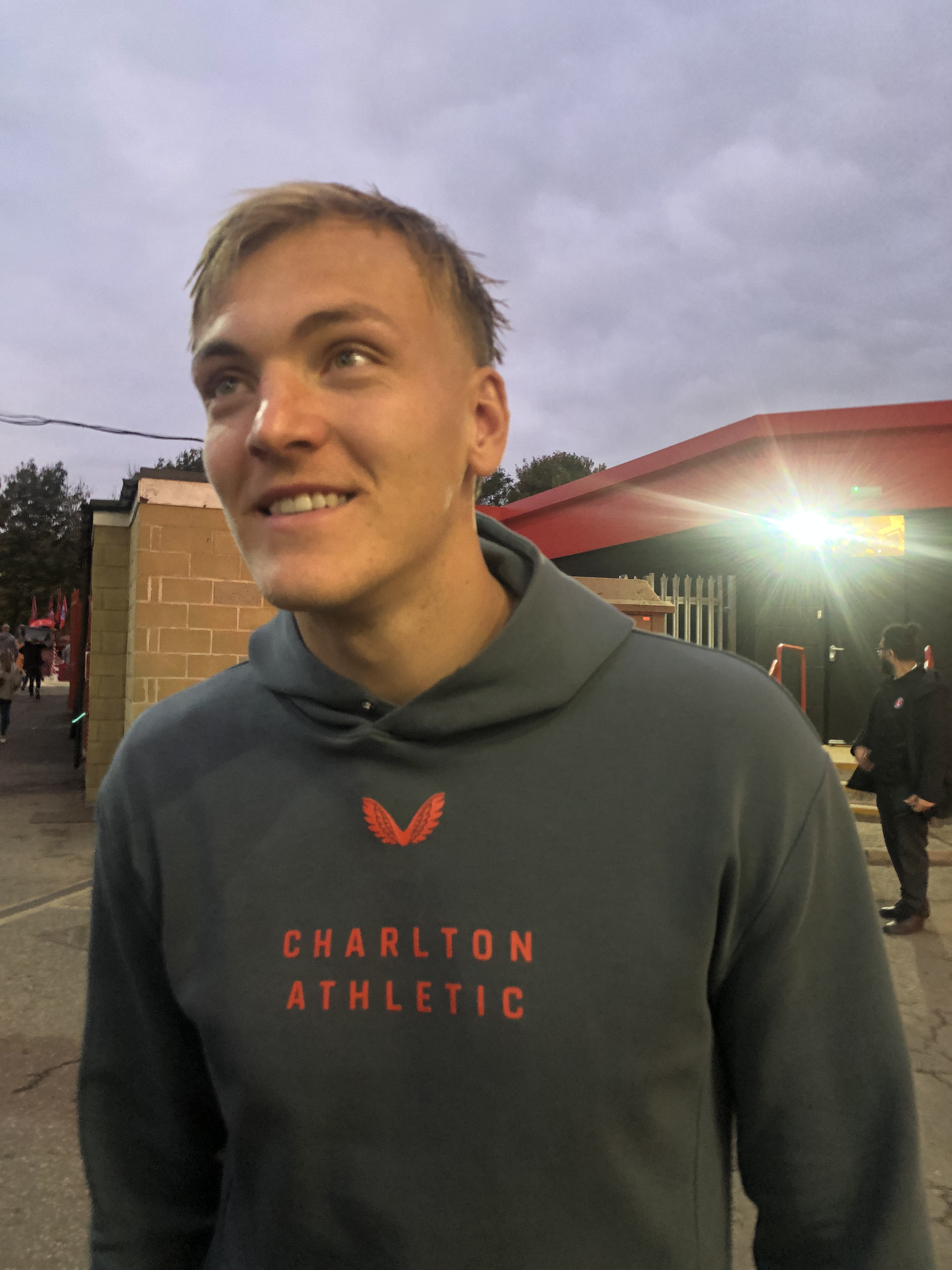
- Maynard-Brewer in 2024

Personal information
- Full name: Ashley Maynard-Brewer
- Date of birth: 25 June 1999 (age 27)
- Place of birth: Dunstable, England
- Height: 1.87 m (6 ft 2 in)
- Position: Goalkeeper

Team information
- Current team: Sheffield Wednesday
- Number: 13

Youth career
- –2015: ECU Joondalup
- 2015–2018: Charlton Athletic

Senior career*
Years	Team	Apps	(Gls)
2018–2026	Charlton Athletic	70	(0)
2018	→ Chelmsford City (loan)	6	(0)
2019	→ Hampton & Richmond Borough (loan)	6	(0)
2019	→ Dulwich Hamlet (loan)	12	(0)
2020	→ Dover Athletic (loan)	4	(0)
2021–2022	→ Ross County (loan)	17	(0)
2022	→ Gillingham (loan)	0	(0)
2026	Dundee United	10	(0)
2026–	Sheffield Wednesday	5	(0)
2026	→ Gillingham (loan)	2	(0)

International career^{‡}
2021	Australia U23	3	(0)
- * Club domestic league appearances and goals as of 19:56, 8 November 2026 (UTC) ‡ National team caps and goals as of 15:10, 11 September 2025 (UTC)

Ashley Maynard-Brewer (born 25 June 1999) is a professional footballer who plays for EFL League One club Sheffield Wednesday. Born in England, he has played for the Australia under-23 national team and has been called up for the Australia senior national team.

== Career ==
=== Charlton Athletic ===
Maynard-Brewer began his career in the academy at Australian club ECU Joondalup, before signing for Charlton Athletic in 2015, where he was contracted until the end of the 2022–23 season. On 13 November 2018, Maynard-Brewer made his debut for Charlton in a 1–0 EFL Trophy loss against Swansea City U21s.

==== Loans ====
Maynard-Brewer has been loaned out six times by Charlton. He signed for Chelmsford City on loan in November 2018, and the following March joined Hampton & Richmond Borough on loan until the end of the 2018–19 season.

On 5 August 2019, Maynard-Brewer joined Dulwich Hamlet on a 28-day emergency loan, and the following January he joined Dover Athletic.

Maynard-Brewer joined Ross County on a season-long loan in August 2021. Ahead of their 2022–23 season, Maynard-Brewer joined recently-relegated League Two club Gillingham on another season-long loan, with Charlton holding the option to recall him. In July 2022, he suffered a dislocated shoulder in a pre-season friendly against his former side Dover Athletic, keeping him out of action for several months. He returned to action for Charlton's U21s side in a 2–0 loss to Bristol City's U21s on 1 November 2022. Maynard-Brewer was recalled from his loan on 17 November 2022 without making a competitive first-team appearance for Gillingham.

=== Dundee United ===
On 28 January 2026, Maynard-Brewer joined Dundee United on an initial six-month deal for an undisclosed fee.

=== Sheffield Wednesday ===
On 31 July 2026, Maynard Brewer joined EFL League One club Sheffield Wednesday on a one-year contract. He made his debut in the EFL Trophy against Salford City starting the game. Following an injury to regular number one Joe Lumley, he would make his league debut in October against AFC Wimbledon.

==== Gillingham (loan) ====
On the opening day of the league season, he signed a one-week emergency loan at former club Gillingham, making his debut that day in a 3–0 defeat to Walsall. His loan was extended by a further week meaning he was eligible for their game against Fleetwood Town.

== International career ==
Maynard-Brewer was part of the Olyroos Olympic squad at the Tokyo 2020 Olympics, but did not make an appearance. He made three appearances for the side in the lead-up to the tournament.

In September 2023, Maynard-Brewer was called-up for the first time to the Australia senior national team ahead of a friendly match against Mexico.

== Career statistics ==
As of 8 November 2026

Appearances and goals by club, season and competition
Club	Season	League			National Cup (Note: Includes FA Cup & Scottish Cup)		League Cup (Note: Includes EFL Cup & Scottish League Cup)		Other		Total	
Club	Season	Division	Apps	Goals	Apps	Goals	Apps	Goals	Apps	Goals	Apps	Goals
Charlton Athletic	2018–19	EFL League One	0	0	0	0	0	0	1 (Note: Appearance(s) in EFL Trophy)	0	1	0
Charlton Athletic	2019–20	EFL Championship	0	0	0	0	0	0	—		0	0
Charlton Athletic	2020–21	EFL League One	0	0	1	0	0	0	3	0	4	0
Charlton Athletic	2021–22	EFL League One	0	0	0	0	0	0	0	0	0	0
Charlton Athletic	2022–23	EFL League One	26	0	1	0	2	0	0	0	29	0
Charlton Athletic	2023–24	EFL League One	25	0	1	0	0	0	2	0	28	0
Charlton Athletic	2024–25	EFL League One	19	0	1	0	0	0	4	0	24	0
Charlton Athletic	2025–26	EFL Championship	0	0	0	0	1	0	—		1	0
Charlton Athletic	Total		70	0	4	0	3	0	10	0	87	0
Chelmsford City (loan)	2018–19	National League South	6	0	0	0	0	0	1 (Note: Appearance(s) in Essex Senior Cup)	0	7	0
Hampton & Richmond Borough (loan)	2018–19	National League South	6	0	0	0	0	0	0	0	6	0
Dulwich Hamlet (loan)	2019–20	National League South	12	0	1	0	0	0	0	0	13	0
Dover Athletic (loan)	2019–20	National League	4	0	0	0	0	0	0	0	4	0
Ross County (loan)	2021–22	Scottish Premiership	17	0	0	0	0	0	—		17	0
Gillingham (loan)	2022–23	EFL League Two	0	0	0	0	0	0	0	0	0	0
Dundee United	2025–26	Scottish Premiership	10	0	2	0	0	0	—		12	0
Sheffield Wednesday	2026–27	EFL League One	5	0	1	0	0	0	1	0	7	0
Gillingham (loan)	2026–27	EFL League Two	2	0	0	0	—		—		2	0
Career total			132	0	8	0	3	0	12	0	155	0

== Honours ==
Charlton Athletic

- EFL League One play-offs: 2025
