= Patrick Casey (footballer) =

Irish footballer (born 2005)

Personal information
- Full name: Patrick Joseph Casey
- Date of birth: 19 December 2005 (age 20)
- Place of birth: Hackney, England
- Position: Forward

Youth career
- 2014–2024: Charlton Athletic

Senior career*
Years	Team	Apps	(Gls)
2024–2026	Charlton Athletic	1	(0)
2025	→ Maidstone United (loan)	2	(0)
2025–2026	→ Dorking Wanderers (loan)	9	(7)
- * Club domestic league appearances and goals as of 22:10, 29 June 2026 (UTC)

Patrick Joseph Casey (born 19 December 2005) is an Irish professional footballer who plays as a forward. He is currently a free agent.

== Career ==
=== Charlton Athletic ===
Casey joined Charlton Athletic at the under-nine age group, and turned professional at the club in June 2023 when he signed a three-year contract, having scored 42 goals in one season for the under-18 and under-21 teams and also having received a call up to the Republic of Ireland U19 squad.

He made his League One debut on 1 January 2024, coming on as an 88th-minute substitute for Daniel Kanu in a 2–1 defeat to Oxford United at The Valley.

On 12 May 2026, with his deal running out at the end of June 2026, Charlton announced that they had offered Casey a new contract.

==== Maidstone United (loan) ====
On 23 August 2025, Casey joined National League South side Maidstone United on an initial 28-day loan, where he made three appearances in all competitions without scoring.

==== Dorking Wanderers (loan) ====
On 10 December 2025, Casey returned to the National League South to join Dorking Wanderers on loan for the remainder of the campaign.

Casey went on to score his first senior goal in his first game for the club, netting the opener in a FA Trophy clash with Bath City on 13 December 2025. He then netted his first league goals for the Wanderers on Boxing Day, where he scored a brace in a 2–0 win over local rivals Horsham.

== Career statistics ==
As of match played 10 February 2026

Appearances and goals by club, season and competition
Club	Season	League			FA Cup		EFL Cup		Other		Total	
Club	Season	Division	Apps	Goals	Apps	Goals	Apps	Goals	Apps	Goals	Apps	Goals
Charlton Athletic	2023–24	League One	1	0	0	0	0	0	0	0	1	0
Charlton Athletic	2024–25	League One	0	0	0	0	0	0	0	0	0	0
Charlton Athletic	2025–26	Championship	0	0	0	0	0	0	—		0	0
Charlton Athletic	Charlton Athletic total		1	0	0	0	0	0	0	0	1	0
Maidstone United (loan)	2025–26	National League South	2	0	1	0	—		0	0	3	0
Dorking Wanderers (loan)	2025–26	National League South	9	7	—		—		1 (Note: Appearance(s) in FA Trophy)	1	10	8
Career total			12	7	1	0	0	0	1	1	14	8
