= Henry Rylah =

English footballer (born 2005)

Personal information
- Full name: Henry Alan Zachariah Rylah
- Date of birth: 18 November 2005 (age 20)
- Place of birth: Lewisham, England
- Position: Midfielder

Team information
- Current team: Solihull Moors (on loan from Charlton Athletic)
- Number: 14

Youth career
- 2019–2022: Charlton Athletic

Senior career*
Years	Team	Apps	(Gls)
2022–	Charlton Athletic	3	(0)
2026	→ Derry City (loan)	14	(2)
2026–	→ Solihull Moors (loan)	1	(0)
- * Club domestic league appearances and goals as of 17:10, 19 October 2026 (UTC)

Henry Alan Zachariah Rylah (born 18 November 2005) is an English professional footballer who plays as a midfielder for Solihull Moors on loan from EFL Championship club Charlton Athletic.

== Career ==
=== Charlton Athletic ===
Coming through the youth system of Charlton Athletic, Rylah made his professional debut for the club as a 16–year–old, coming off the bench in the 81st minute of a 2–1 EFL Trophy victory at home against Brighton & Hove Albion U21 on 2 November 2022.

Rylah made his second appearance for the club on 22 November 2022, again coming off the bench, in a EFL Trophy Second Round 3–2 defeat away at Plymouth Argyle. On 5 May 2023, Rylah signed a new three-year professional contract with the club.

On 22 September 2025, Rylah signed a new contract with the club, extending his existing deal until the summer of 2027, with a club option of an additional year.

==== Derry City (loan) ====
On 29 January 2026, Rylah joined League of Ireland Premier Division club Derry City on loan until December 2026.

On 31 January 2026, Rylah made his debut for Derry City, coming on in the 88th minute of a 1–0 victory over Shamrock Rovers in the 2026 President of Ireland's Cup at Tallaght Stadium.

He scored the first goal of his senior career on 13 March 2026, in a 2–1 defeat at home to Shelbourne at the Ryan McBride Brandywell Stadium.

On 16 June 2026, Rylah was recalled from his loan by Charlton Athletic.

==== Solihull Moors (loan) ====
On 8 August 2026, Rylah joined National League club Solihull Moors on a two-month loan.

On 16 October 2026, it was confirmed that Rylah would return to the club on loan until January 2027.

== Career statistics ==
As of match played 8 August 2026

Appearances and goals by club, season and competition
Club	Season	League			National Cup		League Cup		Other		Total	
Club	Season	Division	Apps	Goals	Apps	Goals	Apps	Goals	Apps	Goals	Apps	Goals
Charlton Athletic	2022–23	League One	1	0	0	0	0	0	2 (Note: Appearances in the EFL Trophy)	0	3	0
Charlton Athletic	2023–24	League One	2	0	0	0	0	0	1	0	3	0
Charlton Athletic	2024–25	League One	0	0	0	0	0	0	2	0	2	0
Charlton Athletic	2025–26	Championship	0	0	0	0	2	0	—		2	0
Charlton Athletic	2026–27	Championship	0	0	0	0	0	0	—		0	0
Charlton Athletic	Total		3	0	0	0	2	0	5	0	10	0
Derry City (loan)	2026	LOI Premier Division	14	2	0	0	—		1 (Note: Appearance in the President of Ireland's Cup)	0	15	2
Solihull Moors (loan)	2026–27	National League	1	0	0	0	—		0	0	1	0
Career total			18	2	0	0	2	0	6	0	26	2

== Honours ==
Derry City

- President of Ireland's Cup: 2026
