= Harvey Kedwell =

English footballer (born 2004)

Personal information
- Full name: Harvey Daniel Kedwell
- Date of birth: 19 December 2004 (age 21)
- Place of birth: Medway, England
- Position: Midfielder

Team information
- Current team: Folkestone Invicta
- Number: 38

Youth career
- 2014–2025: Charlton Athletic

Senior career*
Years	Team	Apps	(Gls)
2023–2025	Charlton Athletic	0	(0)
2024	→ Dagenham & Redbridge (loan)	17	(0)
2025–2026	AFC Croydon Athletic	33	(4)
2026–	Folkestone Invicta	13	(1)
- * Club domestic league appearances and goals as of 17:10, 25 October 2026 (UTC)

Harvey Daniel Kedwell (born 19 December 2004) is an English professional footballer who plays as a midfielder for Folkestone Invicta.

== Career ==
=== Charlton Athletic ===
Kedwell came through the youth ranks at Charlton Athletic and signed his first professional contract with the club on 5 July 2023.

He made his debut for the club on 10 October 2023 in a 4–2 EFL Trophy victory over Aston Villa U21 coming on as an 73rd-minute substitute for Scott Fraser at The Valley.

On 27 May 2025, Kedwell announced on his Instagram page that he would be leaving the club upon the expiry of his contract.

==== Dagenham & Redbridge (loan) ====
On 22 January 2024, Kedwell joined Dagenham & Redbridge on loan for the rest of the 2023–24 season.

=== AFC Croydon Athletic ===
Following his release from Charlton Athletic, Kedwell joined AFC Croydon Athletic; managed by his father Danny Kedwell. On 2 August 2025, Kedwell scored on his debut for the club in the FA Cup Extra Preliminary Round in a 3–0 victory over Roffey.

=== Folkestone Invicta ===
On 29 May 2026, Kedwell joined Folkestone Invicta ahead of the 2026–27 season.

== Career statistics ==
As of match played 24 October 2026

Appearances and goals by club, season and competition
Club	Season	League			FA Cup		EFL Cup		Other		Total	
Club	Season	Division	Apps	Goals	Apps	Goals	Apps	Goals	Apps	Goals	Apps	Goals
Charlton Athletic	2023–24	League One	0	0	1	0	0	0	2 (Note: Two appearances in the EFL Trophy)	0	3	0
Charlton Athletic	2024–25	League One	0	0	0	0	0	0	0	0	0	0
Charlton Athletic	Charlton Athletic total		0	0	1	0	0	0	2	0	3	0
Dagenham & Redbridge (loan)	2023–24	National League	17	0	—		—		—		17	0
AFC Croydon Athletic	2025–26	Isthmian League South East Division	33	4	4	1	—		6 (Note: One appearance in the FA Trophy) (Note: One appearance in the Surrey Senior Cup) (Note: One appearance in the London Senior Cup) (Note: One appearance in the Velocity Cup) (Note: Two appearances in the Isthmian South East Division play-offs)	0	43	5
Folkestone Invicta	2026–27	National League South	13	1	1	0	—		0	0	14	1
Career total			63	5	6	1	0	0	8	0	77	6
