= Nathan Asiimwe =

Ugandan footballer (born 2004)

Personal information
- Full name: Nathan George Asiimwe
- Date of birth: 29 December 2004 (age 21)
- Place of birth: Kampala, Uganda
- Height: 1.82 m (6 ft 0 in)
- Positions: Right-back; right wing-back

Team information
- Current team: Salford City (on loan from Charlton Athletic)
- Number: 2

Youth career
- 2014–2023: Charlton Athletic

Senior career*
Years	Team	Apps	(Gls)
2022–	Charlton Athletic	19	(0)
2024	→ Hartlepool United (loan)	5	(0)
2025	→ Walsall (loan)	10	(0)
2025–2026	→ AFC Wimbledon (loan)	35	(1)
2026–	→ Salford City (loan)	7	(0)

International career^{‡}
2026–	Uganda	4	(0)
- * Club domestic league appearances and goals as of 17:10, 15 November 2026 (UTC) ‡ National team caps and goals as of 22:10, 17 November 2026 (UTC)

Nathan George Asiimwe is a Ugandan professional footballer who plays as a right-back or right wing-back for EFL League Two club Salford City on loan from EFL Championship club Charlton Athletic, and the Uganda national team.

== Club career ==
=== Charlton Athletic ===
Asiimwe joined Charlton Athletic's youth academy aged 9, having been scouted playing for Rockbourne Youth Club. He made his professional debut for the club as a 17–year–old, playing the full game in a 3–2 EFL Trophy second round defeat away at Plymouth Argyle on 22 November 2022.

On 7 May 2023, Asiimwe made his League One debut for Charlton Athletic, coming on in the 74th minute of the club's final game of the 2022–23 season during a 2–2 draw away at Cheltenham Town.

On 22 May 2023, Asiimwe signed his first professional contract with the club.

Ahead of the 2023–24 season, Asiimwe was integrated into Charlton Athletic's first-team squad. On 8 July 2023 – in the club's second pre-season match against Dartford at Princes Park – Asiimwe scored both goals in a 2–1 victory. On 19 July 2023, Asiimwe played his first game at The Valley in the club's final pre-season game of the 2023–24 season in a 3–2 defeat to Aberdeen. Asiimwe scored an own goal in the match after three minutes.

On 5 August 2023, Asiimwe played his first full League One game in the club's first match of the 2023–24 season, completing the full 90 minutes in a 1–0 victory over Leyton Orient.

==== Hartlepool United (loan) ====
On 19 September 2024, Asiimwe joined Hartlepool United on a short-term loan. On 21 September, Asiimwe started his first match for Hartlepool United, playing the first 60 minutes of a 1–0 home defeat to Dagenham & Redbridge. On 29 October, it was announced that Asiimwe would return to Charlton Athletic at the end of his short-term loan having made five appearances in total for Hartlepool.

==== Walsall (loan) ====
On 10 January 2025, Asiimwe joined League Two leaders Walsall on loan for the remainder of the season.

==== AFC Wimbledon (loan) ====
On 30 July 2025, Asiimwe joined AFC Wimbledon on a season-long loan from Charlton Athletic.

==== Salford City (loan) ====
On 1 September 2026, Asiimwe joined Salford City on a season-long loan.

== International career ==
On 18 March 2024, Asiimwe earned his first call-up for the Uganda national team ahead of their friendlies with Comoros and Ghana.

On 10 September 2026, Asiimwe was recalled to the Uganda national team ahead of their 2027 Africa Cup of Nations qualification campaign against Tunisia and Libya as well as for two friendlies against DR Congo.

On 24 September 2026, Asiimwe made his international debut starting - and playing the whole game - against Tunisia.

== Career statistics ==
=== Club ===
As of match played 31 October 2026

Appearances and goals by club, season and competition
Club	Season	League			FA Cup		EFL Cup		Other		Total	
Club	Season	Division	Apps	Goals	Apps	Goals	Apps	Goals	Apps	Goals	Apps	Goals
Charlton Athletic	2022–23	League One	1	0	0	0	0	0	1 (Note: Appearance(s) in EFL Trophy)	0	2	0
Charlton Athletic	2023–24	League One	17	0	3	0	0	0	3	0	23	0
Charlton Athletic	2024–25	League One	0	0	0	0	0	0	3	0	3	0
Charlton Athletic	2025–26	Championship	0	0	0	0	0	0	—		0	0
Charlton Athletic	2026–27	Championship	1	0	0	0	1	0	—		2	0
Charlton Athletic	Total		19	0	3	0	1	0	7	0	30	0
Hartlepool United (loan)	2024–25	National League	5	0	0	0	—		0	0	5	0
Walsall (loan)	2024–25	League Two	10	0	—		—		3 (Note: Appearances in the League Two play-offs.)	0	13	0
AFC Wimbledon (loan)	2025–26	League One	35	1	0	0	2	0	5	0	42	1
Salford City (loan)	2026–27	League Two	7	0	0	0	—		1	0	8	0
Career total			76	1	3	0	3	0	16	0	98	1

=== International ===
As of match played 17 November 2026

Appearances and goals by national team and year
National team	Year	Apps	Goals
Uganda
Uganda	2026	4	0
Total		4	0
