= Terry Taylor (footballer) =

Welsh footballer (born 2001)

Personal information
- Full name: Terence Charles Taylor
- Date of birth: 29 June 2001 (age 25)
- Place of birth: Irvine, Scotland
- Height: 1.83 m (6 ft 0 in)
- Position: Central midfielder

Team information
- Current team: Stevenage
- Number: 7

Youth career
- 2009–2017: Aberdeen
- 2017–2020: Wolverhampton Wanderers

Senior career*
Years	Team	Apps	(Gls)
2019–2021	Wolverhampton Wanderers	0	(0)
2020–2021	→ Grimsby Town (loan)	13	(0)
2021–2023	Burton Albion	58	(0)
2023–2026	Charlton Athletic	13	(0)
2025	→ Northampton Town (loan)	19	(1)
2025–2026	→ Northampton Town (loan)	42	(0)
2026–	Stevenage	9	(0)

International career^{‡}
2016–2018	Scotland U17	9	(0)
2018	Scotland U18	2	(0)
2019–2022	Wales U21	12	(2)
- * Club domestic league appearances and goals as of 17:10, 15 November 2026 (UTC) ‡ National team caps and goals as of 17:10, 5 September 2026 (UTC)

Terence Charles Taylor (born 29 June 2001) is a professional footballer who plays as a central midfielder for EFL League One club Stevenage. Born in Scotland, he represented Wales at under-21 international level.

== Club career ==
=== Wolverhampton Wanderers ===
Taylor made his first team debut for Wolverhampton Wanderers, whose academy he had progressed from after moving from his hometown Aberdeen, on 30 October 2019 in an EFL Cup tie against Aston Villa. He had also been part of the club's pre-season tour of China, where he played in the club's Premier League Asia Trophy Final victory against Manchester City.

==== Grimsby Town (loan) ====
On 7 September 2020, Taylor joined Grimsby Town on a season-long loan, with manager Ian Holloway stating Taylor was in line for his debut in an EFL Trophy tie with Harrogate Town the next day. After getting injured and missing out on Holloway's final five games before his resignation and not playing any games under new manager Paul Hurst, Wolves recalled Taylor in the winter transfer window.

=== Burton Albion ===
On 1 February 2021, Taylor joined League One side Burton Albion on a permanent deal, signing a two-and-a-half-year deal.

=== Charlton Athletic ===
On 26 July 2023, Taylor signed for Charlton Athletic on a three-year deal.

On 8 May 2026, it was confirmed that Taylor would leave the club following the expiration of his contract.

==== Northampton Town (loans) ====
On 22 January 2025, Taylor joined fellow League One side Northampton Town on loan for the remainder of the season.

On 4 March 2025, Taylor scored the first goal of his career while on loan at Northampton Town in a League One match against Stockport County.

On 11 August 2025, Taylor rejoined Northampton Town for a second time on a season-long loan.

=== Stevenage ===
On 26 June 2026, Taylor signed a two-year contract with the option of a further year with Stevenage on a free transfer.

== International career ==
Taylor played for both Scotland and Wales as a youth and qualifies for Wales through his mother, whose family are all Welsh, and was born in Cardiff. He represented Scotland at under-17 and under-18 level. He made his debut for the Wales under-21 team on 19 November 2019 as a second-half substitute in the 1–0 win against Bosnia-Herzegovina. He went on to represent the under-21 side a further five times, captaining them as well.

== Career statistics ==
As of match played 10 November 2026

Appearances and goals by club, season and competition
Club	Season	League			FA Cup		EFL Cup		Other		Total	
Club	Season	Division	Apps	Goals	Apps	Goals	Apps	Goals	Apps	Goals	Apps	Goals
Wolverhampton Wanderers	2019–20	Premier League	0	0	0	0	1	0	0	0	1	0
Wolverhampton Wanderers	2020–21	Premier League	0	0	0	0	0	0	—		0	0
Wolverhampton Wanderers	Total		0	0	0	0	1	0	0	0	1	0
Grimsby Town (loan)	2020–21	League Two	13	0	0	0	0	0	1 (Note: Appearance(s) in the EFL Trophy)	0	14	0
Burton Albion	2020–21	League One	16	0	0	0	0	0	0	0	16	0
Burton Albion	2021–22	League One	16	0	2	0	1	0	1	0	20	0
Burton Albion	2022–23	League One	26	0	3	0	1	0	3	0	33	0
Burton Albion	Total		58	0	5	0	2	0	4	0	69	0
Charlton Athletic	2023–24	League One	5	0	0	0	1	0	1	0	7	0
Charlton Athletic	2024–25	League One	8	0	2	0	0	0	4	0	14	0
Charlton Athletic	2025–26	Championship	0	0	0	0	0	0	—		0	0
Charlton Athletic	Total		13	0	2	0	1	0	5	0	21	0
Northampton Town (loan)	2024–25	League One	19	1	—		—		—		19	1
Northampton Town (loan)	2025–26	League One	42	0	1	0	1	0	5	0	49	0
Northampton Town (loan)	Total		61	1	1	0	1	0	5	0	68	1
Stevenage	2026–27	League One	9	0	1	0	2	0	2	0	14	0
Career total			154	1	9	0	7	0	17	0	187	1
