= Micah Mbick =

English footballer (born 2006)

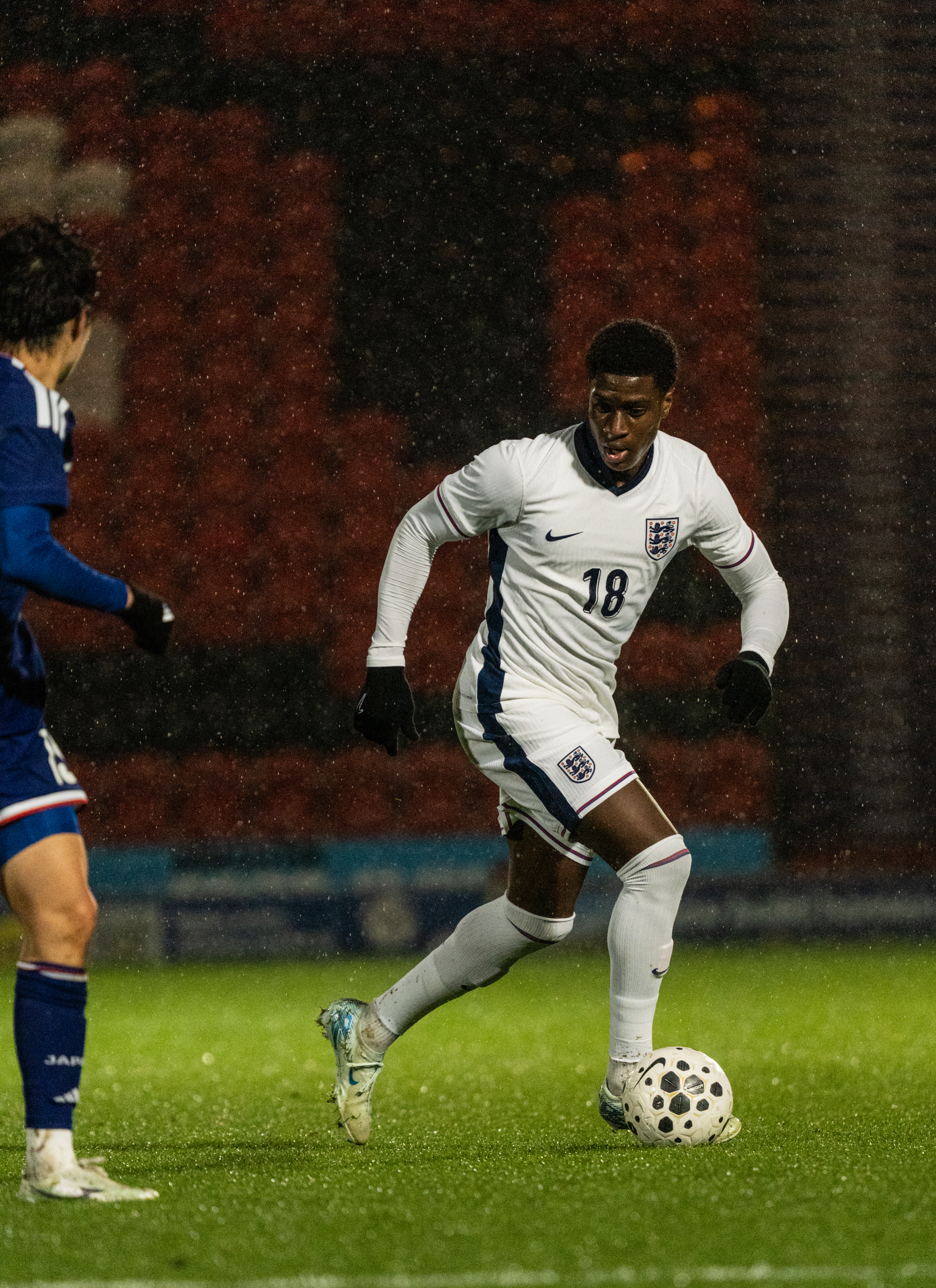
- Mbick vs Japan U20 in 2025

Personal information
- Full name: Micah Lionel Mbick
- Date of birth: 8 November 2006 (age 20)
- Place of birth: Newham, England
- Height: 1.92 m (6 ft 4 in)
- Position: Forward

Team information
- Current team: Charlton Athletic
- Number: 33

Youth career
- 2016–2025: Charlton Athletic

Senior career*
Years	Team	Apps	(Gls)
2023–	Charlton Athletic	14	(0)
2025–2026	→ Colchester United (loan)	22	(7)

International career^{‡}
2025–	England U20	1	(0)
- * Club domestic league appearances and goals as of 17:10, 24 October 2026 (UTC) ‡ National team caps and goals as of 17:10, 15 November 2025 (UTC)

Micah Lionel Mbick (born 8 November 2006) is an English professional footballer who plays as a forward for EFL Championship club Charlton Athletic.

== Club career ==
=== Charlton Athletic ===
Mbick joined the Charlton Athletic Academy at under-10s level, progressing through the ranks. On 15 November 2023, he made his senior debut, scoring just three minutes after having coming on as a late substitute in a 6–1 FA Cup First Round replay thrashing of eighth tier side Cray Valley Paper Mills.

Having featured a further two times in all competitions, he signed his first professional contract on 4 December 2023, making his league debut five days later.

On 4 July 2025, Mbick signed a new three-year contract with a club option of an additional year at Charlton Athletic.

==== Colchester United (loan) ====
On 1 September 2025, Mbick joined Colchester United until the end of the 2025–26 season.

On 12 March 2026, it was confirmed that Mbick would miss the remainder of the 2025–26 season after he suffered a serious knee injury in the club's 2–1 victory at Newport County on 7 March 2026.

== International career ==
On 7 November 2025, Mbick received his first call-up to the England U20s. He made his debut on 14 November 2025 during a 1–1 draw with Japan at the Eco-Power Stadium.

== Personal life ==
Born in England, Mbick is of Cameroonian descent. He holds English, Cameroonian and French nationalities.

== Career statistics ==
As of match played 24 October 2026

Appearances and goals by club, season and competition
Club	Season	League			FA Cup		EFL Cup		Other		Total	
Club	Season	Division	Apps	Goals	Apps	Goals	Apps	Goals	Apps	Goals	Apps	Goals
Charlton Athletic	2023–24	League One	2	0	2	1	0	0	1 (Note: One appearance in the EFL Trophy)	0	5	1
Charlton Athletic	2024–25	League One	4	0	0	0	0	0	1 (Note: One appearance in the League One play-offs.)	0	5	0
Charlton Athletic	2025–26	Championship	0	0	0	0	1	0	—		1	0
Charlton Athletic	2026–27	Championship	8	0	0	0	1	0	—		9	0
Charlton Athletic	Charlton Athletic total		14	0	2	1	2	0	2	0	20	1
Colchester United (loan)	2025–26	League Two	22	7	1	1	—		2 (Note: Two appearances and one goal in the EFL Trophy)	1	25	9
Career total			36	7	3	2	2	0	4	1	45	10

== Honours ==
Charlton Athletic

- EFL League One play-offs: 2025
