= Joshua Laqeretabua =

Fijian footballer (born 2005)

Personal information
- Full name: Joshua Laqeretabua
- Date of birth: 26 September 2005 (age 21)
- Place of birth: Maidstone, England
- Height: 1.85 m (6 ft 1 in)
- Position: Defender

Team information
- Current team: Eastleigh (on loan from Charlton Athletic)
- Number: 28

Youth career
- 2013–2023: Charlton Athletic

Senior career*
Years	Team	Apps	(Gls)
2023–	Charlton Athletic	3	(0)
2026	→ Bath City (loan)	12	(1)
2026	→ Dorking Wanderers (loan)	5	(0)
2026–	→ Eastleigh (loan)	1	(0)

International career^{‡}
2023	Fiji U20	2	(0)
- * Club domestic league appearances and goals as of 17:10, 14 November 2026 (UTC) ‡ National team caps and goals as of 15:10, 11 September 2025 (UTC)

Joshua Laqeretabua (born 26 September 2005) is a professional footballer who plays for National League club Eastleigh on loan from EFL Championship club Charlton Athletic. Born in England, he represents Fiji at youth level.

== Club career ==
=== Charlton Athletic ===
Laqeretabua joined the academy of Charlton Athletic at the under-9 level. He won the 2022–23 league championship with the under-18 side. In July 2023, he signed his first professional contract with the club, a two-year deal.

Laqeretabua made his competitive debut for Charlton's senior side on 5 September 2023 in a 3–4 loss to Crawley Town in the 2023–24 EFL Trophy.

Laqeretabua made his first League One appearance for Charlton on 26 November 2024, coming off the bench in the 87th minute of a 1–0 win away at Burton Albion.

On 13 January 2025, Laqeretabua signed a new long-term contract with Charlton Athletic, putting pen-to-paper on a three-and-a-half year deal, keeping him at the club until 2028 with the addition of a club option of an extra year.

==== Bath City (loan) ====
On 13 March 2026, Laqeretabua joined Bath City on loan until the end of the season.

==== Dorking Wanderers (loan) ====
On 8 August 2026, Laqeretabua returned to the National League South, joining Dorking Wanderers on a short-term loan.

On 1 September 2026, Laqeretabua was recalled from his loan by Charlton Athletic.

==== Eastleigh (loan) ====
On 5 November 2026, Laqeretabua joined National League, side Eastleigh on a short-term loan.

== International career ==
Laqeretabua's parents are from Fiji's Tailevu Province. In 2022, he was identified as one of the promising Fijian footballers who would make up the next generation of the country's national team. In February 2023, at age seventeen, he accepted a call-up to the Fiji under-20 team for a training camp ahead of the 2023 FIFA U-20 World Cup, despite being on the radar of the English FA. About the call up, Laqeretabua said, "It has always been my dream to be called up to play for my parents' country of birth." He went on to be part of Fiji's final squad for the tournament, making two appearances.

== Career statistics ==
As of match played 14 November 2026

Appearances and goals by club, season and competition
Club	Season	League			FA Cup		EFL Cup		Other		Total	
Club	Season	Division	Apps	Goals	Apps	Goals	Apps	Goals	Apps	Goals	Apps	Goals
Charlton Athletic	2023–24	League One	0	0	0	0	0	0	2 (Note: Two appearances in the EFL Trophy)	0	2	0
Charlton Athletic	2024–25	League One	2	0	1	0	0	0	3 (Note: Three appearances in the EFL Trophy)	0	6	0
Charlton Athletic	2025–26	Championship	1	0	0	0	1	0	—		2	0
Charlton Athletic	2026–27	Championship	0	0	0	0	0	0	—		0	0
Charlton Athletic	Charlton Athletic total		3	0	1	0	1	0	5	0	10	0
Bath City (loan)	2025–26	National League South	12	1	—		—		—		12	1
Dorking Wanderers (loan)	2026–27	National League South	5	0	0	0	—		—		5	0
Eastleigh (loan)	2026–27	National League	1	0	1	0	—		0	0	2	0
Career total			21	1	2	0	1	0	5	0	29	1
