= Tyreece Campbell =

Jamaican footballer (born 2003)

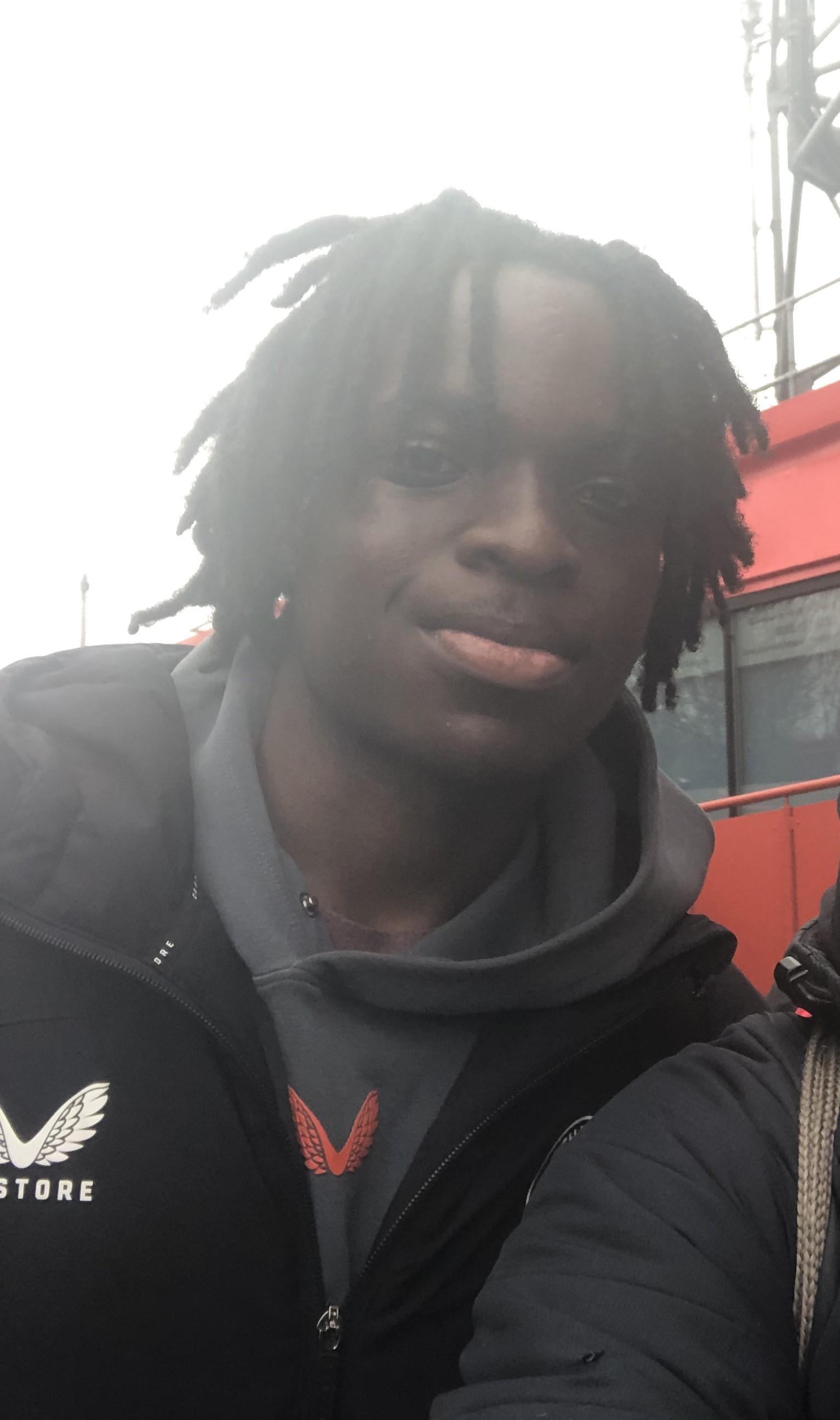
- Campbell in 2025

Personal information
- Full name: Tyreece Anthony Tupac Shakur Campbell
- Date of birth: 14 September 2003 (age 23)
- Place of birth: Southwark, England
- Height: 1.78 m (5 ft 10 in)
- Position: Forward

Team information
- Current team: Charlton Athletic
- Number: 7

Youth career
- 2012–2022: Charlton Athletic

Senior career*
Years	Team	Apps	(Gls)
2022–	Charlton Athletic	162	(18)

International career^{‡}
2025–	Jamaica	12	(1)
- * Club domestic league appearances and goals as of 17:10, 21 November 2026 (UTC) ‡ National team caps and goals as of 17:10, 6 October 2026 (UTC)

Tyreece Anthony Tupac Shakur Campbell (born 14 September 2003) is a professional footballer who plays as a forward or winger for EFL Championship club Charlton Athletic. Born in England, he plays for the Jamaica national team.

== Club career ==
Campbell joined Charlton Athletic at the age of nine, after having a trial at Crystal Palace. He signed his first professional contract on 21 July 2021.

He made his professional debut for Charlton in a 4–0 League One defeat at home to Oxford United on 19 February 2022. He made his first professional start – playing the opening 62 minutes – in a 1–0 League One victory away at Shrewsbury Town on 22 October 2022. He scored his first senior goal in the 19th minute of their 2–0 victory over Barnsley at The Valley in League One on 14 January 2023.

On 3 May 2024, Campbell signed a new two-year contract with an option of an additional year with Charlton Athletic.

On 8 May 2026, it was confirmed that the club had exercised their option to extend Campbell's contract until the summer of 2027.

On 25 August 2026, Campbell signed a new four-year contract with Charlton Athletic.

== International career ==
On 19 May 2025, Campbell made the preliminary 60-man squad for the Jamaica national team for the 2025 CONCACAF Gold Cup.

On 3 June 2025 Campbell made the 24-man squad for the Jamaica national team for the 2026 FIFA World Cup qualification – CONCACAF second round.

Campbell made his debut for Jamaica on 10 June 2025, replacing Renaldo Cephas after 84 minutes in a 3–0 victory over Guatemala.

== Personal life ==
Born in England, Campbell is of Jamaican descent. His parents gave his middle names in honour of American rapper Tupac Shakur, of whom they were fans; Campbell does not listen to his music.

== Career statistics ==
=== Club ===
As of match played 21 November 2026

Appearances and goals by club, season and competition
Club	Season	League			FA Cup		EFL Cup		Other		Total	
Club	Season	Division	Apps	Goals	Apps	Goals	Apps	Goals	Apps	Goals	Apps	Goals
Charlton Athletic	2021–22	League One	2	0	0	0	0	0	0	0	2	0
Charlton Athletic	2022–23	League One	22	2	3	0	0	0	4 (Note: Appearances in EFL Trophy)	0	29	2
Charlton Athletic	2023–24	League One	33	2	2	1	1	0	4	1	40	4
Charlton Athletic	2024–25	League One	44	7	2	1	1	0	6 (Note: Three appearances and one goal in the EFL Trophy and three appearances in the League One play-offs)	1	53	9
Charlton Athletic	2025–26	Championship	45	3	1	0	0	0	—		46	3
Charlton Athletic	2026–27	Championship	16	4	0	0	1	1	—		17	5
Career total			162	18	8	2	3	1	14	2	187	23

=== International ===
As of match played 5 October 2026

International statistics
National team	Year	Apps	Goals
Jamaica	2025	6	0
Jamaica	2026	6	1
Total		12	1

=== International goals ===
List of international goals scored by Tyreece Campbell
No.	Cap	Date	Venue	Opponent	Score	Result	Competition	Ref
1.	12	5 October 2026	Chelato Uclés National Stadium, Tegucigalpa, Honduras	Honduras	1–0	1–1	CONCACAF Nations League A	

== Honours ==
Charlton Athletic

- EFL League One play-offs: 2025
