= Zach Mitchell =

English footballer (born 2005)

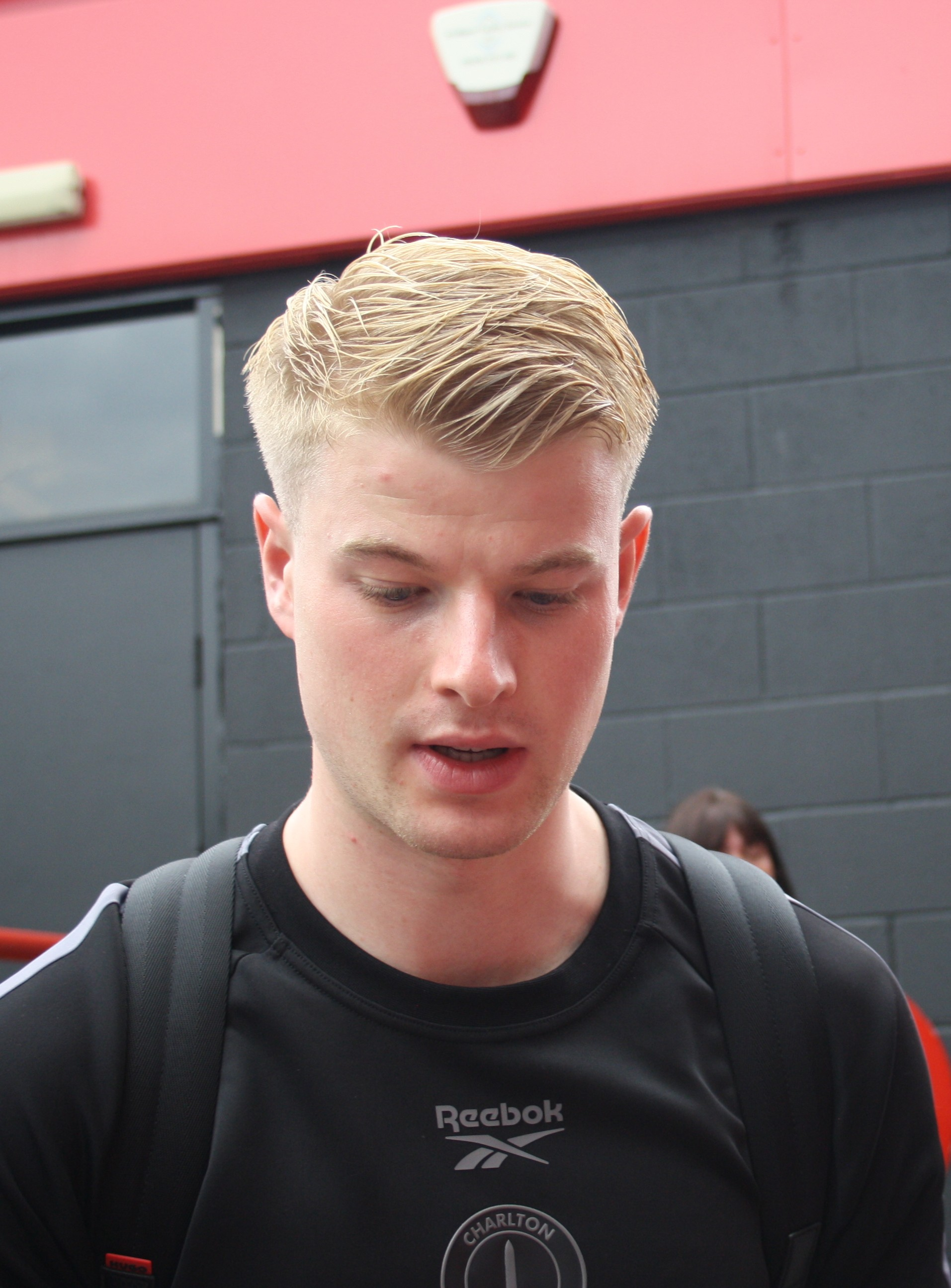
- Zach Mitchell in 2025.

Personal information
- Full name: Zach Joseph Mitchell
- Date of birth: 9 January 2005 (age 21)
- Place of birth: Bromley, England
- Height: 1.88 m (6 ft 2 in)
- Position: Centre-back

Team information
- Current team: Charlton Athletic

Youth career
- 2012–2022: Charlton Athletic

Senior career*
Years	Team	Apps	(Gls)
2022–	Charlton Athletic	7	(0)
2023–2024	→ Colchester United (loan)	23	(1)
2025	→ St Johnstone (loan)	8	(0)
2025–2026	→ Hibernian (loan)	2	(0)
2026	→ St Johnstone (loan)	6	(0)

International career^{‡}
2019	England U15	1	(0)
- * Club domestic league appearances and goals as of 17:10, 30 September 2026 (UTC) ‡ National team caps and goals as of 15:10, 11 September 2025 (UTC)

Zach Joseph Mitchell (born 9 January 2005) is an English professional footballer who plays as a centre-back for EFL Championship club Charlton Athletic.

== Career ==
=== Charlton Athletic ===
Coming through the youth system of Charlton Athletic, Mitchell penned his first professional contract with the club on 27 July 2022.

Mitchell made his professional debut for Charlton, playing the first 65 minutes of a 2–1 EFL Trophy victory at home against Brighton & Hove Albion U21 on 2 November 2022.

Mitchell made his second appearance for the club just four days later, on 5 November 2022, coming off the bench after just 18 minutes for the injured Terell Thomas, in the 4–1 FA Cup first round victory over Coalville Town.

On 18 October 2024, Mitchell signed a new two-and-a-half year contract keeping him at the club until 2027 with a club option of an extra year.

==== Colchester United (loan) ====
On 1 September 2023, Mitchell joined Colchester United on a season-long loan.

==== St Johnstone (first loan) ====
On 3 February 2025, Mitchell joined St Johnstone on loan until the end of the 2024–25 season.

==== Hibernian (loan) ====
On 5 September 2025, Mitchell joined Hibernian on loan until the end of the 2025–26 season.

On 19 January 2026, Mitchell was recalled from his loan by Charlton Athletic having only made two first-team appearances for Hibernian since joining.

==== St Johnstone (second loan) ====
On 6 July 2026, Mitchell returned to St Johnstone on loan until the end of the 2026–27 season.

On 30 September 2026, it was confirmed that Mitchell had returned to Charlton Athletic following a season-ending knee injury.

== International ==
On 15 December 2019 Mitchell represented the England U15 team against Turkey.

== Personal life ==
Mitchell is the brother of Sheffield Wednesday player Billy Mitchell.

== Career statistics ==
As of match played 19 September 2026

Appearances and goals by club, season and competition
Club	Season	League			National cup (Note: Includes FA Cup, Scottish Cup)		League cup (Note: Includes EFL Cup, Scottish League Cup)		Other (Note: Includes EFL Trophy, Scottish League Challenge Cup)		Total	
Club	Season	Division	Apps	Goals	Apps	Goals	Apps	Goals	Apps	Goals	Apps	Goals
Charlton Athletic	2022–23	League One	6	0	2	0	0	0	2 (Note: Appearances in the EFL Trophy)	0	10	0
Charlton Athletic	2023–24	League One	0	0	0	0	1	0	0	0	1	0
Charlton Athletic	2024–25	League One	1	0	2	1	1	0	3	0	7	1
Charlton Athletic	2025–26	Championship	0	0	0	0	2	0	—		2	0
Charlton Athletic	2026–27	Championship	0	0	0	0	0	0	—		0	0
Charlton Athletic	Total		7	0	4	1	4	0	5	0	20	1
Colchester United (loan)	2023–24	League Two	23	1	1	1	0	0	4	0	28	2
St Johnstone (loan)	2024–25	Scottish Premiership	8	0	2	0	—		—		10	0
Hibernian (loan)	2025–26	Scottish Premiership	2	0	0	0	0	0	—		2	0
Hibernian U20 (loan)	2025–26	—	—		—		—		1 (Note: Appearances in the Scottish League Challenge Cup)	1	1	1
St Johnstone (loan)	2026–27	Scottish Premiership	6	0	0	0	3	0	—		9	0
Career total			46	1	7	2	7	0	10	1	70	4

== Honours ==
Individual

- EFL League One Apprentice of the Season: 2022–23
