= Kai Enslin =

English footballer (born 2005)

Kai Enslin エンスリン海
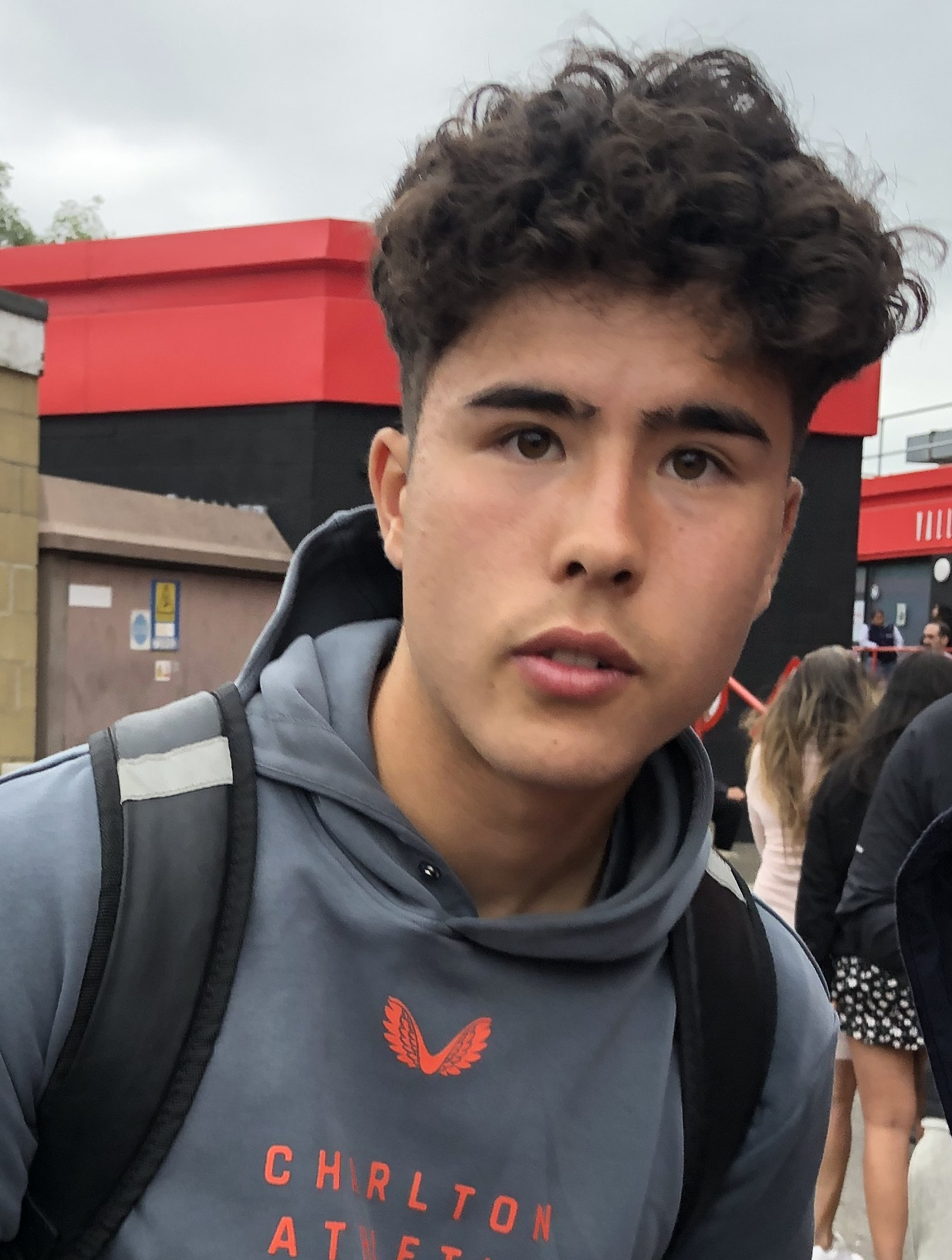
- Enslin in 2025

Personal information
- Full name: Kai Kobashi Enslin
- Date of birth: 22 October 2005 (age 21)
- Place of birth: Camden, England
- Height: 1.82 m (6 ft 0 in)
- Position: Midfielder

Team information
- Current team: Dorking Wanderers (on loan from Charlton Athletic)
- Number: 35

Youth career
- Whyteleafe
- 2017–2024: Charlton Athletic

Senior career*
Years	Team	Apps	(Gls)
2024–	Charlton Athletic	1	(0)
2026	→ Dorking Wanderers (loan)	14	(0)
2026–	→ Dorking Wanderers (loan)	1	(0)
- * Club domestic league appearances and goals as of 17:10, 21 November 2026 (UTC)

Kai Kobashi Enslin (小橋エンスリン海, Enslin Kai; born 22 October 2005) is an English professional footballer who plays as a midfielder for Dorking Wanderers on loan from EFL Championship club Charlton Athletic.

== Club career ==
=== Charlton Athletic ===
Having come through the youth system of Charlton Athletic since joining at U12 level from Whyteleafe, Enslin signed his first professional deal with the club on 2 June 2023.

Enslin made his professional debut for the club as a 19–year–old, playing the full match in a 1–0 EFL Trophy victory at The Valley against Bromley on 12 November 2024.

On 21 March 2025, Enslin signed a new long-term contract with the club.

On 3 May 2025, Enslin made his League One debut for Charlton Athletic, coming off the bench in the 88th minute in a 3–1 final day victory over Burton Albion.

==== Dorking Wanderers (first loan) ====
On 20 February 2026, Enslin joined National League South club, Dorking Wanderers on loan for the remainder of the season.

==== Dorking Wanderers (second loan) ====
On 12 November 2026, Enslin re-joined Dorking Wanderers on a short-term loan until 3 January 2027.

== Personal life ==
Enslin was born in England to a South African father and Japanese mother.

== Career statistics ==
As of match played 21 November 2026

Appearances and goals by club, season and competition
Club	Season	League			FA Cup		EFL Cup		Other		Total	
Club	Season	Division	Apps	Goals	Apps	Goals	Apps	Goals	Apps	Goals	Apps	Goals
Charlton Athletic	2024–25	League One	1	0	0	0	0	0	1 (Note: One appearance in the EFL Trophy)	0	2	0
Charlton Athletic	2025–26	Championship	0	0	0	0	2	0	—		2	0
Charlton Athletic	2026–27	Championship	0	0	0	0	0	0	—		0	0
Charlton Athletic	Charlton Athletic total		1	0	0	0	2	0	1	0	4	0
Dorking Wanderers (loan)	2025–26	National League South	14	0	—		—		2 (Note: Two appearances in the National League South play-offs)	0	16	0
Dorking Wanderers (loan)	2026–27	National League South	1	0	—		—		1 (Note: One appearance in the FA Trophy)	0	2	0
Career total			16	0	0	0	2	0	4	0	22	0

== Honours ==
Charlton Athletic

- EFL League One play-offs: 2025
