= Jacob Roddy =

English footballer (born 2003)

Personal information
- Full name: Jacob Gerrard Roddy
- Date of birth: 10 April 2003 (age 23)
- Place of birth: Trowbridge, England
- Position: Left-back

Team information
- Current team: Dover Athletic

Youth career
- 2013–2019: Southampton
- 2019–2021: Bradfield College

Senior career*
Years	Team	Apps	(Gls)
2021–2024	Charlton Athletic	1	(0)
2023	→ Weston-super-Mare (loan)	1	(0)
2023–2024	→ Oxford City (loan)	19	(1)
2024–2026	Oxford City	62	(2)
2026–	Dover Athletic	0	(0)
- * Club domestic league appearances and goals as of 14:00, 15 August 2026 (UTC)

Jacob Gerrard Roddy (born 10 April 2003) is an English professional footballer who plays as a left-back for National League South club Dover Athletic.

== Career ==
=== Charlton Athletic ===
A youth product of Southampton and Bradfield College, Roddy signed with Charlton Athletic on 5 July 2021. He made his professional debut with Charlton in a 1–0 EFL Cup loss to Wimbledon on 10 August 2021. Jacob is the son of Charlton Athletic former technical director, Ged Roddy.

On 7 May 2023, Roddy made his League One debut for Charlton Athletic, coming on in the 85th minute of the club's final game of the 2022–23 season during a 2–2 draw away at Cheltenham Town.

On 22 May 2024, it was confirmed that Roddy would leave Charlton Athletic upon the expiry of his contract.

==== Weston-super-Mare (loan) ====
On 12 October 2023, Roddy joined National League South side, Weston-super-Mare, on a month's loan.

==== Oxford City (loan) ====
On 23 December 2023, Roddy joined National League side, Oxford City, on a month-long loan.

=== Oxford City ===
On 3 August 2024, Roddy joined Oxford City on a permanent basis.

=== Dover Athletic ===
On 15 August 2026, Roddy joined National League South club Dover Athletic.

== Career statistics ==
As of match played 25 April 2026

Appearances and goals by club, season and competition
Club	Season	League			FA Cup		EFL Cup		Other		Total	
Club	Season	Division	Apps	Goals	Apps	Goals	Apps	Goals	Apps	Goals	Apps	Goals
Charlton Athletic	2021–22	League One	0	0	0	0	1	0	1 (Note: One appearance in EFL Trophy)	0	2	0
Charlton Athletic	2022–23	League One	1	0	0	0	0	0	0	0	1	0
Charlton Athletic	2023–24	League One	0	0	0	0	0	0	1 (Note: One appearance in EFL Trophy)	0	1	0
Charlton Athletic	Charlton Athletic total		1	0	0	0	1	0	2	0	4	0
Weston-super-Mare (loan)	2023–24	National League South	1	0	1	0	—		0	0	2	0
Oxford City (loan)	2023–24	National League	19	1	—		—		0	0	19	1
Oxford City	2024–25	National League North	27	1	0	0	—		2 (Note: Two appearances in FA Trophy)	0	29	1
Oxford City	2025–26	National League North	35	1	0	0	—		1 (Note: One appearance in FA Trophy)	0	36	1
Oxford City	Oxford City total		81	3	0	0	0	0	3	0	84	3
Career total			83	3	1	0	1	0	5	0	90	3
