= Tolu Ladapo =

English footballer

Personal information
- Full name: Joseph Toluwadara Oluwabamirin Temitayo Ladapo
- Date of birth: 21 March 2004 (age 22)
- Place of birth: Greenwich, England
- Position: Forward

Team information
- Current team: Carshalton Athletic

Youth career
- 2019–2024: Charlton Athletic

Senior career*
Years	Team	Apps	(Gls)
2022–2024	Charlton Athletic	0	(0)
2023–2024	→ Hungerford Town (loan)	3	(0)
2024–2025	Lewes	33	(2)
2025–	Carshalton Athletic	35	(7)
- * Club domestic league appearances and goals as of 17:10, 2 May 2026 (UTC)

Joseph Toluwadara Oluwabamirin Temitayo Ladapo is an English professional footballer who plays as a forward for Isthmian League Premier Division club Carshalton Athletic.

== Career ==
=== Charlton Athletic ===
Coming through the youth system of Charlton Athletic, Ladapo signed his first professional contract with the club on 11 July 2022.

He made his professional debut for Charlton, coming off the bench in the 85th minute of a 3–0 EFL Trophy victory at home against Gillinghan on 31 August 2022.

On 22 May 2024, it was confirmed that Ladapo would leave Charlton Athletic upon the expiry of his contract.

==== Hungerford Town (loan) ====
On 15 December 2023, Ladapo joined Southern League Premier Division South side, Hungerford Town, on month-long loan.

=== Non-League ===
In August 2024, Ladapo joined Lewes.

In September 2025, Ladapo joined fellow Isthmian League Premier Division club Carshalton Athletic.

== Personal life ==
Born in London, England, Ladapo is of Nigerian descent.

== Career statistics ==
As of match played 18 April 2026

Appearances and goals by club, season and competition
Club	Season	League			FA Cup		EFL Cup		Other		Total	
Club	Season	Division	Apps	Goals	Apps	Goals	Apps	Goals	Apps	Goals	Apps	Goals
Charlton Athletic	2022–23	League One	0	0	0	0	0	0	1 (Note: One appearance in the EFL Trophy)	0	1	0
Charlton Athletic	2023–24	League One	0	0	0	0	0	0	0	0	0	0
Charlton Athletic	Charlton Athletic total		0	0	0	0	0	0	1	0	1	0
Hungerford Town (loan)	2023–24	Southern League Premier Division South	3	0	—		—		0	0	3	0
Lewes	2024–25	Isthmian League; Premier Division	33	2	2	0	—		5 (Note: Three appearances in the FA Trophy, two appearances in the Sussex Senior Cup)	2	40	4
Carshalton Athletic	2025–26	Isthmian League; Premier Division	35	7	0	0	—		1 (Note: One appearance in the Velocity Cup)	0	36	7
Career total			71	9	2	0	0	0	7	2	80	11
