= 2025–26 Premier League Cup =

Tournament details
- Country: England; Wales
- Teams: 32

Final positions
- Champions: Burnley (1st Title)
- Runners-up: Sunderland (1st Runner up)

Tournament statistics
- Matches played: 111
- Goals scored: 411 (3.7 per match)
- Attendance: 18,761 (169 per match)
- Top goal scorer: (England) Marshall Francis (Sheffield United) (6 Goals)
- All statistics correct as of 14 May 2026.

The 2025–26 Premier League Cup was the twelfth edition of the competition. 32 academies participated this season 4 fewer than last time after expanding to 36 last season. 7 academies that participated last season did not return this year. Huddersfield Town did not return after 5 consecutive seasons in the competition, Brighton & Hove Albion did not return after a 3-year stint, Chelsea, Fleetwood Town, and Leeds United did not return after 2 consecutive seasons, and finally Everton, and Southampton did not return after playing last year. In terms of teams returning to the competition only 2 returned after a long absence, Millwall returned for the first time since the competition was a knockout only in 2015–16, and Stoke City returned after a 2-season absence. There was one newcomer to the competition, Leyton Orient who participated for the first time.

== Participants ==
=== Category 1 ===
- Blackburn Rovers
- Birmingham City
- Burnley
- Derby County
- Ipswich Town
- Leicester City
- Norwich City
- Nottingham Forest
- Reading
- Stoke City
- Sunderland
- West Bromwich Albion
- Wolverhampton Wanderers

=== Category 2 ===
- AFC Bournemouth
- Brentford
- Bristol City
- Cardiff City
- Charlton Athletic
- Colchester United
- Coventry City
- Hull City
- Millwall
- Queens Park Rangers
- Sheffield United
- Swansea City
- Watford

=== Category 3 ===
- Exeter City
- Leyton Orient
- Luton Town
- Preston North End
- Stockport County

=== Category 4 ===
- Bromley

== Group stage ==
=== Group A ===
Team	Pld	W	D	L	GF	GA	GD	Pts
Reading (A)	6	5	0	1	10	3	+7	15
AFC Bournemouth (A)	6	3	2	1	15	10	+5	11
Hull City (E)	6	2	0	4	12	12	0	6
Birmingham City (E)	6	0	2	4	5	17	−12	2

Updated to match(es) played on 22 January 2026. Source:
(A) Advance to a further round; (E) Eliminated

2 September 2025	Hull City	5–1	Birmingham City	Kingston Upon Hull
19:00 BST	Belloumi 42', 47'; Moore 56'; Brown 64', 84'	Report	Da Silva 29'	Stadium: MKM Stadium; Attendance: 310; Referee: Garreth Rhodes

12 September 2025	Reading	2–1	AFC Bournemouth	Aldershot
19:00 BST	Okine-Peters 64'; Duah 90+1'	Report	Day 71'	Stadium: Recreation Ground; Attendance: 106; Referee: Paul Tierney

10 October 2025	AFC Bournemouth	4–1	Hull City	Bournemouth
19:00 BST	Dacosta 18' (pen.); Stevens 34'; Sills 72'; Mottoh 74'	Report	Parker 36'	Stadium: Dean Court; Attendance: 149; Referee: Harry Wager

16 October 2025	Birmingham City	0–3	Reading	Tiddington
19:00 BST		Report	Patton 24' (pen.); Hicks 38', 83'	Stadium: DCS Stadium; Attendance: 80; Referee: Scott Jackson

21 November 2025	Hull City	0–2	Reading	North Ferriby
19:00 GMT		Report	Okine-Peters 21'; Leach 53' (o.g.)	Stadium: Grange Lane; Attendance: 82; Referee: Dean Watson

24 November 2025	Birmingham City	2–2	AFC Bournemouth	Stratford upon Avon
19:00 GMT	Mazwi 56'; Maddox 73'	Report	Dacosta Gonzalez 42'; Stevens 53'	Stadium: Knights Lane; Attendance: 73; Referee: George Laflin

1 December 2025	Birmingham City	0–3	Hull City	Tiddington
19:00 GMT		Report	Henia-Kamau 72'; Ocaya 74'; Parker 82'	Stadium: Knights Lane; Attendance: 100; Referee: Kavan Hurn

5 December 2025	Hull City	3–4	AFC Bournemouth	North Ferriby
19:00 GMT	McCarthy 72'; Parker 76'; Vaughan 90+4'	Report	Howard 15' (o.g.); William 33'; Dacosta González 45+1', 90'	Stadium: Knights Lane; Attendance: 62; Referee: Scott Jackson

13 December 2025	Reading	2–0	Birmingham City	Reading
13:00 GMT	Patton 39' (pen.); Hicks 42'	Report		Stadium: Madejski Stadium; Attendance: 173; Referee: Declan Bourne

19 December 2025	Reading	1–0	Hull City	Aldershot
19:00 GMT	Devine 33' (o.g.)	Report		Stadium: Recreation Ground; Attendance: 127; Referee: Will Briers

22 December 2025	AFC Bournemouth	2–2	Birmingham City	Totton
19:00 GMT	Dacosta Gonzalez 38'; Ndimukum 89'	Report	Briscoe 23'; Wynne 30'	Stadium: Testwood Stadium; Attendance: 231; Referee: Lewis Sandoe

22 January 2026	AFC Bournemouth	2–0	Reading	Bournemouth
19:00 GMT	Nyarko 50', 66'	Report		Stadium: AFC Bournemouth Performance Centre; Attendance: 47; Referee: Alan Young
Note: match was originally going to be played on 1 December 2025 but was postponed due to a frozen pitch, then was postponed again on 6 January 2026 due to yet an other frozen pitch.

=== Group B ===
Team	Pld	W	D	L	GF	GA	GD	Pts
Sheffield United (Q)	6	6	0	0	14	7	+7	18
Stoke City (Q)	6	1	3	2	10	12	−2	6
Derby County (E)	6	1	2	3	15	12	+3	5
Bristol City (E)	6	1	1	4	10	18	−8	4

Updated to match(es) played on 6 January 2026. Source:
(E) Eliminated; (Q) Qualified for the phase indicated

12 September 2025	Sheffield United	2–1	Derby County	York
19:00 BST	Asante-Boakye 24'; Giggs 81'	Report	McAndrew 55' (pen.)	Stadium: York Community Stadium; Attendance: 79; Referee: James Bancroft

13 September 2025	Bristol City	1–1	Stoke City	Failand
15:30 BST	Derrick 11'	Report	Fawunmi 61'	Stadium: Robins High Performance Centre; Attendance: 75; Referee: William Davis

20 October 2025	Derby County	8–2	Bristol City	Matlock
19:00 BST	Eames 3'; Allen 7', 25'; Wilson 10', 15'; Osong 31'; Oguntolu 63', 75'	Report	Sheppard 34' (pen.); Phillips 45+7'	Stadium: Causeway Lane; Attendance: 151 or 150; Referee: Richard Holmes

28 October 2025	Stoke City	1–2	Sheffield United	Newcastle-under-Lyme
19:00 GMT	Enabulele 30'	Report	Aston 41'; Francis 57'	Stadium: Lyme Valley Stadium; Attendance: 134; Referee: Lewis Dawson

21 November 2025	Derby County	2–2	Stoke City	Matlock
19:00 GMT	Osong 2'; Oguntolu 30'	Report	Otegbayo 33'; Enabulele 38'	Stadium: Causeway Lane; Attendance: 203; Referee: Paul Johnson

30 November 2025	Stoke City	3–2	Bristol City	Newcastle-under-Lyme
14:00 GMT	Fawunmi 66', 90+1'; Yeboah 80' (o.g.)	Report	Skinner 59', 90+3'	Stadium: Lyme Valley Stadium; Attendance: 55; Referee: Dean Watson

5 December 2025	Sheffield United	2–1	Bristol City	York
19:00 GMT	Marsh 5'; Francis 68'	Report	Hooper 48'	Stadium: York Community Stadium; Attendance: 50; Referee: Garreth Rhodes
Note: match was originally going to be played 21 November 2025 but was postponed due to a waterlogged pitch.

15 December 2025	Sheffield United	4–2	Stoke City	York
19:00 GMT	Hampson 20'; Marsh 33', 67', 90+6' (pen.)	Report	Willox 28'; Sachdev 61'	Stadium: York Community Stadium; Attendance: 65; Referee: Richard Aspinall

16 December 2025	Bristol City	3–2	Derby County	Failand
19:00 GMT	Skinner 11'; Sheppard 63'; Yeboah 67'	Report	Eames 34'; Oguntolu 84'	Stadium: Robins High Performance Centre; Attendance: 128; Referee: Greg Rollason

21 December 2025	Stoke City	1–1	Derby County	Newcastle-under-Lyme
14:00 GMT	Curley 90+8'	Report	Oguntolu 69'	Stadium: Lyme Valley Stadium; Attendance: 187; Referee: Melissa Burgin

22 December 2025	Bristol City	1–2	Sheffield United	Failand
19:00 GMT	Yeboah 23'	Report	Francis 39', 89'	Stadium: Robins High Performance Centre; Attendance: 90; Referee: Matthew Scholes

6 January 2026	Derby County	1–2	Sheffield United	Derby
19:00 GMT	Wilson 50'	Report	Francis 27', 77'	Stadium: Derby County Football Academy; Attendance: 75; Referee: Matthew McQuillan
Note: match was originally going to be played 28 November 2025 but was postponed

=== Group C ===
Team	Pld	W	D	L	GF	GA	GD	Pts
Ipswich Town (A)	6	4	1	1	12	4	+8	13
Charlton Athletic (A)	6	3	1	2	9	14	−5	10
Leicester City (E)	6	2	0	4	11	9	+2	6
Preston North End (E)	6	1	2	3	6	11	−5	5

Updated to match(es) played on 12 January 2026. Source:
(A) Advance to a further round; (E) Eliminated

23 September 2025	Preston North End	1–2	Charlton Athletic	Chorley
19:00 BST	Gryba 55'	Report	Sol-Loza 79'; Rylah 90+2'	Stadium: Victory Park; Attendance: 200; Referee: Niall Smith

7 October 2025	Preston North End	2–0	Leicester City	Chorley
19:00 BST	Frøkjær-Jensen 16'; Adedeji 37'	Report		Stadium: Victory Park; Attendance: 140; Referee: Steven Copeland

17 October 2025	Leicester City	3–4	Charlton Athletic	Seagrave
19:00 BST	Amartey 36'; Evans 56', 66'	Report	Brown 68'; Casey 71'; Sol-Loza 74'; Rylah 87'	Stadium: Leicester City F.C. Training Ground; Attendance: 141; Referee: Harry Warner

28 October 2025	Ipswich Town	2–2	Preston North End	Needham Market
19:00 GMT	Mauge 12', 16'	Report	Brindle 61' (pen.); Wilson 83'	Stadium: Bloomfields; Attendance: 150 or 70; Referee: Lewis Smith

18 November 2025	Charlton Athletic	2–1	Ipswich Town	Charlton
19:00 GMT	Casey 3'; Lock 90+1'	Report 1Report 2	Laqeretabua 80' (o.g.)	Stadium: The Valley; Attendance: 111; Referee: Lewis Sandoe

21 November 2025	Leicester City	0–2	Ipswich Town	Seagrave
19:00 GMT		Report	Fletcher 15'; Nelson 67'	Stadium: Leicester City F.C. Training Ground; Attendance: 183; Referee: Aji Ajibola

1 December 2025	Ipswich Town	1–0	Leicester City	Ipswich
19:00 GMT	Fletcher 17'	Report		Stadium: Portman Road; Attendance: 455; Referee: Paul Johnson

2 December 2025	Charlton Athletic	1–1	Preston North End	Dartford
19:00 GMT	Lock 46'	Report	Pasiek 65'	Stadium: Princes Park; Attendance: 117; Referee: George Laflin

16 December 2025	Charlton Athletic	0–5	Leicester City	Dartford
19:00 GMT		Report	Evans 7'; Khela 16'; Carr 61'; Ali 85'; Daniels 89'	Stadium: Princes Park; Referee: Harrison Blair

19 December 2025	Leicester City	3–0	Preston North End	Seagrave
19:00 GMT	Richards 56'; Otchere 66'; Omobolaji 83'	Report		Stadium: Seagrave Training Ground; Attendance: 100; Referee: Joe Woolmer

22 December 2025	Ipswich Town	3–0	Charlton Athletic	Ipswich
19:00 GMT	Pitts 4'; Baggott 17'; Humphreys 71'	Report		Stadium: Portman Road; Attendance: 245; Referee: Jason Richardson

12 January 2026	Preston North End	0–3	Ipswich Town	Chorley
19:00 GMT		Report	Mauge 19', 82'; Ayinde 34'	Stadium: Victory Park; Attendance: 125; Referee: Gareth Thomas
Note: Match was originally going to be played 15 December 2025 but was postponed due to a frozen pitch.

=== Group D ===
Team	Pld	W	D	L	GF	GA	GD	Pts
Watford (A)	6	3	1	2	12	10	+2	10
Blackburn Rovers (A)	6	2	2	2	10	8	+2	8
Leyton Orient (E)	6	2	2	2	11	12	−1	8
Coventry City (E)	6	1	3	2	7	10	−3	6

Updated to match(es) played on 14 January 2026. Source:
(A) Advance to a further round; (E) Eliminated

9 September 2025	Leyton Orient	3–2	Watford	Leyton
19:00 BST	Perkins 17' (pen.); Gordon 62'; Hambury 86'	Report	Okosun 51'; Nabizada 77' (pen.)	Stadium: Brisbane Road; Attendance: 164; Referee: Wayne Cartmel

10 September 2025	Coventry City	1–1	Blackburn Rovers	Leamington Spa
19:00 BST	Shepherd 4'	Report	Sergeant 90+2'	Stadium: New Windmill Ground; Attendance: 138; Referee: William Davis

8 October 2025	Blackburn Rovers	3–1	Leyton Orient	Leyland
19:00 BST	Doherty 27'; Boggan 54'; Powell 60'	Report	Sterling 44'	Stadium: County Ground; Attendance: 114; Referee: Aaron Jackson

17 October 2025	Watford	4–1	Coventry City	Kings Langley
19:00 BST	Massiah-Edwards 19'; Sanghrajka 35'; Vancea 56'; Nabizada 87'	Report	Dausch 45+1'	Stadium: Gaywood Park; Attendance: 148; Referee: Adam Merchant

5 November 2025	Leyton Orient	1–1	Blackburn Rovers	Leyton
19:00 GMT	Carter 90+4'	Report	Joseph 82'	Stadium: Brisbane Road; Attendance: 118; Referee: Lewis Sandoe

21 November 2025	Watford	2–1	Blackburn Rovers	Kings Langley
19:00 GMT	Okosun 45+7'; Massiah-Edwards 58'	Report	Powell 65'	Stadium: Gaywood Park; Attendance: 115; Referee: Ross Martin

25 November 2025	Leyton Orient	4–3	Coventry City	Leyton
19:00 GMT	Archibald 10'; Hambury 28'; Nzang 80'; Mohamud 89'	Report	Stidder 2'; Siddall 40'; Toluwaloju 48'	Stadium: Brisbane Road; Attendance: 120; Referee: Will Briers

3 December 2025	Watford	2–1	Leyton Orient	Kings Langley
19:00 GMT	Moulton 2', 90+9'	Report	Mohamud 75'	Stadium: Gaywood Park; Attendance: 92; Referee: Matthew Scholes

10 December 2025	Coventry City	0–0	Watford	Leamington Spa
19:00 GMT		Report		Stadium: New Windmill Ground; Attendance: 191; Referee: Harry Wager

16 December 2025	Blackburn Rovers	4–2	Watford	Leyland
19:00 GMT	Joseph 18', 50'; Doherty 43'; Farkas 90+1'	Report	Shevchenko 19', 25'	Stadium: County Ground; Referee: Declan Brown

7 January 2026	Blackburn Rovers	0–1	Coventry City	Leyland
19:00 GMT		Report	Finney 45+3'	Stadium: County Ground; Attendance: 120; Referee: William Davis
Note: Match was originally to be played 28 November 2025 but was postponed.

14 January 2026	Coventry City	1–1	Leyton Orient	Leamington Spa
19:00 GMT	Shepherd 54'	Report	O’Keefe 4'	Stadium: New Windmill Ground; Referee: Niall Smith
Note: match was originally going to be played on 18 December 2025 but was postponed due to a frozen pitch.

=== Group E ===
Team	Pld	W	D	L	GF	GA	GD	Pts
West Bromwich Albion (A)	6	4	1	1	13	10	+3	13
Brentford (A)	6	4	0	2	16	5	+11	12
Exeter City (E)	6	2	1	3	4	7	−3	7
Luton Town (E)	6	1	0	5	8	19	−11	3

Updated to match(es) played on 22 December 2025. Source:
(A) Advance to a further round; (E) Eliminated

26 August 2025	Exeter City	1–0	Luton Town	Exeter
19:00 BST	Wilson 74'	Report		Stadium: St James Park; Attendance: 335; Referee: Adrian Quelch

30 September 2025	Exeter City	1–0	Brentford	Exeter
19:00 BST	Woodhouse 84'	Report		Stadium: St James Park; Attendance: 247; Referee: Matthew Russell

15 October 2025	West Bromwich Albion	0–0	Exeter City	Perry Barr
19:00 BST		Report		Stadium: Alexander Stadium; Attendance: 107; Referee: Matthew Scholes

21 October 2025	Luton Town	1–6	Brentford	Luton
19:00 BST	Evans 6'	Report	Maghoma 30'; Carvalho 45+2', 77'; Donovan 47' (pen.); Peart-Harris 49' (pen.); Konak 55'	Stadium: Kenilworth Road; Attendance: 753; Referee: Tolu Sangowawa

18 November 2025	Luton Town	1–5	West Bromwich Albion	Luton
19:00 GMT	Brown 39'	Report	Nelson 20'; Parker 55'; Dupont 67'; Blackshield 90+1'; Francis-Caesar 90+5'	Stadium: Kenilworth Road; Attendance: 487; Referee: Callum Walchester

24 November 2025	Brentford	3–0	Exeter City	Staines-upon-Thames
19:00 GMT	Stephenson 62'; Pierre 78'; Boni 85'	Report		Stadium: Wheatsheaf Park; Referee: Matthew Norton

28 November 2025	West Bromwich Albion	1–0	Brentford	Perry Barr
19:00 GMT	Mandey 19'	Report		Stadium: Alexander Stadium; Attendance: 127; Referee: Paul Marsden

3 December 2025	Luton Town	2–1	Exeter City	Enfield
19:00 GMT	Trustram 25'; Odegah 45'	Report	Wilson 72'	Stadium: Queen Elizabeth II Stadium; Attendance: 110; Referee: Alan Dale

8 December 2025	Brentford	5–1	West Bromwich Albion	Staines-upon-Thames
19:00 GMT	Boni 37', 52'; Morgan 39', 45+3'; Pierre 79'	Report	Dupont 10'	Stadium: Wheatsheaf Park; Attendance: 250; Referee: Aji Ajibola

14 December 2025	Brentford	2–1	Luton Town	Staines-upon-Thames
13:00 GMT	Holland 4'; Grey 57'	Report	Odegah 56'	Stadium: Wheatsheaf Park; Attendance: 127; Referee: Stephen Parkinson

16 December 2025	Exeter City	1–2	West Bromwich Albion	Exeter
19:00 GMT	Williams 90+1'	Report	Mandey 19', 37'	Stadium: St James Park; Attendance: 244; Referee: Lewis Sandoe

22 December 2025	West Bromwich Albion	4–3	Luton Town	Perry Barr
19:00 GMT	Nelson 7'; Mandey 16', 79'; Parker 29'	Report	Lorentzen-Jones 10' (pen.); Fox 44'; Paternoster 89'	Stadium: Alexander Stadium; Attendance: 107; Referee: Scott Jackson

=== Group F ===
Team	Pld	W	D	L	GF	GA	GD	Pts
Burnley (A)	6	4	0	2	11	10	+1	12
Queens Park Rangers (A)	6	3	1	2	11	9	+2	10
Cardiff City (E)	6	2	1	3	15	12	+3	7
Stockport County (E)	6	2	0	4	11	17	−6	6

Updated to match(es) played on 4 March 2026. Source:
(A) Advance to a further round; (E) Eliminated

18 September 2025	Stockport County	1–3	Queens Park Rangers	Edgeley
19:00 BST	Whittingham 57'	Report	Coomes 35'; Alemayehu 53'; Oluwabusola 83'	Stadium: Edgeley Park; Attendance: 268; Referee: Steven Copeland

23 September 2025	Cardiff City	1–2	Burnley	Leckwith
19:00 BST	Barton 74'	Report	Veevers 67'; Ryan 86'	Stadium: Cardiff International Sports Campus; Attendance: 100; Referee: Ross Martin

17 October 2025	Burnley	3–2	Stockport County	Leyland
19:00 BST	Veevers 9'; McEvilly 30'; Clark 90+2'	Report	Nino 55'; Maher 85'	Stadium: County Ground; Attendance: 113; Referee: Callum Jones

24 October 2025	Queens Park Rangers	2–2	Cardiff City	Perivale
19:00 BST	Logan 16'; Bennie 17'	Report	Mafico 51'; Perrett 62' (pen.)	Stadium: Reynolds Field; Referee: Chay Hathway

20 November 2025	Burnley	1–3	Queens Park Rangers	Leyland
19:00 GMT	Wetshi 28'	Report	Hassan 31' (pen.); Pearman 47'; O'Brien 84'	Stadium: County Ground; Referee: Gareth Thomas

28 November 2025	Burnley	3–1	Cardiff City	Leyland
19:00 GMT	Bevan 17'; Banel 30'; Masara 65'	Report	Barton 28'	Stadium: County Ground; Attendance: 120; Referee: Liam Smith

28 November 2025	Queens Park Rangers	2–1	Stockport County	Perivale
19:00 GMT	Bennie 2', 90+6'	Report	Cina 61'	Stadium: Reynolds Field; Attendance: 150; Referee: Liam Smith

5 December 2025	Cardiff City	7–2	Stockport County	Leckwith
19:00 GMT	Twose 27', 45+1'; Perrett 34' (pen.), 58'; Apter 34'; George 73'; Barton 90+2'	Report	Astles 17'; Kingdon 29' (o.g.)	Stadium: Cardiff International Sports Campus; Attendance: 100; Referee: Niall Smith

12 December 2025	Cardiff City	3–1	Queens Park Rangers	Leckwith
19:00 GMT	Perrett 32' (pen.); Nyakuhwa 66'; Pearce 84'	Report	Alemayehu 87'	Stadium: Cardiff International Sports Campus; Attendance: 125; Referee: Dale Baines

19 December 2025	Queens Park Rangers	0–1	Burnley	Perivale
19:00 GMT		Report	Banel 32'	Stadium: Reynolds Field; Attendance: 73; Referee: Aji Ajibola

22 December 2025	Stockport County	2–1	Cardiff City	Radcliffe
19:00 GMT	Astles 56', 85'	Report	Perrett 80' (pen.)	Stadium: Stainton Park; Attendance: 102; Referee: Greg Rollason

4 March 2026	Stockport County	3–1	Burnley	Stalybridge
19:00 GMT	Kouam 76'; Cina 88'; Watson 90'	Report	Morley 36'	Stadium: Bower Fold; Attendance: 149; Referee: Richard Aspinall
Note: Match was originally going to be played 15 December 2025 but was postponed due to a frozen pitch, then was going to be played on 6 January 2026 but was postponed again to yet another frozen pitch, then was postponed a third time due to a waterlogged pitch on 27 January 2026.

=== Group G ===
Team	Pld	W	D	L	GF	GA	GD	Pts
Nottingham Forest (A)	6	5	1	0	10	3	+7	16
Swansea City (A)	6	3	1	2	14	9	+5	10
Wolverhampton Wanderers (E)	6	2	1	3	9	11	−2	7
Millwall (E)	6	0	1	5	7	17	−10	1

Updated to match(es) played on 23 January 2026. Source:
(A) Advance to a further round; (E) Eliminated

26 September 2025	Millwall	1–1	Wolverhampton Wanderers	Bermondsey
19:00 BST	Baker 88'	Report	Ángel 45+5'	Stadium: The Den; Attendance: 20; Referee: Paul Johnson

20 October 2025	Wolverhampton Wanderers	2–4	Swansea City	Kidderminster
19:00 BST	Holman 24'; Sutherland 82'	Report	Griffith 3'; Woodward 65'; McKenzie 78'; Wales 80'	Stadium: Aggborough Stadium; Attendance: 202; Referee: Gareth Thomas

21 November 2025	Nottingham Forest	1–0	Wolverhampton Wanderers	Loughborough
19:00 GMT	Sillah 39'	Report		Stadium: Loughborough University Stadium; Attendance: 133; Referee: Chay Hathway

21 November 2025	Swansea City	2–1	Millwall	Landore
19:00 GMT	Demery 19'; Bates 32' (pen.)	Report	Howland 35'	Stadium: Landore Training Centre; Attendance: 91; Referee: Jason Richardson

28 November 2025	Nottingham Forest	1–0	Swansea City	Loughborough
19:00 GMT	Anisjko 90'	Report		Stadium: Loughborough University Stadium; Attendance: 86; Referee: Scott Jackson

8 December 2025	Wolverhampton Wanderers	3–2	Millwall	Kidderminster
19:00 GMT	Holman 9', 48'; Olagunju 22'	Report	Celestine-Charles 54' (pen.); Redhead 75'	Stadium: Aggborough Stadium; Attendance: 122; Referee: Gareth Thomas

12 December 2025	Nottingham Forest	2–1	Millwall	Loughborough
19:00 GMT	Berry 29', 34'	Report	Celestine-Charles 74'	Stadium: Loughborough University Stadium; Attendance: 79; Referee: Robert Claussen

13 December 2025	Swansea City	2–3	Wolverhampton Wanderers	Landore
15:30 GMT	Woodward 48'; Bates 69'	Report	Ángel 1'; Rawlings 81'; Voice 90+1'	Stadium: Landore Training Centre; Attendance: 69; Referee: Rob Massey-Ellis

16 December 2025	Millwall	1–4	Nottingham Forest	Bermondsey
19:00 GMT	Redhead 40' (pen.)	Report	Thompson; Sinclair; Berry 38'; Blake 47'	Stadium: The Den; Attendance: 55; Referee: Sam Mulhall

20 December 2025	Millwall	1–5	Swansea City	Bermondsey
13:00 GMT	Redhead 44'	Report	Pescatore 34', 47'; Demery 40'; Woodward 90+3'; McKenzie 90+5'	Stadium: The Den; Attendance: 67; Referee: Wayne Cartmel

22 December 2025	Wolverhampton Wanderers	0–1	Nottingham Forest	Kidderminster
19:00 GMT		Report	McClure 67'	Stadium: Aggborough Stadium; Attendance: 272; Referee: Aaron Jackson

23 January 2026	Swansea City	1–1	Nottingham Forest	Landore
12:00 GMT	Jones 66'	Report	Anisjko 38'	Stadium: Landore Training Centre; Attendance: 66; Referee: Richard Aspinall
Note: Match was originally going to be played 7 December 2025 but was postponed due to a frozen pitch.

=== Group H ===
Team	Pld	W	D	L	GF	GA	GD	Pts
Colchester United (A)	6	3	1	2	15	12	+3	10
Sunderland (A)	6	3	1	2	13	10	+3	10
Bromley (E)	6	3	0	3	7	11	−4	9
Norwich City (E)	6	1	2	3	10	12	−2	5

Updated to match(es) played on 22 December 2025. Source:
(A) Advance to a further round; (E) Eliminated

8 September 2025	Bromley	2–1	Sunderland	Bromley
19:00 BST	Stepien-Iwumene 11'; German 53'	Report	Whittaker 56'	Stadium: Hayes Lane; Attendance: 308; Referee: Adrian Quelch

12 September 2025	Norwich City	2–2	Colchester United	Colney
19:00 BST	Jones 10'; Bridge 25'	Report	Connolly 49' (pen.); Wood 54'	Stadium: Colney Training Centre; Attendance: 53; Referee: Abigail Byrne

10 October 2025	Sunderland	3–2	Norwich City	Hetton-le-Hole
19:00 BST	Nield 9'; Proctor 90'; Neill 90+8'	Report	Jones 20'; Welch 71'	Stadium: Eppleton Colliery Welfare Ground; Attendance: 300; Referee: Paul Howard

17 October 2025	Sunderland	2–1	Colchester United	Hetton-le-Hole
19:00 BST	Abdullahi 40', 65'	Report	Martin 79'	Stadium: Eppleton Colliery Welfare Ground; Attendance: 255; Referee: Kavan Hurn

27 October 2025	Colchester United	2–0	Bromley	Colchester
19:00 GMT	Evans 57'; Emery 73'	Report		Stadium: Colchester Community Stadium; Attendance: 221; Referee: Kai Morgan

17 November 2025	Bromley	2–1	Norwich City	Bromley
19:00 GMT	Dinanga 17'; Adelusi 34' (o.g.)	Report	Adelusi 30'	Stadium: Hayes Lane; Attendance: 246; Referee: Harry Wager

1 December 2025	Sunderland	4–0	Bromley	Hetton-le-Hole
19:00 GMT	Tutierov 47'; Jones 57'; Waters 62', 90+4'	Report		Stadium: Eppleton Colliery Welfare Ground; Attendance: 220; Referee: Aaron Jackson

2 December 2025	Colchester United	3–4	Norwich City	Colchester
19:00 GMT	Lisbie 12'; Oni 19'; Evans 80'	Report	Welch 49'; Chilvers 52', 72'; Trialist 53' (o.g.)	Stadium: Colchester Community Stadium; Attendance: 106; Referee: Richard Aspinall

12 December 2025	Norwich City	1–1	Sunderland	Colney
19:00 GMT	Bracking 90+1'	Report	Whittaker 53'	Stadium: Colney Training Centre; Attendance: 53; Referee: Oliver Mackey

15 December 2025	Bromley	2–3	Colchester United	Bromley
19:00 GMT	Taylor 1'; Hards 51'	Report	Lisbie 66'; Evans 72'; Newby 90+6'	Stadium: Hayes Lane; Attendance: 143; Referee: Matthew Russell

19 December 2025	Norwich City	0–1	Bromley	Colney
19:00 GMT		Report	Dinanga 3'	Stadium: Colney Training Centre; Attendance: 64; Referee: Callum Walchester

22 December 2025	Colchester United	4–2	Sunderland	Colchester
19:00 GMT	Newby 15'; Akande 28', 83'; Connolly 58'	Report	Proctor 29'; Jones 41'	Stadium: Colchester Community Stadium; Attendance: 210; Referee: Daniel Blades

== Knockout stages ==
=== Round of 16 ===
The Round of 16 included all 8 group winners and runners up.

27 January 2026	Sheffield United	1–2	AFC Bournemouth	York
19:00 GMT	Reid 84'	Report	Nyarko 12', 79'	Stadium: York Community Stadium; Attendance: 54; Referee: Andrew Miller

3 February 2026	Colchester United	1–0	Swansea City	Colchester
19:00 GMT	Edwards 68'	Report		Stadium: Colchester Community Stadium; Attendance: 173; Referee: George Laflin

4 February 2026	Reading	5–0	Stoke City	Farnborough
19:00 GMT	Camará 1'; Osho 18'; Coke-Miles-Smith 32'; 70' (o.g.); Duah 79'	Report		Stadium: Cherrywood Road; Attendance: 207; Referee: Robert Massey-Ellis

9 February 2026	Burnley	3–2	Brentford	Leyland
19:00 GMT	McMahon-Brown 25', 39', 53'	Report	Pierre 45+2'; Boni 84'	Stadium: Lancashire FA County Ground; Attendance: 62; Referee: Stuart Morland

9 February 2026	Watford	3–2	Charlton Athletic	Kings Langley
19:00 GMT	Nabizada 64'; Lawson 89' (pen.); Akinyimika 90+2'	Report	Dixon 72'; Mitchell 81'	Stadium: Gaywood Park; Attendance: 53; Referee: Ross Martin

11 February 2026	West Bromwich Albion	1–0	Queens Park Rangers	Perry Barr
19:00 GMT	McNeil 6'	Report		Stadium: Alexander Stadium; Attendance: 74; Referee: Callum Walchester

11 February 2026	Nottingham Forest	1–6	Sunderland	Loughborough
19:00 GMT	Moreira 22'	Report	Scott 26'; Whittaker 30'; Geragusian 50'; Proctor 55'; Hanks 61' (o.g.); Neill 79'	Stadium: Loughborough University Stadium; Attendance: 45; Referee: Kavan Hurn

17 February 2026	Ipswich Town	2–3 (a.e.t.)	Blackburn Rovers	Ipswich
19:00 GMT	Lewis 4'; Fletcher 32'	Report	Kamara 45+1', 49'; Doherty 115'	Stadium: Portman Road; Attendance: 808; Referee: Jason Richardson

=== Quarter-finals ===
The Quarter-finals included the 8 winners from the previous round.

5 March 2026	Burnley	5–2	Colchester United	Leyland
19:00 GMT	Masara 25'; Clark 68'; Okonkwo 70', 88', 90+5'	Report	Connolly 44' (pen.); Evans 54'	Stadium: County Ground; Attendance: 200; Referee: Declan Brown

6 March 2026	Sunderland	3–1	Watford	Hetton-le-Hole
19:00 GMT	Geragusian 52'; Campbell 75', 83'		Smith 90+6'	Stadium: Eppleton Colliery Welfare Ground; Attendance: 149; Referee: Gareth Thomas

25 March 2026	Blackburn Rovers	3–1	Reading	Accrington
20:00 GMT	Joseph 29' (pen.); Tyjon 51', 79'	Report	Duah 87'	Stadium: Crown Ground; Attendance: 87; Referee: William Davis

27 March 2026	AFC Bournemouth	4–5	West Bromwich Albion	Bournemouth
20:00 GMT	Mottoh 9'; Gonzalez 23'; Rees-Dottin 68'; Nyarko 90+1'	Report	Shaw 25'; Sule 44', 46', 54'; DuPont 80'	Stadium: Dean Court; Attendance: 140; Referee: Sunny Sukhvir Gill

=== Semi-finals ===
The Semi-finals included the four winners from the Previous Round.

13 April 2026	Burnley	2–1	West Bromwich Albion	Burnley
20:00 GMT	Clark 53'; Masara 70'	Report	Maughan 76'	Stadium: Turf Moor; Attendance: 261; Referee: Dale Baines

15 April 2026	Sunderland	4–2	Blackburn Rovers	Sunderland
19:00 GMT	Whittaker 13', 75'; Jones 20'; Jones 37'	Report	Boggan 3'; Powell 26'	Stadium: Stadium of Light; Attendance: 309; Referee: Richard Aspinall

=== Final ===
14 May 2026
19:00 GMT

Sunderland	1–2	Burnley
Scott 73'	Report	Clark 45'; McMahon–Brown 50'

Stadium of Light, Sunderland
Attendance: 2,385
Referee: Michael Barlow

Note: Flags indicate national team as defined under FIFA eligibility rules; some limited exceptions apply. Players may hold more than one non-FIFA nationality.

Sunderland
No.	Pos.	Nation	Player
1	GK	ENG	Joseph Cowan
2	DF	ENG	Archie Lightfoot
3	DF	ENG	Finlay Holcroft
4	DF	ENG	Jenson Jones
5	DF	ENG	Ben Kindon
6	MF	SRB	Milan Aleksić
7	MF	ENG	Charlie Dinsdale (substituted off) 65'
8	MF	ENG	Jaydon Jones (substituted off) 71'
9	FW	NGR	Ahmed Abdullahi (substituted off) 90'
10	MF	ENG	Harrison Jones
11	MF	ENG	Jack Whittaker
Substitutes:
12	GK	NIR	Ben Metcalf
13	MF	ENG	Alex Lienard
14	MF	ENG	Tom Proctor (substituted on) 65'
15	FW	AUS	Marcus Neill (substituted on) 90'
16	FW	ENG	Felix Scott (substituted on) 71'
Coach: (Scotland) Graeme Murty

Burnley
No.	Pos.	Nation	Player
1	GK	IRL	Oisin Cooney
2	DF	WAL	Connor Roberts (substituted off) 45'
3	MF	SCO	Oli Pimlott (substituted off) 87'
4	DF	SCO	Murray Campbell
5	DF	ENG	Logan Pye
6	MF	ENG	George Brierley
7	FW	ENG	Vernon Masara (substituted off) 90'
8	MF	SCO	Ellis Clark
9	MF	IRL	Kian McMahon-Brown
10	MF	ENG	Tommy McDermott (substituted off) 77'
11	FW	ENG	Brandon Pouani (substituted off) 66'
Substitutes:
14	DF	SCO	Cameron Scott (substituted on) 45'
15	DF	ENG	Roman Egan-Riley (substituted on) 90'
16	MF	NZL	Marley Leuluai
17	MF	ENG	Zach Johnson (substituted on) 77'
18	MF	WAL	Tom Tweedy (substituted on) 66'
Coach: (England) Andy Farrell
