= Kian McMahon-Brown =

Irish footballer (born 2008)

Personal information
- Full name: Kian McMahon-Brown
- Date of birth: 3 August 2008 (age 18)
- Place of birth: Kilcock, County Kildare, Ireland
- Height: 1.75 m (5 ft 9 in)
- Positions: Striker; attacking midfielder

Team information
- Current team: Shrewsbury Town (on loan from Burnley)
- Number: 18

Youth career
- 2021–2026: Burnley

Senior career*
| Years | Team | Apps | (Gls) |
| 2026– | Burnley | 0 | (0) |
| 2026– | → Shrewsbury Town (loan) | 10 | (2) |

International career^{‡}
| 2024–2025 | Republic of Ireland U17 | 21 | (1) |
| 2026– | Republic of Ireland U19 | 3 | (2) |
| 2026– | Republic of Ireland U21 | 3 | (0) |
- * Club domestic league appearances and goals as of 17:56, 9 November 2026 (UTC) ‡ National team caps and goals as of 21:21, 13 November 2026 (UTC)

Kian McMahon-Brown (born 3 August 2008) is an Irish professional footballer who plays as a striker or attacking midfielder for EFL League Two club Shrewsbury Town, on loan from EFL Championship club Burnley, and is a Republic of Ireland U21 international.

McMahon-Brown played youth football with Burnley from U14 level and would sign his first professional contract in 2026. After signing his first pro deal, McMahon-Brown was sent out on loan with Shrewsbury Town.

McMahon-Brown has played at multiple age groups for the Republic of Ireland, including representing them at the FIFA U-17 World Cup.

== Youth career ==
McMahon-Brown joined the Burnley academy at Under-14 level.

On 13 August 2025, McMahon-Brown scored for the Burnley U21s in the National League Cup against Rochdale. On 14 May 2026, McMahon-Brown scored in the final of the Premier League Cup as Burnley U21s defeated Sunderland U21s in the final.

== Club career ==
=== Burnley ===
On 3 March 2026, McMahon-Brown was included on the bench in a Premier League game against Everton at the Hill Dickinson Stadium.

On 10 July 2026, McMahon-Brown signed his first professional contract with EFL Championship club Burnley, which was a two-year deal with the club.

==== Shrewsbury Town (loan) ====
On 31 July 2026, McMahon-Brown joined EFL League Two club Shrewsbury Town on loan for the season. On 12 September, McMahon-Brown scored in only his third game for the club in a 2–0 win over Northampton Town.

== International career ==
McMahon-Brown has represented Ireland at multiple youth levels.

McMahon-Brown was part of the squad the qualified for and travelled to the 2025 FIFA U-17 World Cup. McMahon-Brown scored in Ireland's opening game in a 4–1 win over Panama. McMahon-Brown scored his penalty in Ireland's Penalty shoot-out against Canada as Ireland made it to the last 16.

On 20 March 2026, McMahon-Brown was called up to the Republic of Ireland U19s for the first time. During his first international window with the team he scored in games against Scotland and Italy.

== Personal life ==
McMahon-Brown's brother Frankie McMahon-Brown, is also a product of the Burnley academy and currently plays for National League North club Radcliffe.

== Career statistics ==
=== Club ===
As of match played 7 November 2026

Appearances and goals by club, season and competition
| Club | Season | League | | | National cup (Note: Includes FA Cup) | | League cup (Note: Includes EFL Cup) | | Other | | Total | |
| Club | Season | Division | Apps | Goals | Apps | Goals | Apps | Goals | Apps | Goals | Apps | Goals |
|---|---|---|---|---|---|---|---|---|---|---|---|---|
| Burnley U21 | 2025–26 | — | | | — | | — | | 3 (Note: Appearances in National League Cup) | 1 | 3 | 1 |
| Burnley | 2025–26 | Premier League | 0 | 0 | 0 | 0 | 0 | 0 | 0 | 0 | 0 | 0 |
| Burnley | 2026–27 | Championship | 0 | 0 | 0 | 0 | 0 | 0 | 0 | 0 | 0 | 0 |
| Burnley | Total | | 0 | 0 | 0 | 0 | 0 | 0 | 0 | 0 | 0 | 0 |
| Shrewsbury Town (loan) | 2026–27 | League Two | 10 | 2 | 1 | 0 | 0 | 0 | 0 | 0 | 11 | 2 |
| Career total | | | 10 | 2 | 1 | 0 | 0 | 0 | 3 | 1 | 14 | 3 |
