= Zach Giggs =

Welsh association football player

Personal information
- Full name: Zachary Joseph Giggs
- Date of birth: 1 October 2006 (age 20)
- Place of birth: Manchester, England
- Position: Defender

Team information
- Current team: Sheffield United

Youth career
- –2023: Manchester United
- 2023–: Sheffield United

Senior career*
Years	Team	Apps	(Gls)
2023–	Sheffield United	0	(0)

International career
2025–	Wales U19	2	(0)
- * Club domestic league appearances and goals as of 00:15 (UTC)

Zachary Joseph Giggs (born 1 October 2006) is a Welsh footballer who plays for EFL Championship club Sheffield United. He is the son of Ryan Giggs.

== Club career ==
Giggs was in the youth academy of Manchester United until he was 16 years-old. Giggs signed for Sheffield United in May 2023, following a brief trial.

== International career ==
Eligible to play for England or Wales, Giggs has represented Wales at youth level. He was first called up to a Wales age-group side in May 2021.

== Style of play ==
Giggs has played at full-back or wing-back and can play on either flank. He has also played in central defence. He was named by English newspaper The Guardian as one of the best first year scholars in the Premier League in October 2023.

== Personal life ==
The son of Stacey Cooke and Ryan Giggs, his parents divorced in 2017. His father was also a professional footballer, holding the appearance record for Manchester United and is the most decorated Premier League footballer of all time. His grandfather is former rugby union and Wales international rugby league footballer Danny Wilson.
