= Ryan Giggs =

Welsh footballer (born 1973)

Ryan Giggs OBE
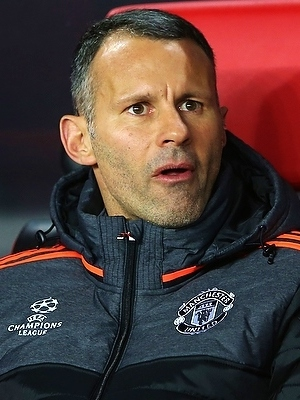
- Giggs with Manchester United in 2015

Personal information
- Full name: Ryan Joseph Giggs
- Birth name: Ryan Joseph Wilson
- Date of birth: 29 November 1973 (age 52)
- Place of birth: Canton, Cardiff, Wales
- Height: 5 ft 10 in (1.79 m)
- Positions: Left midfielder; left winger

Youth career
- Deans FC
- 1985–1987: Manchester City
- 1987–1990: Manchester United

Senior career*
Years	Team	Apps	(Gls)
1990–2014	Manchester United	672	(114)

International career
~	England Schools	9	(~)
1989	England U16	1	(1)
1989	Wales U18	3	(0)
1991	Wales U21	1	(0)
1991–2007	Wales	64	(12)
2012	Great Britain	4	(1)

Managerial career
- 2014: Manchester United (interim)
- 2014–2016: Manchester United (assistant)
- 2018–2022: Wales
- * Club domestic league appearances and goals

Ryan Joseph Giggs (né Wilson; born 29 November 1973) is a Welsh football coach, co-owner of Salford City, and former player who played as a left midfielder or winger. Regarded as one of the greatest players of his generation, Giggs spent his entire professional career at Manchester United, where he also served as the club's interim player-manager and assistant manager. He is one of the most decorated footballers of all time, and is one of only 67 players to have made over 1,000 career appearances.

The son of rugby union and Wales international rugby league footballer Danny Wilson, Giggs was born in Cardiff but moved to Manchester at the age of six when his father joined Swinton RLFC. Predominantly a left midfielder, he began his career with Manchester City, but joined Manchester United on his 14th birthday in 1987. He made his professional debut for the club in 1991 and spent the next 23 years in the first team. He retired from playing with the end of the 2013–14 season, holding the club record for competitive appearances – 963. Towards the end of the 2013–14 season, he became the club's interim player-manager following the sacking of David Moyes. He was assistant manager under Moyes' permanent replacement, Louis van Gaal. Giggs left United in July 2016, following the appointment of José Mourinho. During his time at United he won 13 Premier League titles – more than any other player in history, four FA Cups, three League Cups, two UEFA Champions League titles, a FIFA Club World Cup, an Intercontinental Cup, a UEFA Super Cup and nine FA Community Shields.

At international level, Giggs played for the Wales national team 64 times between 1991 and 2007, and captained the Great Britain team that competed at the 2012 Summer Olympics. He also represented his country in an uncapped international versus the Basque Country in May 2006 in Bilbao. He became the new manager of the Wales national team in January 2018. Giggs led Wales to qualification for UEFA Euro 2020. He did not manage the team at the tournament however, which was delayed due to the COVID-19 pandemic, as he was arrested on suspicion of assault. His assistant manager Rob Page took charge in his absence. Giggs resigned in June 2022, and Page was named as his successor.

Giggs was the first player in history to win two consecutive PFA Young Player of the Year awards (1992 and 1993), though he did not win the PFA Player of the Year award until 2009. He was the only player to play in each of the first 22 seasons of the Premier League, as well as the only player to score in each of the first 21 seasons. He was elected into the PFA Team of the Century in 2007, the Premier League Team of the Decade in 2003, and the FA Cup Team of the Century. He holds the record for the most assists in Premier League history, with 162, and the most assists in UEFA Champions League history with 41. He was named as BBC Sports Personality of the Year in 2009, and was appointed an Officer of the Order of the British Empire (OBE) in the 2007 Birthday Honours for his services to football.

== Early years ==
Giggs was born at St David's Hospital in Canton, Cardiff, to Danny Wilson, a rugby union player for Cardiff RFC, and Lynne Giggs (now Lynne Johnson). Giggs is mixed race – his paternal grandfather is a Sierra Leone Creole – and has spoken of the racism he faced as a child. As a child, Giggs grew up in Ely, a suburb of western Cardiff. His younger brother, Rhodri, is a former manager of EFL League Two club Salford City.

He spent much time with his mother's parents and playing football and rugby league on the roads outside their house in Pentrebane. In 1980, when Giggs was six years old, his father switched from rugby union to rugby league, and signed for Swinton RLFC, forcing the whole family to move north to Swinton, a town in Salford, Greater Manchester. The move was a traumatic one, as Giggs was very close to his grandparents in Cardiff, but he would often return there with his family at weekends or on school holidays.

After moving to Salford, Giggs appeared for the local team, Deans FC, who were coached by Manchester City scout Dennis Schofield. Schofield recommended Giggs to Manchester City, and he was signed up to their School of Excellence. Meanwhile, Giggs continued to play for Salford Boys, who went on to reach the final of the Granada Schools Cup competition at Anfield in 1987. Giggs captained the Salford team to victory over their Blackburn counterparts, was man of the match, and the trophy was presented to him by Liverpool chief scout Ron Yeats. Giggs also played rugby league at schoolboy level.

While playing for Deans, Giggs was observed regularly by local newsagent and Old Trafford steward Harold Wood. Wood spoke personally to Alex Ferguson who sent a scout, and Giggs was eventually offered a trial over the 1986 Christmas period. Giggs played in a match for Salford Boys against a United Under-15s side at The Cliff and scored a hat-trick, with Ferguson watching from his office window. On 29 November 1987 (his 14th birthday), Ferguson turned up at Giggs' house with United scout Joe Brown and offered him two years on associate schoolboy forms. They offered to waive YTS forms and persuaded Giggs to sign by offering the opportunity to turn professional in three years. Using the name Ryan Wilson, Giggs captained England at schoolboy level, playing at Wembley Stadium against Germany in 1989. He changed his surname to that of his mother at the age of 16, when his mother remarried, two years after his parents' separation.

== Manchester United ==
=== 1990–1995: Debut and early career ===
Giggs was offered his first professional contract on 29 November 1990 (his 17th birthday). He accepted the contract and became a professional two days later (1 December 1990).

At this time, United had recently won the FA Cup – their first major trophy since the appointment of Alex Ferguson as manager in November 1986. After two seasons in the league where they had finished mid-table, they were finally starting to threaten the dominance of Liverpool and Arsenal, though they only managed to finish sixth that season. Ferguson's quest for a successful left-winger had not been an easy one since the departure of Jesper Olsen two years earlier; he had initially signed Ralph Milne, but the player was not a success at United and lasted just one season in the first team before Ferguson secured the Southampton winger Danny Wallace in September 1989. Wallace had failed to shine at Old Trafford, and by the time Giggs turned professional Wallace was contending with 19-year-old Lee Sharpe for the role of first-choice left winger.

Giggs made his League debut against Everton at Old Trafford on 2 March 1991, as a substitute for the injured full-back Denis Irwin in a 2–0 defeat. In his first full start, Giggs was credited with his first-ever goal in a 1–0 win in the Manchester derby on 4 May 1991, though it appeared to be a Colin Hendry own goal. However, he was not included in the squad of 16 that defeated Barcelona in the UEFA Cup Winners' Cup final 11 days later. Lee Sharpe, who had won the race to displace Danny Wallace, took to the field as United's left winger, while Wallace was selected as a substitute. Giggs became a first-team regular early in the 1991–92 season, yet remained active with the youth system and captained the team, made up of many of "Fergie's Fledglings", to an FA Youth Cup triumph in 1992.

Giggs paved the way as the first of many Manchester United youth players to rise into the first team under Ferguson but as the youngest member of the United first-team squad, Giggs looked to the older players such as Bryan Robson for advice. Robson recommended that Giggs sign up with Harry Swales, the agent that he himself had inherited from Kevin Keegan.

That season, Giggs played in the team that finished as runners-up to Leeds United in the final year of the old First Division before the advent of the Premier League. United had led the table for much of the season before a run of dismal results in April saw them overtaken by the West Yorkshire side. Giggs collected his first piece of silverware on 12 April 1992 as United defeated Nottingham Forest in the League Cup Final after Giggs had set up Brian McClair to score the only goal of the game. In the semi-final he had scored the winning goal against Middlesbrough. At the end of the season, he was voted PFA Young Player of the Year – the award which had been credited to his colleague Lee Sharpe a year earlier.

By the start of the 1992–93 season, the first season of the newly formed Premier League, Giggs had ousted Sharpe to become United's first-choice left-winger. He was recognised as one of English football's two best emerging young wingers, alongside Steve McManaman, who were notable for being a throwback to the Stanley Matthews era of the 1950s winger. Giggs helped United to their first top-division title win for 26 years.

His emergence and the arrival of Eric Cantona heralded the dominance of United in the Premier League. Ferguson was protective of him, refusing to allow Giggs to be interviewed until he turned 20, eventually granting the first interview to the BBC's Des Lynam for Match of the Day in the 1993–94 season. United won the double that season, and Giggs was one of their key players alongside the likes of Cantona, Paul Ince and Mark Hughes. Giggs also played for United in the Football League Cup final, where they lost 3–1 to Aston Villa.

Off the pitch, newspapers claimed Giggs had "single-handedly revolutionised football's image" when he appeared as a teenager "with pace to burn, a bramble patch of black hair bouncing around his puppy popstar face, and a dazzling, gluey relationship between his impossibly fleet left foot and a football." As a result of this, he was afforded many opportunities not normally offered to footballers at his young age, such as hosting his television show, Ryan Giggs' Soccer Skills, which aired in 1994, and also had a book based on the series. Giggs was part of the Premier League's attempt to market itself globally, and he featured on countless football and lad mag covers, becoming a household name and fuelling the era where footballers started to become celebrity idols on a par with pop stars, in and around the mid to late 1990s. Despite his aversion to attention, Giggs also became a teenage pin-up and was once described as the "Premiership's First Poster Boy", and the "boy wonder". He was hailed as the first football star to capture the public imagination in a way unseen since the days of George Best; the irony was that Best and Bobby Charlton used to describe Giggs as their favourite young player, turning up at The Cliff training ground just to watch him. Best once quipped, "One day they might even say that I was another Ryan Giggs."

At the end of the 1993–94 season, Giggs won a second title in a row, and became the first player in history to win two consecutive PFA Young Player of the Year awards, a feat equalled by Robbie Fowler, Wayne Rooney and Dele Alli.

Giggs proved to be a scorer of great goals, with many of them being shortlisted for various Goal of the Season awards. Widely regarded as among his best were those against Queens Park Rangers in 1994, Tottenham in 1994, Everton in 1995, Coventry in 1996, and his solo effort against Arsenal in the replay of the 1999 FA Cup semi-final. During extra time, Giggs picked up possession after Patrick Vieira gave the ball away, then ran from his own half, dribbled past the whole Arsenal back line, including Tony Adams, Lee Dixon and Martin Keown before launching his left-footed strike just under David Seaman's bar and beyond his reach. He famously whipped off his shirt during his goal celebration as he ran over to his teammates. It also has the distinction of being the last ever goal scored in an FA Cup semi-final replay as, from the following season, the FA Cup semi-finals are decided in a single game, with extra time and a penalty shootout if required.

=== 1995–2000 ===
1994–95 saw Giggs restricted through injury to 29 Premier League games and only 1 goal. Later in the season, he recovered his form and fitness, though it was too late to help United to any major trophies. A failure to beat West Ham United on the final day of the season saw them lose the Premier League title to Blackburn Rovers. A week later, Giggs came on as a substitute in the FA Cup final against Everton, but United lost 1–0.

On a more positive side in the 1994–95 season, Giggs did get on the scoresheet twice in the opening Champions League game against IFK Göteborg (a 4–2 win, although United ultimately failed to progress to the quarter-finals) and also managed a goal in the FA Cup fourth-round victory over Wrexham, meaning that he had managed four goals in all competitions that season.

In 1995–96, Giggs returned to full form and played a vital part in United's unique second double, with his goal against Everton at Goodison Park on 9 September 1995 being shortlisted for the "goal of the season" award, though it was eventually beaten by a goal by Manchester City's Georgi Kinkladze. In November that season, Giggs scored two goals in a Premier League match against Southampton, where United won 4–1 to keep up the pressure on a Newcastle United side who actually went ten points clear on 23 December but were finally overhauled by United in mid-March. Giggs was also in the side for United's FA Cup final win over Liverpool on 11 May 1996, though Eric Cantona scored the only goal of the game. By now, Giggs had several new key colleagues in youngsters Gary Neville, Phil Neville, Nicky Butt, David Beckham and Paul Scholes. Beckham took over from Andrei Kanchelskis on the right-wing and Butt succeeded Paul Ince in central midfield to complete a new look United midfield along with Giggs and Roy Keane.

The following season, Giggs had his first real chance to shine in Europe. Having played a key role in United winning their third league title in four seasons, he helped them reach the UEFA Champions League semi-finals, the first United side in 28 years to achieve this. However, their hopes of European glory were ended by Borussia Dortmund, who edged them out by winning each leg of the semi-final 1–0. At the end of this season, Juventus' Alessandro Del Piero told Italian media that Giggs was one of his two favourite players.

In 1997–98, United were pipped to the Premier League title by Arsenal, following a dismal run of form in March and early April, leaving them without a trophy for only the second time since 1989. The following season, Giggs missed a lot of games through injury, but when he was fit his form was excellent and he played in both of United's cup finals that season. Memorable moments were his extra-time goal in the FA Cup semi-final against arch-rivals Arsenal giving United a 2–1 win, and his 90th-minute equaliser in the home leg of the UEFA Champions League semi-final against Juventus.

The highpoint in the 1998–99 season was when Giggs set up the equalising goal scored by Teddy Sheringham in the 1999 UEFA Champions League Final that set United on their way to the Treble.

Giggs was also the Man of the Match as United beat Palmeiras 1–0 to claim the Intercontinental Cup later that year.

=== 2000–2005 ===
Giggs became United's longest-serving player when Denis Irwin left in May 2002, and he became a pivotal part of the club, despite still being in his 20s. Giggs continued to excel in the four years that followed the Treble triumph of 1999. United were Premier League champions in three of the four seasons following the treble, as well as reaching the UEFA Champions League quarter-finals three times and the semi-finals once. In April 2001, he signed a new five-year contract.

Giggs celebrated his 10-year anniversary at Old Trafford with a testimonial match against Celtic at the start of the 2001–02 campaign, losing 4–3 in a game featuring a cameo by Eric Cantona. However, this was one of the most disappointing seasons United had endured since Giggs made his debut, as a dismal run of form in early winter ultimately cost them the league title and they were surprisingly knocked out of the Champions League on away goals in the semi-finals by German underdogs Bayer Leverkusen. A year later, on 23 August 2002, he bagged his 100th career goal in a draw with Chelsea at Stamford Bridge.

The 2002–03 season was one to forget for Giggs. He was forced to defend his poor form, insisting that he was not finished. This dip in form included being booed off the pitch in the 74th minute of a 1–1 semi-final first leg draw at home to Blackburn Rovers in the League Cup on 7 January and an open-goal miss during a 2–0 defeat against Arsenal in the FA Cup on 16 February that was described as the worst of his career, and prompted chants by the Arsenal fans of "Give it to Giggsy." A week later, on 24 February, Manchester United chief executive Peter Kenyon refused to rule out the possibility of Giggs leaving Old Trafford, saying: "It's too soon to say whether we would even consider a bid, and all we want to do at the moment is concentrate on this season." It was further claimed that a rift in the dressing room was contributing towards Giggs' possible departure. However, the following day, Giggs played one of his most memorable games, in a 3–0 victory against Juventus. After coming on as a substitute for Diego Forlán in the eighth minute, Giggs scored twice, including a goal that would later be heralded as one of his greatest goals and one of his finest Champions League moments.

After speculation throughout the season that Giggs was close to joining Italian club Inter Milan, possibly with Brazilian striker Adriano as a makeweight, Giggs quashed the rumours by saying he was happy at United.

He played in his fourth FA Cup triumph on 22 May 2004, making him one of only two players (the other being Roy Keane) to have won the trophy four times while playing for Manchester United. He has also finished with a runners-up medal three times (1995, 2005 and 2007). His participation in the victory over Liverpool in September 2004 made him the third player to play 600 games for United, alongside Bobby Charlton and Bill Foulkes. He was inducted into the English Football Hall of Fame in 2005 in recognition of his contribution to the English game.

In 2005, Giggs' form had improved and was no longer suffering with the hamstring injuries which had plagued his career, which he attributed to taking up yoga.

=== 2005–2010 ===
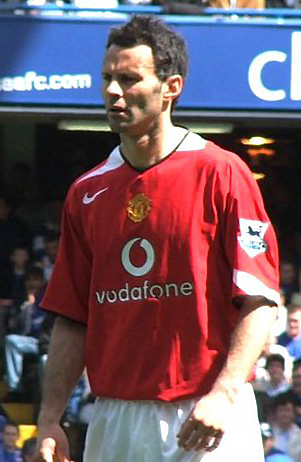
As his career progressed, Giggs abandoned his position on the left wing for a more central role.

Giggs signed a two-year contract extension with United when chief executive David Gill relented on his normal policy of not signing players over 30 to contracts longer than one year. Giggs benefited from being largely injury-free aside from a series of hamstring problems.

Giggs scored his first goal of the 2006–07 season in a 2–1 victory over Watford on 26 August 2006, with his goal proving to be the winner. Giggs scored the winner in United's next game, a 1–0 home victory over Tottenham Hotspur on 9 September, scoring a header in the eighth minute. Giggs provided a goal and an assist in the final Champions League group game against Benfica on 6 December, with his free-kick being converted by Nemanja Vidić before Giggs headed in a Cristiano Ronaldo cross.

In February 2007, Giggs scored the final three goals of his season. He scored the final goal in a 4–0 away win against Tottenham on 4 February which put United six points clear of Chelsea. On 20 February, Giggs scored the winning goal against Lille in the UEFA Champions League with a quickly taken free-kick that caused the Lille players to walk off the pitch in protest. Giggs later said he was amazed by the situation, as no rule had been broken. On 24 February, Giggs scored the equalising goal against Fulham in a game which United went on to win via a late Cristiano Ronaldo winner to go nine points clear of Chelsea.

On 6 May 2007, with Chelsea only able to manage a 1–1 draw with London rivals Arsenal, Manchester United became the champions of England. In doing so, Giggs set a new record of nine league titles, beating the previous record of eight he shared with Alan Hansen and Phil Neal (who won all of their titles with Liverpool). In the 2007 FA Cup Final, Giggs had a goal ruled out in the 14th minute of extra time after referee Steve Bennett deemed him to have fouled goalkeeper Petr Čech in forcing the ball across the line.

Giggs played a starring role in United's 2007 FA Community Shield victory after netting in the first half to bring the game to a 1–1 draw, which led to penalty triumph for the Red Devils after 'keeper Edwin van der Sar saved all of Chelsea's first three penalties; the goal was Giggs' first professional goal at Wembley Stadium.

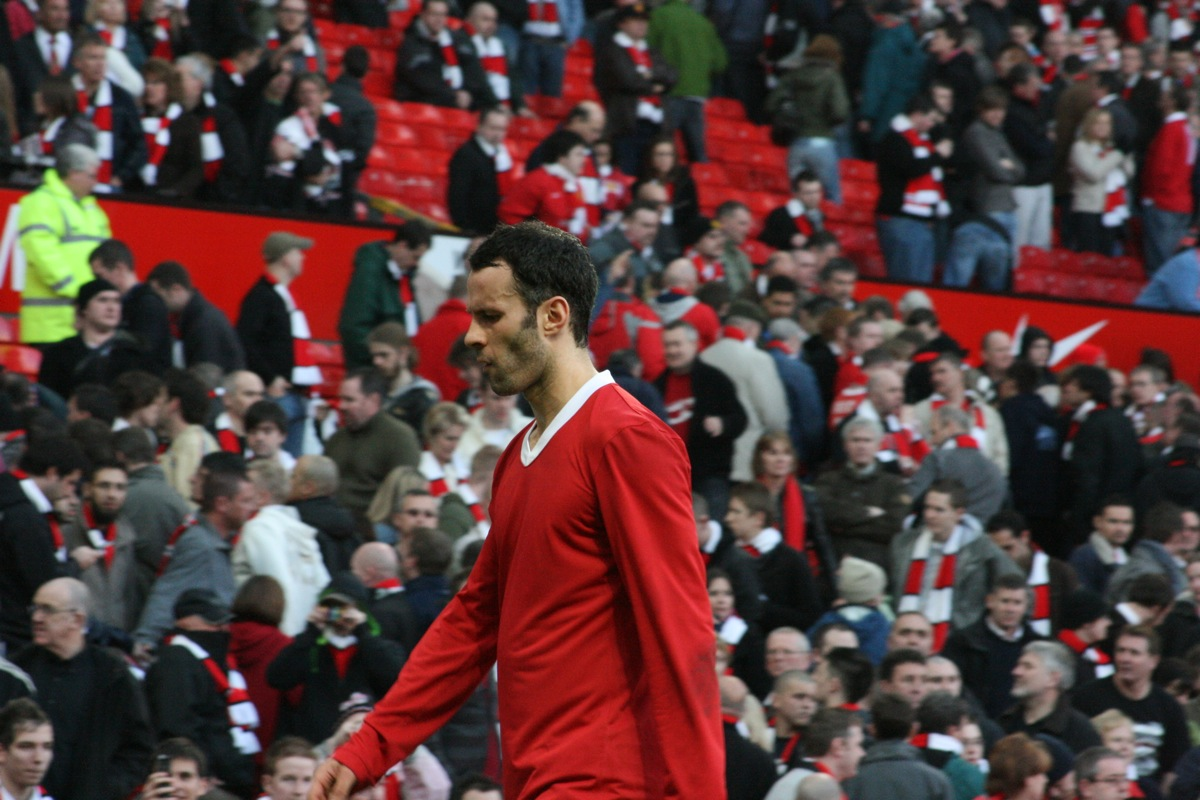
Seen here after the Munich air disaster 50th anniversary match against Manchester City in February 2008, Giggs has made more appearances in the Manchester derby than any other player.

In the 2007–08 season, Alex Ferguson adopted a rotation system between Giggs and newcomers Nani and Anderson. Giggs scored his 100th league goal for United against Derby County on 8 December 2007, which United won 4–1. More landmarks have been achieved: on 20 February 2008 he made his 100th appearance in the UEFA Champions League in a game against Lyon and on 11 May 2008, he came on as a substitute for Park Ji-sung to equal Bobby Charlton's record of 758 appearances for United. Giggs scored the second goal in that match, sealing his, and United's, 10th Premier League title. Ten days later, on 21 May 2008, Giggs broke Bobby Charlton's appearance record for United when coming on as an 87th-minute substitute for Paul Scholes in the UEFA Champions League Final against Chelsea. United won the final, defeating Chelsea 6–5 on penalties after a 1–1 draw after extra time, with Giggs converting the winning penalty in sudden death.

At the start of Manchester United's 2008–09 campaign, Alex Ferguson began placing Giggs at central midfield, behind the forwards, instead of his favoured wing position. Alex Ferguson said in an interview, "(Giggs) is a very valuable player, he will be 35 this November but at 35, he can be United's key player. At 25, Ryan would shatter defenders with his run down the flank, but at 35, he will play deeper." Giggs has begun taking his coaching badges and Ferguson has hinted that he would like Giggs to serve as his coaching staff after retirement like Ole Gunnar Solskjær did.

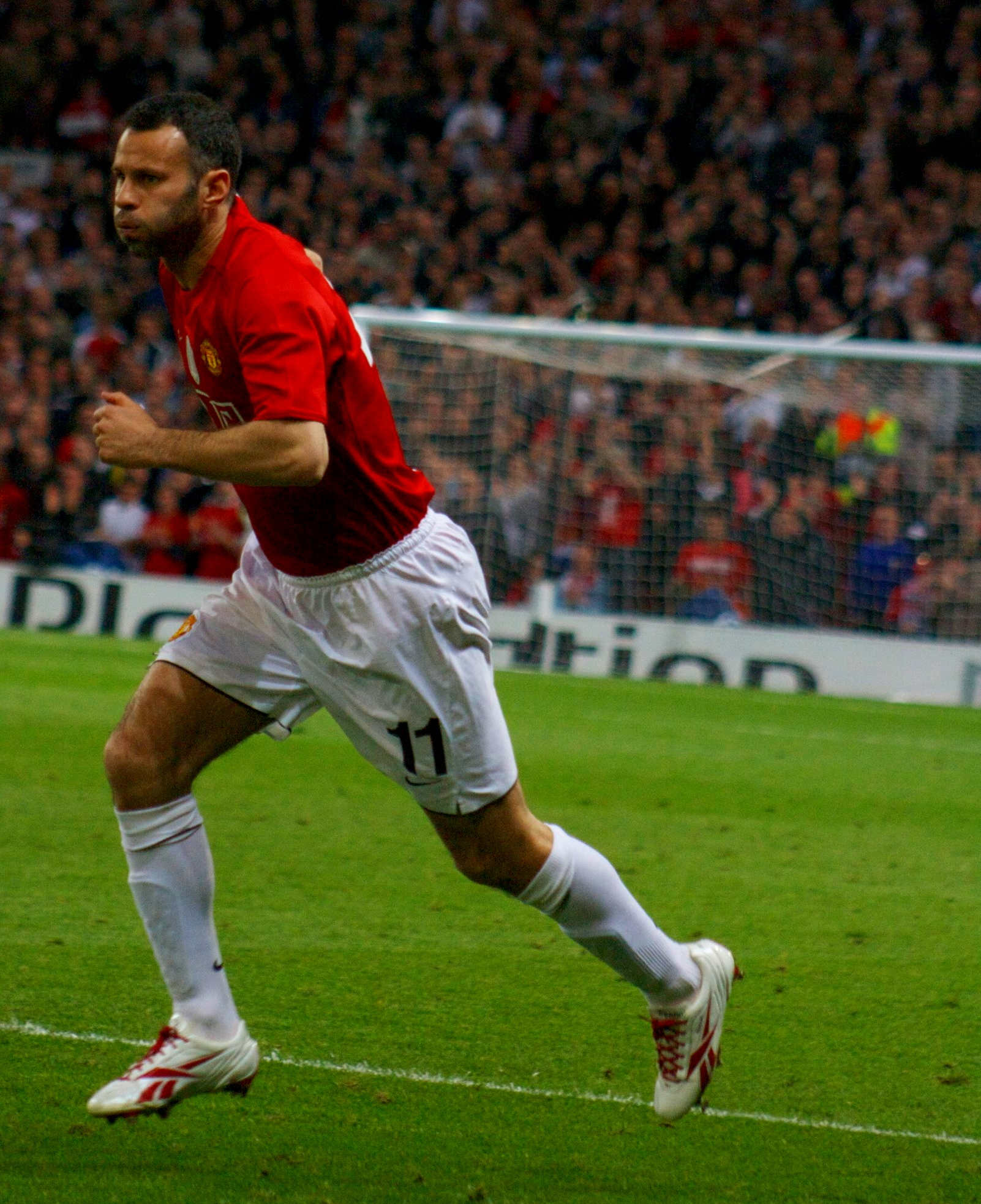
Giggs has played in the UEFA Champions League over 100 times.

Following speculation earlier in the year, in February 2009, Giggs signed a one-year extension to his current contract – which was due to expire in June 2009. After a successful season, Giggs was short-listed along with four other Manchester United teammates for the PFA Player of the Year. On 26 April 2009, Giggs received the award, despite having started just 12 games throughout the 2008–09 season (at the time of receiving the trophy). This was the first time in his career that Giggs had received the award. Prior to the awards ceremony, Alex Ferguson had given his backing for Giggs to win the award and stated that it would be fitting, given Giggs' long term contribution to the game. Giggs made his 800th appearance for Manchester United on 29 April 2009, in the 1–0 semi-final win over Arsenal in the UEFA Champions League. On 16 May 2009, Manchester United won the Premier League after a 0–0 draw against Arsenal, both United's and Giggs' 11th Premier League titles.

Giggs scored his first Manchester United hat-trick in a pre-season friendly against Hangzhou Greentown after coming on as a second-half substitute.

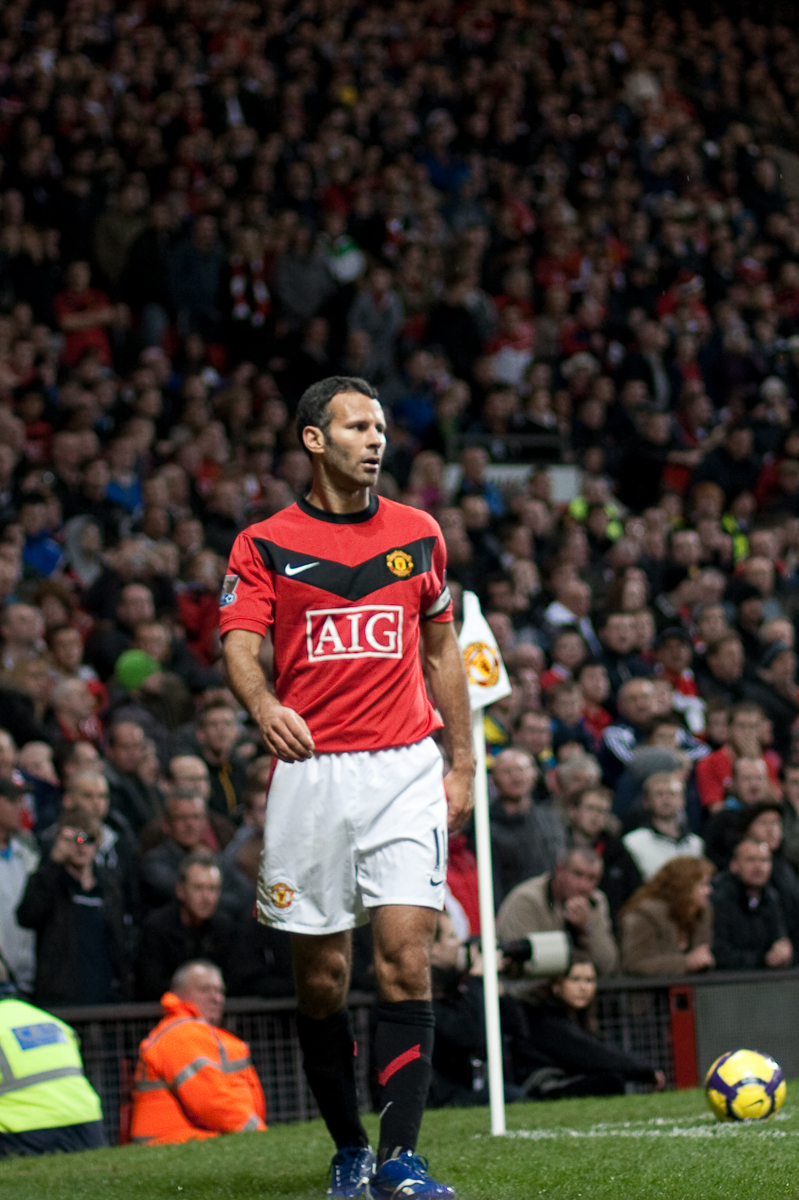
Giggs before a corner kick against Everton at Old Trafford in 2009

On 12 September 2009, Giggs made his 700th start for United. Giggs scored his 150th goal for United, only the ninth player to do so for the club, against Wolfsburg in his first UEFA Champions League game of the season. On 28 November 2009, the eve of his 36th birthday, Giggs scored his 100th Premier League goal – all for Manchester United – scoring the final goal in a 4–1 victory over Portsmouth at Fratton Park, and becoming only the 17th player to reach the milestone in the Premier League.

On 30 November 2009, the day after his 36th birthday, it was reported that Giggs would be offered an additional one-year contract which would run until the end of the 2010–11 season and see him past the 20th anniversary of his first game and first goal for United. On the same day, Giggs was nominated for BBC Sports Personality of the Year 2009, which he subsequently won. On 12 December 2009, Giggs' surpassed countryman Gary Speed's outfield record of 535 Premier League games. On 18 December 2009, Giggs signed a one-year contract extension with United, keeping him at the club until June 2011, taking him past the 20th anniversary of his first professional contract and that of his first-team debut – a rare occurrence of a player reaching the 20-year mark with the same club and with unbroken service. On 31 December 2009, Giggs was named the Manchester United Player of the Decade.

=== 2010–2014 ===
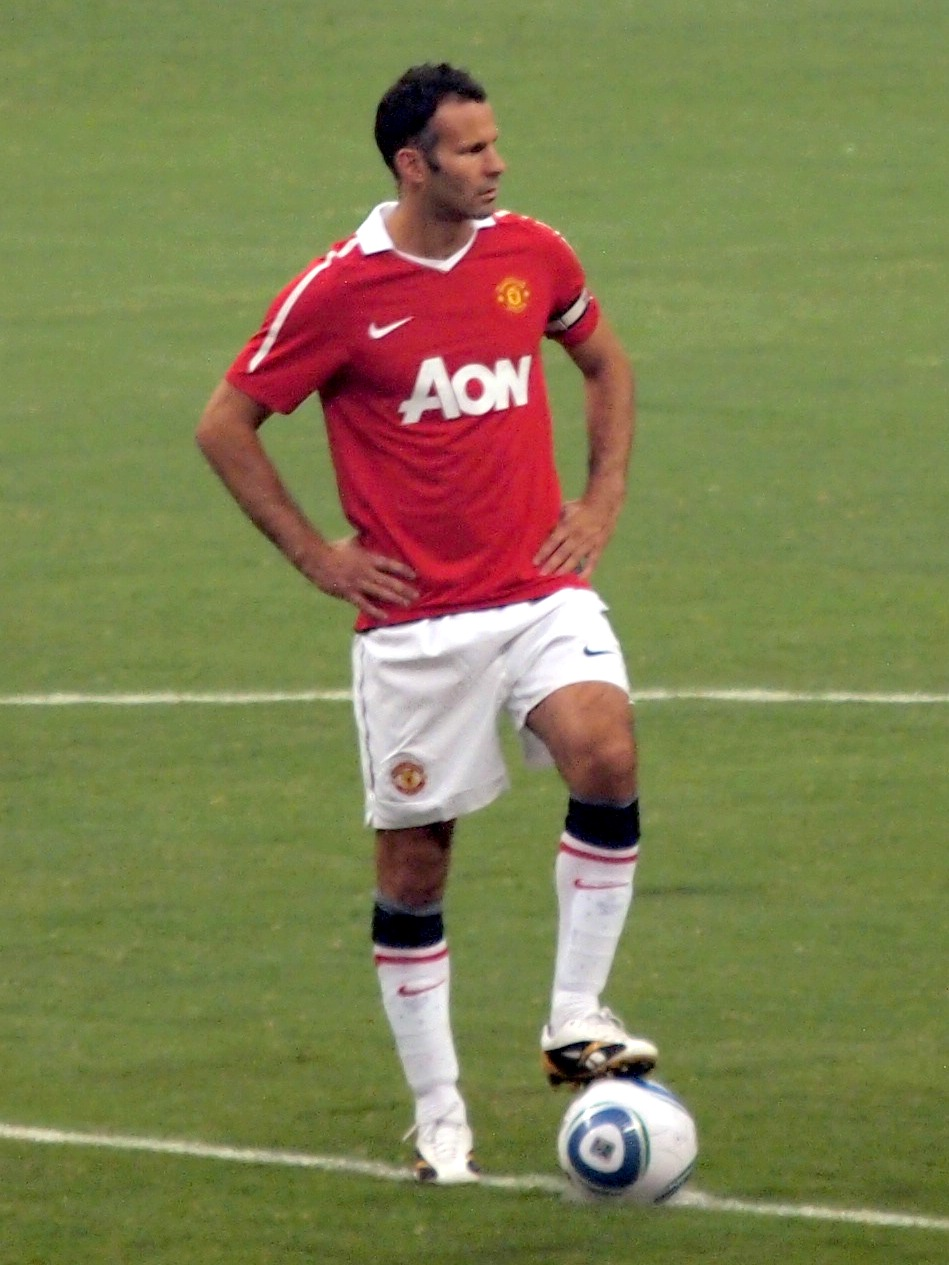
Giggs playing for Manchester United in 2010

On 24 April 2010, Giggs scored the first ever league penalties of his career, netting two penalties in a 3–1 home win over Tottenham Hotspur.

On 16 August 2010, Giggs kept up his record of scoring in every Premier League season since its inception as he netted United's third in their 3–0 home victory over Newcastle United in their opening fixture of the new campaign. As he found the net in the final two seasons of the old Football League First Division, he had now scored in 21 successive top division campaigns. On 17 January 2011, Giggs reached 600 league appearances (all for Manchester United), as he played in their goalless draw against Tottenham at White Hart Lane. Giggs signed a one-year contract extension with Manchester United on 18 February, keeping him at the club until June 2012. On 6 March 2011, Giggs surpassed the Manchester United league appearance record of Bobby Charlton by playing his 607th game against Liverpool. On 26 April, against Schalke 04 in the Champions League semi-final first leg, Giggs scored the first goal from a Wayne Rooney pass, also making himself the oldest goalscorer in Champions League history to date. Giggs also played in the 2011 UEFA Champions League Final, where Manchester United were defeated 3–1 by Barcelona.

Giggs made his first start of the 2011–12 season in the UEFA Champions League away at Benfica. He scored United's equalising goal in a 1–1 draw at the Estádio da Luz, in the process breaking his own record for the oldest goalscorer in Champions League history. He also became the first man ever to score in 16 different Champions League campaigns, moving clear of Raúl who was tied with Giggs on 15 seasons. Raúl though holds the record for scoring in 14 consecutive Champions League seasons. On 19 November, Giggs played in a league game in his home country of Wales for the first time in his distinguished career against Swansea City at the Liberty Stadium in a United 1–0 win. Giggs maintained his record of scoring in each of the past 22 top-flight seasons by scoring United's third goal against Fulham at Craven Cottage in a 5–0 win on 21 December, his first of the season in the league. On 10 February 2012, Giggs signed a one-year contract extension with Manchester United.

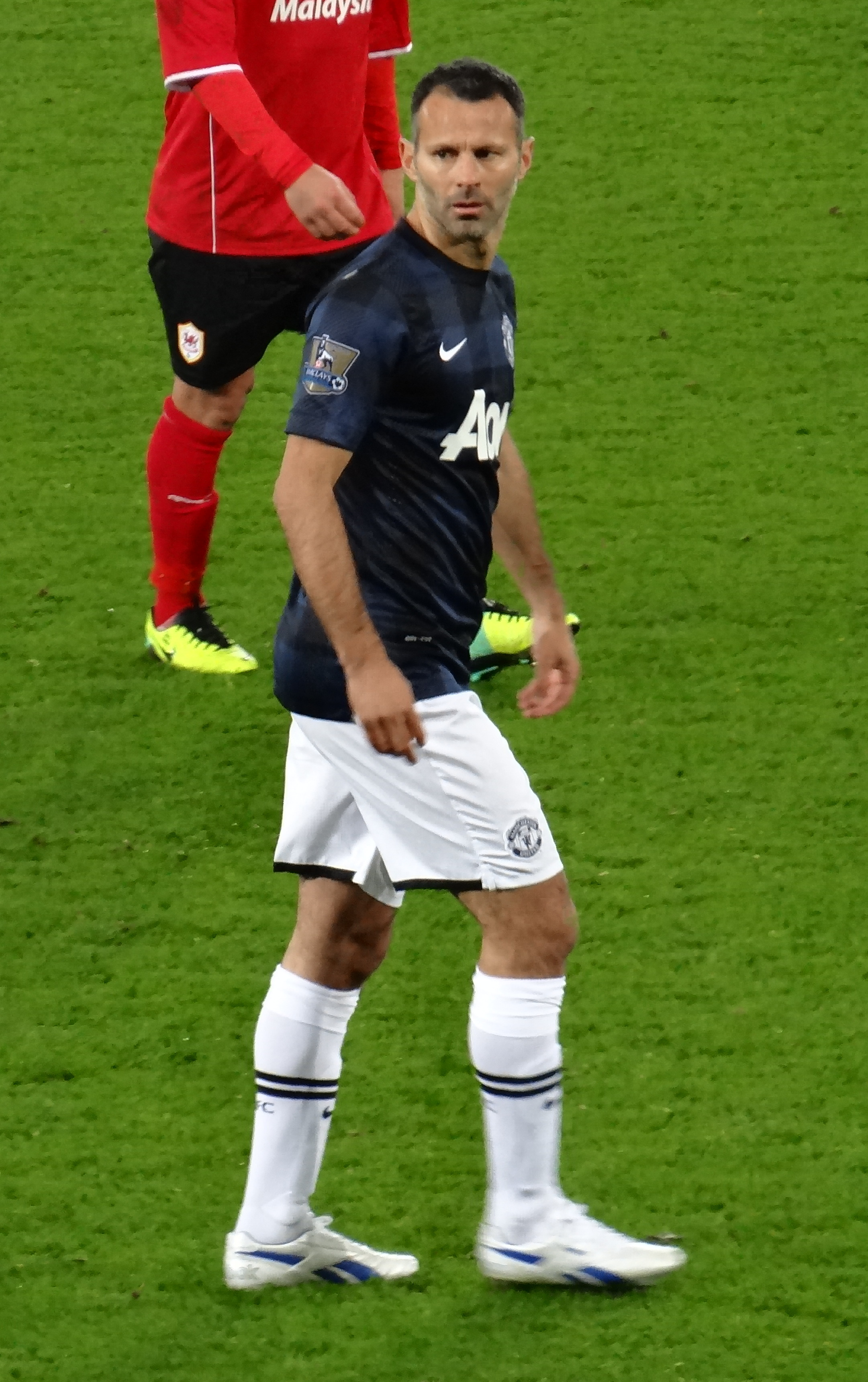
Giggs playing against his hometown club, Cardiff City, for the first time in November 2013

On 26 February 2012, Giggs made his 900th appearance for Manchester United, in a 2–1 away win against Norwich City. He marked the occasion by scoring the winning goal in the 90th minute, scoring from a cross by Ashley Young. After the match, Alex Ferguson told BBC Sport he believed that a player playing in 900 games for one club "won't be done again". By March 2011, Giggs had played with more than 140 different players for the Manchester United first team.

On 19 October 2012, Giggs (just over a month short of his 39th birthday) told The Daily Telegraph that he would like to move into management when he retires as a player. He also said that he was still undecided on whether he would still be playing after the current football season ends.

Giggs scored his first Premier League goal of the 2012–13 season against Everton on 10 February 2013 in a 2–0 home win, extending his goalscoring sequence to 23 consecutive seasons in the highest division including all 21 Premier League seasons.

He signed a new one-year contract with Manchester United on 1 March 2013, keeping him at Old Trafford until June 2014. On 5 March, Giggs made his 1,000th competitive appearance in a 2–1 home loss to Real Madrid in the second leg of the round of 16 of the UEFA Champions League. On 4 July, Giggs was appointed as player-coach by new manager David Moyes with immediate effect. Giggs became interim player-manager when Moyes was sacked in April 2014.

On 2 October, after coming off the substitute bench against Shakhtar Donetsk, Giggs became all-time leading appearance holder in the European competition, overtaking Raúl, an achievement he described as "special". In November, Giggs celebrated his 40th birthday, leading to media outlets and football figures praising him for reaching the milestone while still an active professional footballer.

Giggs announced his retirement from professional football on 19 May 2014 in an open letter to all Manchester United fans posted on the club website. Upon retirement, Giggs received many plaudits for the achievements he earned throughout his career, and the longevity of it.

== International career ==
=== England Schoolboys ===
Born in Cardiff to Welsh parents, Giggs represented Wales at international level. As a youngster, Giggs captained England Schoolboys, but contrary to popular belief, he was never eligible for the senior England team (eligibility at the schoolboy level depends solely upon the location of the school, in Giggs' case Moorside High School in Salford). In October 2009, new rules were introduced for the Home Nations' associations that would have enabled Giggs to represent England had he not already represented Wales in an official competition, but Giggs has always maintained that he would have chosen to play for Wales anyway; he stated in 2002, "I'd rather go through my career without qualifying for a major championship than play for a country where I wasn't born or which my parents didn't have anything to do with".

In his one year with the England Schoolboys team, Giggs played nine times, all as captain, winning seven matches and losing twice. Among the wins was a 4–0 victory over his Welsh peers, many of whom he would play alongside when he made the step up to the Welsh youth team the following year.

=== Wales ===
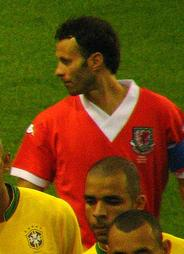
Giggs played for Wales 64 times, but never at a major international tournament.

In May 1991, Giggs made his debut for the Wales Under-21s, a 2–1 victory over Poland in Warsaw. It would turn out to be his only appearance for the team, as he received a call-up to the senior team later that year.

Giggs made his international debut away to Germany in October 1991, coming on as an 84th-minute substitute for Eric Young at the age of 17 years, 321 days to become the youngest player to appear for the Welsh senior team; he held this record until June 1998, when Ryan Green appeared against Malta at the age of 17 years, 226 days. Wales were still in contention to qualify for UEFA Euro 1992 before the game, but a 4–1 victory for the Germans, who went on to win their remaining games against Belgium and Luxembourg, meant they qualified at Wales' expense.

Giggs' first senior goal for Wales came on 31 March 1993 in a 3–0 win over Belgium in Cardiff in a World Cup qualifying game, the same game in which Ian Rush scored for Wales for a record 24th time.

After his international debut in 1991 against Germany, Giggs missed 18 consecutive friendly games before finally making his first friendly appearance for Wales against Finland in March 2000, by which time he had already accrued 25 caps. The reason for his continued absence from non-competitive fixtures was largely a protective measure against unnecessary injuries; in his autobiography, Giggs states: "At that time, whenever I played two games in one week I always seemed to pick up an injury, so [Alex Ferguson] and I sat down and looked at it game by game. If the international was a friendly, the feeling was that I didn't have to play." Regardless, his regularly withdrawing from Wales squads and routinely missing friendlies was criticised.

In a qualifier against England for the 2006 FIFA World Cup at Old Trafford where Wales lost 2–0, Giggs played against some present and former Manchester United teammates including David Beckham, Gary Neville, and Wayne Rooney. During a 2006 World Cup qualifier against Azerbaijan on 12 October 2005, Giggs scored a rare double in a 2–0 win, but Wales failed to reach the play-offs.

In May 2006, Giggs turned out for the first time for Wales in a friendly away from home in an uncapped match against the Basque Country (Basque: Euskal Selekzioa) in Bilbao. He captained the team and scored the game's only goal in a 1-0 win for Wales.

In September 2006, he played in a friendly against Brazil at White Hart Lane where Wales lost 2–0. Brazil coach Dunga complimented Giggs' performance by stating he would not look out of place playing for the five-time world champions alongside stars such as Kaká and Ronaldinho.

Giggs announced his retirement from international football on Wednesday, 30 May 2007, at a press conference held at The Vale of Glamorgan Hotel, drawing the curtain on a 16-year international career. He cited concentrating on his United career as the main reason for stepping down. His final game for Wales, and as captain, was the Euro 2008 qualifier against the Czech Republic on 2 June at Cardiff. He earned his 64th cap in this game and won the Man of the Match award as Wales drew 0–0. In November, he was one of three players in the final nomination by the FAW for the Wales Player of the Year award, which was ultimately won by Craig Bellamy.

In an interview with the Western Mail on 26 March 2010, Giggs hinted that he might be tempted to come out of international retirement for his country's UEFA Euro 2012 qualifying campaign, in order to cover for the injured Aaron Ramsey. He later clarified his position to BBC Radio Manchester, saying that he would only return to Wales duty in an emergency.

=== Great Britain ===
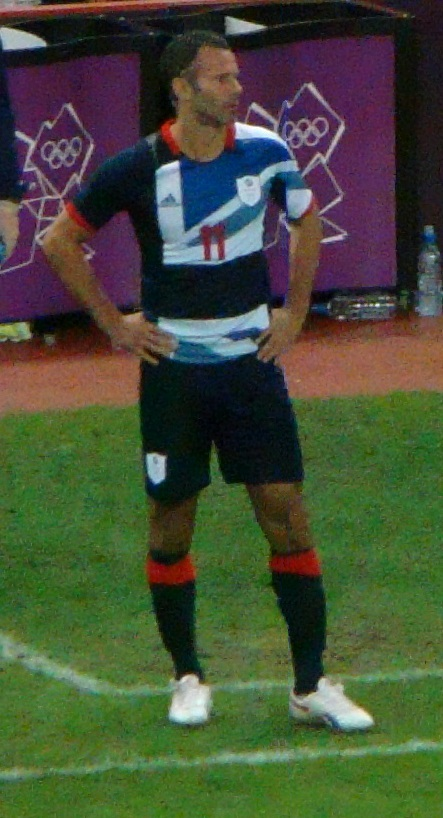
For the 2012 Summer Olympics in London, Great Britain entered a team for the first time in over 40 years, with Giggs as captain.

On 28 June 2012, Giggs was confirmed as one of the three over-age players selected for Great Britain to compete at 2012 Summer Olympics alongside Craig Bellamy and Micah Richards, and he was subsequently named the team captain.

He scored with a header against the United Arab Emirates in a 3–1 win on 29 July to become the oldest goalscorer in the football competition at the Summer Olympics at the age of 38 years and 243 days, beating an 88-year-old record that had been held by Egypt's Hussein Hegazi. In addition, by featuring in the same match, he became the oldest outfield Olympic footballer.

== Managerial career ==
=== Manchester United ===
Giggs was appointed as a player-coach at Manchester United on 4 July 2013, as part of the coaching staff under new manager David Moyes. When Moyes was sacked on 22 April 2014, after less than 10 months in the job, Giggs took over as the club's interim player-manager, compiling a record of two wins, a draw and a defeat in the final four games of the 2013–14 season. After his final match in charge, a 1–1 draw with Southampton, Giggs admitted to breaking down in tears, in part due to the pressure of managing United, and also said he had struggled to sleep during the period. When Louis van Gaal was announced as Moyes' permanent replacement on 19 May 2014, Giggs was also appointed as Van Gaal's assistant manager.

Giggs was praised for giving debuts to youngsters James Wilson and Tom Lawrence in a 3–1 victory over Hull City, a game in which he brought himself on as a substitute for Lawrence.

Giggs was suggested by many – including Louis van Gaal – as the Dutchman's potential successor at Manchester United. However, following the appointment of Portuguese coach José Mourinho, Giggs announced his departure from the club on 2 July 2016.

=== Wales ===
A short video of Giggs on the 70th birthday of the NHS

Giggs was appointed manager of the Wales national team on 15 January 2018 on a four-year contract, succeeding Chris Coleman, who had left the role to take up the manager's position at Sunderland the previous November. His first match in charge was in a 6–0 win over China during the 2018 China Cup, where Gareth Bale broke the all-time scoring record previously held by Ian Rush. Later that year, Wales participated in the UEFA Nations League, finishing behind Denmark with six points. In 2019, Wales had a slow start to their qualifying group, only accruing three points from three matches. However, they went unbeaten for the rest of the year, culminating in a 2–0 win over Hungary and securing qualification for UEFA Euro 2020. The resulting tournament was delayed due to the COVID-19 pandemic, and the next time that Giggs would manage the national team was behind closed doors during the UEFA Nations League campaign. His final match in charge was a 1–0 win over Bulgaria.

On 3 November 2020, and following Giggs' arrest on assault charges, his assistant manager Rob Page became the caretaker manager. On 20 June 2022, it was announced that Giggs would step down from his position due to his upcoming trial.

== Player profile ==
=== Style of play ===
This is embarrassing to say but I have cried twice in my life watching a football player. The first one was Maradona and the second was Ryan Giggs.

— Alessandro Del Piero

A skilful and dynamic left-footed midfielder, Giggs usually played as a traditional out-and-out left-sided midfielder, who would take on opposing defenders, although he was a versatile player, who was capable of playing on either flank, as well as in several other positions; throughout his career he was also fielded in various offensive roles, as a left or right-sided winger or outside forward in an attacking trident, as an attacking midfielder, as a deep-lying forward, or even as a striker. In the later stages of his career, as his pace and athleticism declined, he was often used as a defensive or central midfielder, or as a deep-lying playmaker; he was even deployed as a full-back on occasion. A quick and technically gifted player, in his prime, his main traits were his speed, acceleration, strength, ball control, flair, dribbling skills, and trickery in possession, as well as his vision; he also was able to refine his crossing and passing ability as his career progressed, which made him an excellent assist provider, and saw him take on more of a playmaking role for his team in later years, which enabled him to dictate play in midfield and create chances for teammates, in addition to scoring goals himself. A fast and energetic player, he also drew praise in the media for his tactical intelligence, movement, stamina, work-rate, and consistency; furthermore, he was an accurate free kick taker. In addition to his footballing skills, Giggs also stood out for his leadership and longevity throughout his career. (Note: See)

=== Discipline ===
Giggs was never sent off in his 24-season playing career for Manchester United and was only once sent off when playing for Wales, on 5 September 2001 in a World Cup qualifier against Norway; Giggs received a second yellow card in the 86th minute. In November 2003, he was found guilty of improper conduct by the FA due to his behaviour during the Battle of Old Trafford game against Arsenal (one of two United and six Arsenal players charged over the incident); Giggs received a £7,500 fine but avoided suspension. In the same week, Giggs received a two-match suspension from international football for deliberately elbowing Russian player Vadim Yevseyev in the face during the first leg of the Euro 2004 play-offs. The offence was missed by referee Lucílio Batista, but Giggs was later charged using video evidence.

== Endorsements and public image ==
Giggs featured in advertisements for Reebok, ITV Digital, Kagome tomato juice, Quorn and Celcom. A 1996 Reebok advertisement, which did not feature him, included figures such as Sting, Tom Jones, Richard Attenborough and George Best impersonating him.

According to an article by BBC Sport: "In the early 1990s, Giggs was David Beckham before Beckham was even holding down a place in the United first team. If you put his face on the cover of a football magazine, it guaranteed you the biggest sales of the year. Why? Men would buy it to read about 'the new Best' and girls bought it because they wanted his face all over their bedroom walls. Giggs had the million-pound boot deal (Reebok), the lucrative sponsorship deals in the Far East (Fuji) and the celebrity girlfriends (Dani Behr, Davinia Taylor) at a time when Beckham was being sent on loan to Preston North End."

Giggs features in EA Sports' FIFA video game series, and was selected to appear on the cover of FIFA Football 2003 alongside Dutch international midfielder Edgar Davids, and Brazilian international fullback Roberto Carlos. Giggs was included in the FIFA 16 and 17 Ultimate Team Legends.

== Personal life ==
=== Family ===
Giggs is the son of former rugby union and Wales international rugby league footballer Danny Wilson. Giggs was christened Ryan Joseph Wilson but as a teenager changed his surname to that of his mother after his parents separated. Giggs is said to have inherited his balance and athleticism from his father. He is a distant cousin of the Barbados international footballer Curtis Hutson.

Giggs married his long-time partner, Stacey Cooke, in a private ceremony on 7 September 2007. They have two children, both born in Salford, and lived in Worsley, Greater Manchester, close to where the player grew up. Giggs and Cooke divorced in 2017. His son Zach Giggs is also a footballer.

Giggs conducted an eight-year affair with his brother Rhodri's wife, Natasha. The affair resulted in members of Giggs' family repudiating their former ties to Ryan; after Ryan was appointed as manager of the Wales national team, his father Danny said he was "ashamed" of him and that "I can't even bring myself to use his name".

=== Activism ===
In August 2006, Giggs became an ambassador for UNICEF UK, in recognition for his work with Manchester United's 'United for UNICEF' partnership with the children's organisation. Giggs visited UNICEF projects in Thailand and told the BBC: "As a footballer I can't imagine life without the use of one of my legs... Sadly this is exactly what happens to thousands of children every year when they accidentally step on a landmine."

=== Post-playing career ===
In October 2010, Giggs said he would "probably finish [his] career here [Old Trafford]", and that he could not see himself "dropping down leagues and playing at a lesser level". He said he wanted to go into coaching, describing the management of Manchester United or Wales as "the two ultimate jobs", and stating that he was halfway through his UEFA 'A' coaching licence.

Gary Neville, ahead of his 2011 testimonial, said he would put the proceeds towards a supporters club and hotel near Old Trafford. Trafford Council approved the hotel in 2012 despite objections from Manchester United. In 2013, Giggs and Neville launched a hospitality company named GG Hospitality, with plans to build football-themed hotels and cafés around the United Kingdom, initially in Manchester and London. The first operation was a football-themed restaurant named Café Football in Stratford, London, which opened in November 2013, with Hotel Football, previously under the guise of the supporters club Neville announced in 2011, scheduled to be opened in late 2014.

In 2014, it was announced that Giggs, along with former Manchester United players Gary Neville, Paul Scholes, Nicky Butt and Phil Neville, had agreed a deal to purchase Salford City ahead of the 2014–15 season. with plans to get the club to the Football League. The group announced they would take part in a special friendly, with Salford facing a Class of '92 team. On 22 September, the group agreed to sell a 50% stake in the club to billionaire Peter Lim.

Giggs was signed as the marquee player of the Mumbai 5s for the inaugural season of the Premier Futsal League; an Indian semi-professional futsal competition. He led the team to victory in the final, with Mumbai defeating Kerala 3-2.

In September 2017, along with former United teammates including Gary Neville, Giggs proposed a university in Greater Manchester, named University Academy 92 which would offer "broader courses than traditional degrees" and attract students who "otherwise might not go on to higher education".

In November 2017, it was reported that Giggs had signed a consultancy deal with the Promotion Fund of Vietnamese Football Talents FC (PVF). The two-year deal would involve making two trips per year to Vietnam.

=== Gagging order ===
In May 2011, it was reported in non-UK media sources that Giggs was the identity of CTB in CTB v News Group Newspapers, a footballer who had obtained an anonymised gagging order in relation to an alleged extra-marital affair with model Imogen Thomas. Giggs took legal action against the social networking site Twitter after he was named by a user in a list of identities of individuals who had allegedly taken out so-called "super-injunctions". A blogger for Forbes magazine remarked that Giggs had "not heard of the Streisand effect", observing that mentions of his name had increased significantly after the case against Twitter had been reported.

On 22 May 2011, the Sunday Herald, a Scottish newspaper, published a thinly-disguised photograph of Giggs on its front page, with the word "CENSORED" covering his eyes. Sunday Herald editor Richard Walker stated that the London High Court ruling had no force in Scotland, unless copies of the paper were sold in England or Wales. On 23 May, the gagging order set off a political controversy, with Prime Minister David Cameron commenting that the law should be reviewed to "catch up with how people consume media today". On the same day, Liberal Democrat MP John Hemming used parliamentary privilege to name Giggs as CTB.

=== Arrest and trial ===
On 3 November 2020, Giggs was arrested on suspicion of two counts of assault against his ex-girlfriend Kate Greville and her younger sister Emma.

In April 2021, he was charged with assault that caused actual bodily harm to Kate Greville as well as coercive and controlling behaviour against her. On 28 April, he appeared in court, where he denied the charges.

His trial began on 8 August 2022. The jury of seven women and four men was discharged on 31 August, having been unable to reach a verdict on any of the charges. On 18 July 2023, two weeks before he was due to face a retrial, Giggs was cleared as the Crown Prosecution Service withdrew charges. The prosecutor said that Kate Greville was unwilling to give evidence in the retrial.

== Career statistics ==
=== Club ===
Club appearances and goals by season by competition
Club	Season	League			FA Cup		League Cup		Europe		Other (Note: Includes FA Community Shield, UEFA Super Cup, Intercontinental Cup, FIFA Club World Cup.)		Total	
Club	Season	Division	Apps	Goals	Apps	Goals	Apps	Goals	Apps	Goals	Apps	Goals	Apps	Goals
Manchester United	1990–91	First Division	2	1	0	0	0	0	0	0	0	0	2	1
Manchester United	1991–92	First Division	38	4	3	0	8	3	1	0	1	0	51	7
Manchester United	1992–93	Premier League	41	9	2	2	2	0	1	0	–		46	11
Manchester United	1993–94	Premier League	38	13	7	1	8	3	4	0	1	0	58	17
Manchester United	1994–95	Premier League	29	1	7	1	0	0	3	2	1	0	40	4
Manchester United	1995–96	Premier League	33	11	7	1	2	0	2	0	–		44	12
Manchester United	1996–97	Premier League	26	3	3	0	0	0	7	2	1	0	37	5
Manchester United	1997–98	Premier League	29	8	2	0	0	0	5	1	1	0	37	9
Manchester United	1998–99	Premier League	24	3	6	2	1	0	9	5	1	0	41	10
Manchester United	1999–2000	Premier League	30	6	–		0	0	11	1	3	0	44	7
Manchester United	2000–01	Premier League	31	5	2	0	0	0	11	2	1	0	45	7
Manchester United	2001–02	Premier League	25	7	1	0	0	0	13	2	1	0	40	9
Manchester United	2002–03	Premier League	36	8	3	2	5	0	15	4	–		59	14
Manchester United	2003–04	Premier League	33	7	5	0	0	0	8	1	1	0	47	8
Manchester United	2004–05	Premier League	32	5	4	0	1	1	6	2	1	0	44	8
Manchester United	2005–06	Premier League	27	3	2	1	3	0	5	1	–		37	5
Manchester United	2006–07	Premier League	30	4	6	0	0	0	8	2	–		44	6
Manchester United	2007–08	Premier League	31	3	2	0	0	0	9	0	1	1	43	4
Manchester United	2008–09	Premier League	28	2	2	0	4	1	11	1	2	0	47	4
Manchester United	2009–10	Premier League	25	5	1	0	2	1	3	1	1	0	32	7
Manchester United	2010–11	Premier League	25	2	3	1	1	0	8	1	1	0	38	4
Manchester United	2011–12	Premier League	25	2	2	0	1	1	5	1	0	0	33	4
Manchester United	2012–13	Premier League	22	2	4	1	1	2	5	0	–		32	5
Manchester United	2013–14	Premier League	12	0	0	0	2	0	7	0	1	0	22	0
Total			672	114	74	12	41	12	157	29	19	1	963	168

=== International ===
Appearances and goals by national team and year
National team	Year	Apps	Goals
Wales	1991	2	0
Wales	1992	3	0
Wales	1993	6	2
Wales	1994	1	1
Wales	1995	3	0
Wales	1996	3	1
Wales	1997	3	1
Wales	1998	1	0
Wales	1999	3	1
Wales	2000	4	1
Wales	2001	5	0
Wales	2002	5	0
Wales	2003	7	1
Wales	2004	3	0
Wales	2005	6	3
Wales	2006	5	0
Wales	2007	4	1
Total		64	12
Wales XI	2006	1	1
Total		1	1
Great Britain Olympic team	2012	4	1
Total		4	1

Scores and results list Wales' and Great Britain's goal tally first, score column indicates score after each Giggs goal.

List of international goals scored by Ryan Giggs
No.	Date	Venue	Opponent	Score	Result	Competition
Wales goals
1	31 March 1993	National Stadium, Cardiff, Cardiff, Wales	Belgium	1–0	2–0	1994 FIFA World Cup qualification
2	8 September 1993	National Stadium, Cardiff, Wales	RCS	1–1	2–2	1994 FIFA World Cup qualification
3	7 September 1994	National Stadium, Cardiff, Wales	Albania	2–0	2–0	UEFA Euro 1996 qualification
4	2 June 1996	San Marino Stadium, Serravalle, San Marino	San Marino	4–0	5–0	1998 FIFA World Cup qualification
5	11 October 1997	King Baudouin Stadium, Brussels, Belgium	Belgium	2–3	2–3	1998 FIFA World Cup qualification
6	4 September 1999	Dinamo Stadium, Minsk, Belarus	Belarus	2–1	2–1	UEFA Euro 2000 qualification
7	29 March 2000	Millennium Stadium, Cardiff, Wales	Finland	1–2	1–2	Friendly
8	29 March 2003	Millennium Stadium, Cardiff, Wales	Azerbaijan	4–0	4–0	UEFA Euro 2004 qualification
9	8 October 2005	Windsor Park, Belfast, Northern Ireland	Northern Ireland	3–2	3–2	2006 FIFA World Cup qualification
10	12 October 2005	Millennium Stadium, Cardiff, Wales	Azerbaijan	1–0	2–0	2006 FIFA World Cup qualification
11	12 October 2005	Millennium Stadium, Cardiff, Wales	Azerbaijan	2–0	2–0	2006 FIFA World Cup qualification
12	28 March 2007	Millennium Stadium, Cardiff, Wales	San Marino	1–0	3–0	UEFA Euro 2008 qualification
Wales XI goals
1	21 May 2006	San Mamés Stadium, Bilbao, Spain	Basque Country	1–0	1–0	Uncapped friendly
Great Britain Olympic team goals
1	29 July 2012	Wembley Stadium, London, United Kingdom	United Arab Emirates	1–0	3–1	2012 Summer Olympics

=== Managerial record ===
As of match played 30 March 2021

Team	From	To	Record					
Team	From	To	G	W	D	L	Win %	Ref.
Manchester United (interim)	22 April 2014	11 May 2014	4	2	1	1	50.00	
Wales	15 January 2018	3 November 2020	25	12	5	8	48.00	
Total			29	14	6	9	48.28	

== Honours ==
Manchester United

- Premier League: 1992–93, 1993–94, 1995–96, 1996–97, 1998–99, 1999–2000, 2000–01, 2002–03, 2006–07, 2007–08, 2008–09, 2010–11, 2012–13
- FA Cup: 1993–94, 1995–96, 1998–99, 2003–04; runner-up: 1994–95, 2004–05, 2006–07
- Football League Cup: 1991–92, 2005–06, 2008–09, 2009–10; runner-up: 1993–94, 2002–03
- FA Community Shield: 1993, 1994, 1996, 1997, 2003, 2007, 2008, 2010, 2011, 2013
- UEFA Champions League: 1998–99, 2007–08; runner-up: 2008–09, 2010–11
- UEFA Super Cup: 1991
- Intercontinental Cup: 1999
- FIFA Club World Cup: 2008

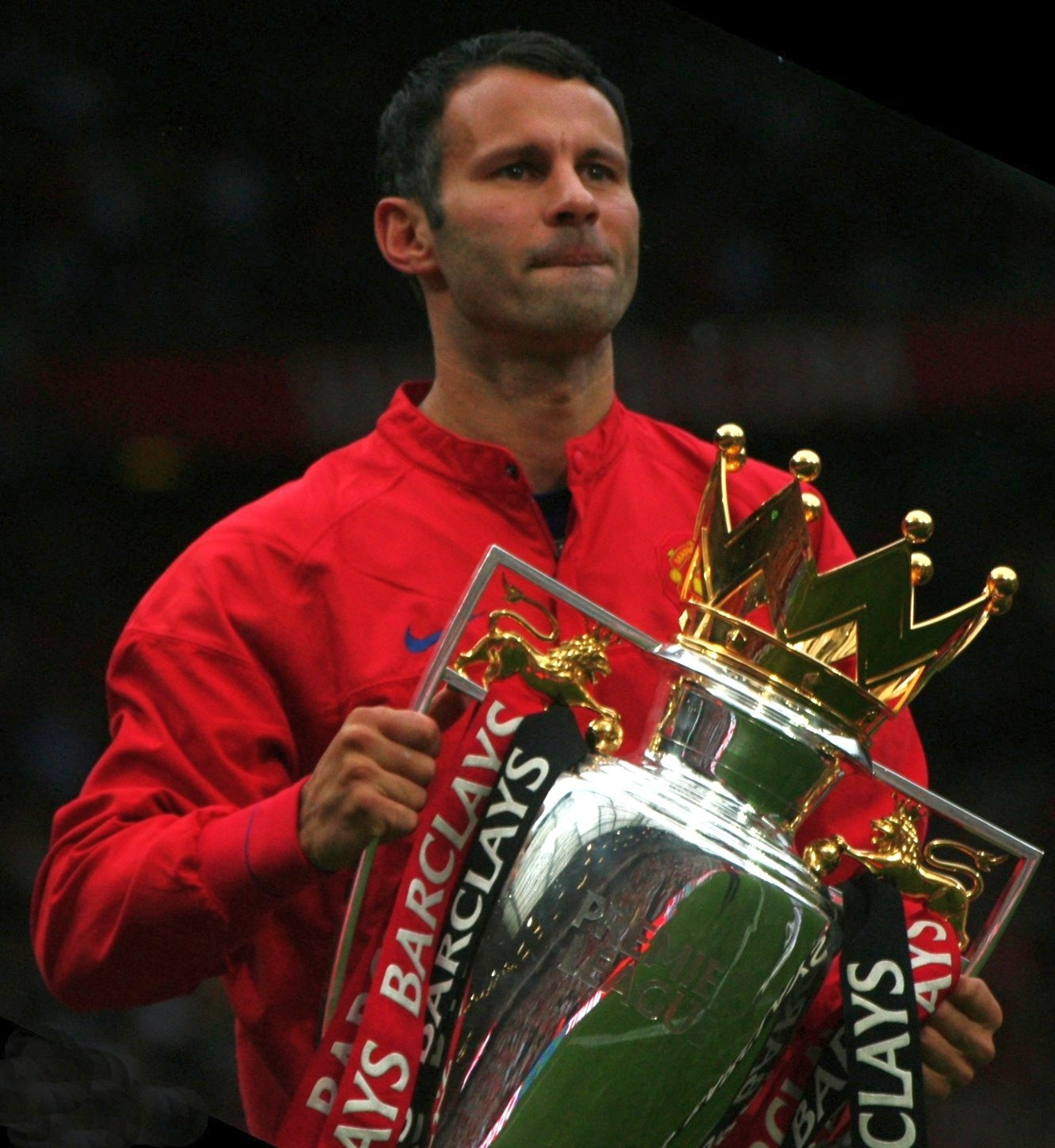
Ryan Giggs with the Premier League trophy in 2008

Individual

- Bravo Award: 1993
- PFA Young Player of the Year: 1991–92, 1992–93
- PFA Players' Player of the Year: 2008–09
- PFA Team of the Year: 1992–93 Premier League, 1997–98 Premier League, 2000–01 Premier League, 2001–02 Premier League, 2006–07 Premier League, 2008–09 Premier League
- PFA Team of the Century: 1997–2007
- PFA Merit Award: 2016
- BBC Sports Personality of the Year: 2009
- BBC Wales Sports Personality of the Year: 1996, 2009
- BBC Goal of the Season: 1998–99
- Welsh Footballer of the Year: 1996, 2006
- GQ Sportsman of the Year: 2010
- Sir Matt Busby Player of the Year: 1997–98
- Jimmy Murphy Young Player of the Year: 1990–91, 1991–92
- Manchester United Players' Player of the Year: 2005–06
- Premier League 10 Seasons Awards (1992–93 to 2001–02): Overall Team of the Decade
- Premier League 10 Seasons Awards (1992–93 to 2001–02): Domestic Team of the Decade
- Premier League 20 Seasons Awards (1992–93 to 2011–12): Best Player
- Premier League 20 Seasons Awards (1992–93 to 2011–12): Fantasy Teams of the 20 Seasons public and panel choice
- Premier League 20 Seasons Awards (1992–93 to 2011–12): Most Player Appearances (596)
- Premier League Player of the Month: August 2006, February 2007
- UEFA Champions League 10 Seasons Dream Team (1992 to 2002): 2002
- UEFA Champions League top assist provider: 2006–07
- English Football Hall of Fame Inductee: 2005
- Intercontinental Cup Most Valuable Player of the Match Award: 1999
- Golden Foot: 2011
- Globe Soccer Awards Player Career Award: 2019
- One Club Award: 2020
- FWA Tribute Award: 2007
- IFFHS Legends

Records

- Has won a record 13 top division English league titles as a player, and only Manchester United player to have winner's medals from all 13 Premier League title wins.
- Most Premier League appearances for a player, with 632 (since surpassed by Gareth Barry).
- Most Premier League assists for a player, with 162.
- Most UEFA Champions League assists for a player, with 41.
- Only player to have played in 22 successive Premier League seasons.
- Only player to have scored in 21 successive Premier League seasons.
- First player to have scored in 17 different Champions League tournaments (includes 11 consecutive tournaments, 1996–97 to 2006–07; Lionel Messi and Karim Benzema have a better record with 18)
- Most goals by a British player in the Champions League/European Cup proper history, and 14th overall (not including preliminary rounds).
- Most appearances by a Manchester United player.
- Most starts by a Manchester United player, started in 794 games.
- First player to score 100 Premier League goals for Manchester United.
- Second midfielder to have scored 100 goals in the Premier League for a single club (first being Matt Le Tissier).
- One of four Manchester United players to win two Champions League titles (others are Paul Scholes, Gary Neville and Wes Brown). The only player to play in two winning finals.
- Oldest (37 years, 289 days) player to score in the Champions League, when he scored against Benfica on 14 September 2011.
- One of two Manchester United players to win at least 10 top division medals (the other one is Paul Scholes.)
- Oldest (38 years, 243 days) player to score in the Football competition at the Summer Olympics, when he scored against United Arab Emirates on 29 July 2012.

State and civic honours

- OBE for services to football: 2007
- Honorary Master of Arts degree from the University of Salford for contributions to football and charity work in developing countries: 2008
- Freedom of the City of Salford: 7 January 2010. He is the 22nd person to receive the Freedom of the City of Salford.

== See also ==
- List of footballers with 100 or more UEFA Champions League appearances
- List of men's footballers with the most official appearances
