= Michel Boni =

Professional footballer

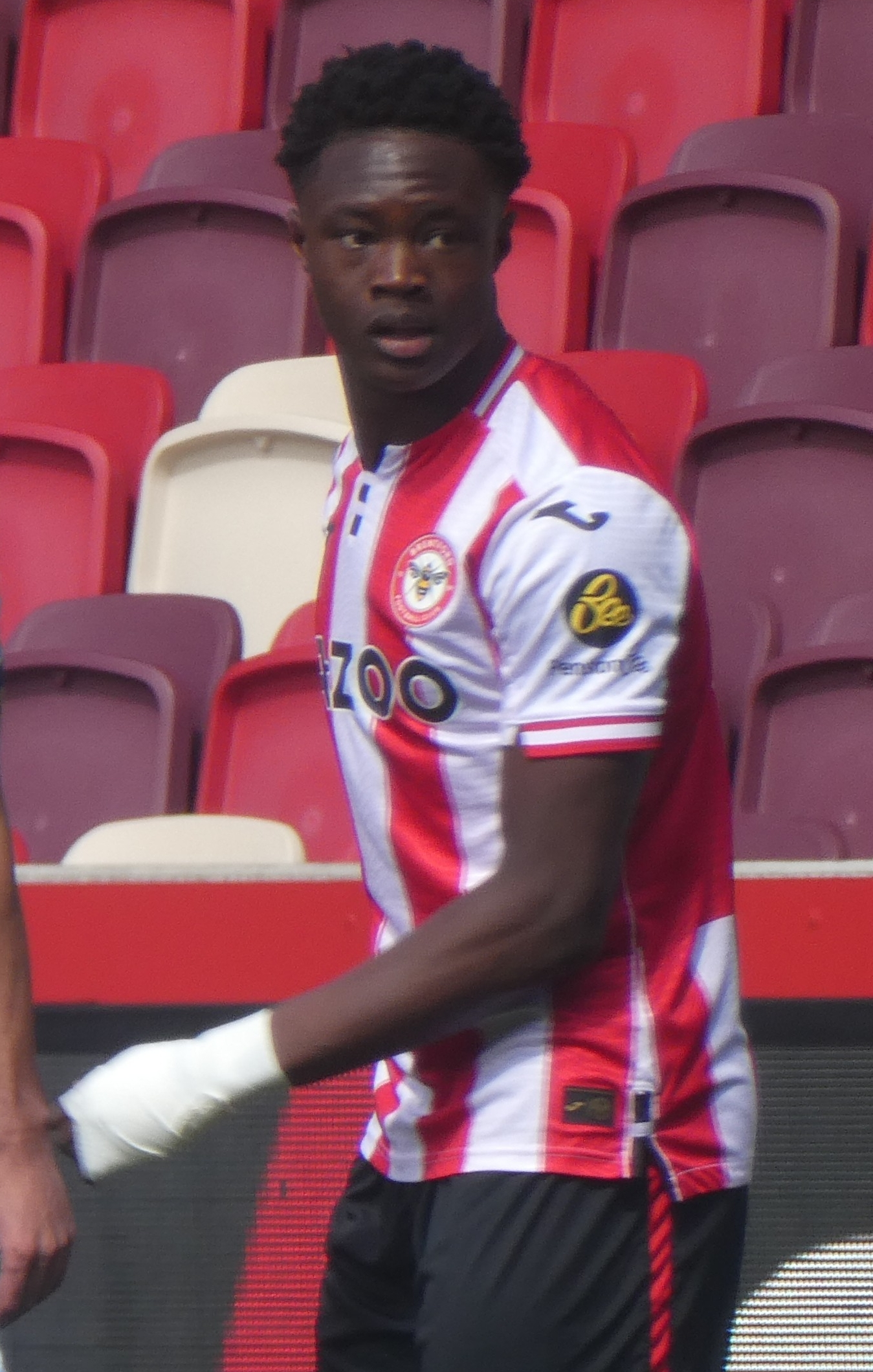
- Boni playing for Brentford B in 2026

Personal information
- Full name: Gbenankpon Michel Destiny Boni
- Date of birth: 28 March 2008 (age 18)
- Place of birth: Milton Keynes, England
- Height: 1.86 m (6 ft 1 in)
- Position: Forward

Team information
- Current team: Brentford

Youth career
- Pre Academy Soccer School
- –2024: Leicester City
- 2024–: Brentford

International career^{‡}
Years	Team	Apps	(Gls)
2026–	Benin	2	(0)
- ‡ National team caps and goals as of 11:15, 10 September 2026 (UTC)

Gbenankpon Michel Destiny Boni (born 28 March 2008) is a professional footballer who plays as a forward for Premier League club Brentford. Born in England, he plays for the Benin national team.

Boni is a product of the Leicester City and Brentford academies and began his professional career with the latter club in 2026.

== Club career ==
=== Brentford ===
After beginning his youth career in the Leicester City Academy, Boni commenced a two-year scholarship with the Brentford U18 team in 2024. After beginning the 2024–25 season injured, he ended the season with five U18 goals and two B team appearances, scoring once. After off-season work on his finishing, prolific goalscoring form for the U18 team during the 2025–26 pre-season and early in the regular season led to Boni "stepping up" to the B team squad. He top-scored with 17 B team goals and was part of the squad that finished as 2025–26 Professional U21 Development League regular season champions. At the end of the 2025–26 season, Boni signed a professional contract and was promoted into the B team.

== International career ==
In March 2026, Boni was named in the Benin squad for two friendly matches and he started in both.

== Personal life ==
Boni was born in Milton Keynes to parents from Ivory Coast and Benin. He holds a French passport.

== Career statistics ==
=== International ===
As of match played 31 March 2026

Appearances and goals by national team and year
National team	Year	Apps	Goals
Benin	2026	2	0
Total		2	0
