= Danny Anisjko =

Latvian footballer (born 2006)

Personal information
- Full name: Danny Brian Ambato Anisjko
- Date of birth: 11 January 2006 (age 20)
- Place of birth: England
- Position: Winger

Team information
- Current team: Chesterfield
- Number: 21

Youth career
- 2015–2026: Nottingham Forest

Senior career*
Years	Team	Apps	(Gls)
2026–	Chesterfield	0	(0)

International career^{‡}
2024	Latvia U19	2	(0)
2025–	Latvia U21	5	(0)
- * Club domestic league appearances and goals ‡ National team caps and goals as of 18 November 2025

Danny Braian Ambato Anisjko (Latvian: Dannī Braians Ambato Aņisjko: born 11 January 2006) is a professional footballer who plays as a winger for Chesterfield. Born in England, he is a Latvia youth international.

== Early life ==
Anisjko was born on 11 January 2006. Born in England, he was born to an Ecuadorian mother and a Latvian father.

== Club career ==
As a youth player, Anisjko joined the youth academy of English side Nottingham Forest in 2015. Ahead of the 2022–23 season, he was promoted to the club's under-18 team. Following his release by Forest in June 2026, Anisjko went on trial with Chesterfield and signed a one-year deal with the EFL League Two club on 17 July 2026.

== International career ==
Anisjko is a Latvia youth international. During the autumn of 2024, he played for the Latvia national under-19 football team for 2025 UEFA European Under-19 Championship qualification.

== Style of play ==
Anisjko plays as a winger and is right-footed. Ecuadorian news website El Futbolero Ecuador wrote in 2024 that he has "good ball control, a daring, and skillful style of play".
