= Danny Wilson (rugby) =

Wales international rugby league footballer

Personal information
- Full name: Donald James Wilson
- Born: 4 November 1955 (age 69); Cwmbran, Wales

Playing information

Rugby union
- Position: Fly-half
Club
| Years | Team | Pld | T | G | FG | P |
|---|---|---|---|---|---|---|
| 1976–80 | Cardiff |

Rugby league
- Position: Stand-off
Club
| Years | Team | Pld | T | G | FG | P |
|---|---|---|---|---|---|---|
| 1977 | Widnes | 1 | 0 | 0 | 0 | 0 |
| 1980–88 | Swinton | 180 | 62 | 10 | 39 | 278 |
| 1988–89 | Springfield Borough | 7 | 1 | 0 | 0 | 4 |
| | Total | 188 | 63 | 10 | 39 | 282 |
Representative
| Years | Team | Pld | T | G | FG | P |
| 1981–84 | Wales | 5 | 1 | 1 | 2 | 8 |
- Relatives: Ryan Giggs (son)

Donald James "Danny" Wilson (born 4 November 1955) is a Welsh former rugby union and professional rugby league footballer who played in the 1970s and 1980s. A Wales international stand-off, he played his club rugby for Widnes, Barrow, Swinton, Runcorn Highfield and Springfield Borough.

== Career ==
Born in Wales to a Sierra Leone Creole father and a Welsh mother, Wilson played rugby union for Cardiff RFC as a fly-half. He had trials with several rugby league clubs, including Widnes and Barrow, before eventually moving north to play as a professional with Swinton.

Wilson once scored five drop goals in a match for Swinton in 1983, which is a joint record in British rugby league history.

Wilson won five caps for Wales while at Swinton between 1981 and 1984.

== Family ==
Wilson is the father of former footballer and Wales manager Ryan Giggs, who was christened Ryan Joseph Wilson but as a teenager changed his surname to that of his mother. Giggs is said to have inherited his balance and athleticism from his father.
