= Felix Scott (footballer) =

English footballer

Personal information
- Full name: Felix Scott
- Date of birth: 17 December 2007 (age 18)
- Position: Winger

Team information
- Current team: Sunderland
- Number: 49

Youth career
- Sunderland

Senior career*
Years	Team	Apps	(Gls)
2026–	Sunderland	0	(0)
- * Club domestic league appearances and goals as of 28 October 2026

Felix Scott (born 17 December 2007) is an English professional footballer who plays as a winger for Premier League club Sunderland.

== Club career ==
Scott came through Sunderland's academy, and on 7 April 2025 was part of their scholar intake. On 3 July 2026, he signed his first professional contract with Sunderland. On 28 October 2026, he made his professional debut with SUnderland as a substitute in a 3–2 EFL Cup win over Brentford.
