= Luca Fletcher =

English footballer

Personal information
- Full name: Luca George Murphy Fletcher
- Date of birth: 18 April 2007 (age 19)
- Place of birth: Reading, England
- Position: Striker

Team information
- Current team: Ipswich Town

Youth career
- –2023: Reading
- 2023–: Manchester City
- 2025–: → Ipswich Town

International career^{‡}
Years	Team	Apps	(Gls)
2022–2023	England U16	8	(5)
2023–2024	England U17	12	(1)
- ‡ National team caps and goals as of 00:25, 22 May 2024

Luca George Murphy Fletcher (born 18 April 2007) is an English professional footballer who plays as a striker for Ipswich Town.

== Early life ==
Born in Reading, Fletcher attended school in Croxley Green in Hertfordshire.

== Club career ==
Fletcher won the Reading 'Academy Player of the Season' award at the club's end of season awards in May 2023. In 2023 Fletcher joined the Roc Nation sports agency. With his profile raises by his goal-scoring exploits at junior level interest was reported in Fletcher's services both in England and Scotland. Fletcher reportedly turned down a two-year contract with Reading in June 2023 in order to agree terms with Premier League side Manchester City. In July 2024 Fletcher signed his first professional contract with Manchester City.

On 3 September 2025, Fletcher joined Ipswich Town under-21s on an initial loan deal.

== International career ==
Fletcher scored three goals in two matches for England U-16s against Turkey U-16s in December 2022. In May 2024 he was a member of the England U-17 squad at the 2024 UEFA European Under-17 Championship in Cyprus and made his only appearance of the tournament in their opening group game against France U-17.
