= Tom Proctor (footballer) =

English footballer

Personal information
- Full name: Tom William Proctor
- Date of birth: 19 June 2009 (age 17)
- Place of birth: Sunderland, England
- Position: Attacking midfielder

Team information
- Current team: Sunderland
- Number: 77

Youth career
- 2015–2026: Sunderland

Senior career*
Years	Team	Apps	(Gls)
2026–	Sunderland	1	(0)
- * Club domestic league appearances and goals as of 28 October 2026

Tom William Proctor (born 19 June 2009) is an English professional footballer who plays as an attacking midfielder for Premier League club Sunderland.

== Early life ==
Proctor is the son of Michael Proctor, who was a former footballer for Sunderland.

== Club career ==
Proctor joined the Sunderland academy at the age of six. He was signed as a scholar on 7 July 2025. On 8 September 2026, he debuted with Sunderland as a substitute in a 1–0 EFL Cup win over Hull City.
