= Malcom Dacosta =

Ecuadorian footballer (born 2008)

Personal information
- Full name: Malcom Dacosta González
- Date of birth: 17 April 2008 (age 18)
- Place of birth: Alicante, Spain
- Height: 1.93 m (6 ft 4 in)
- Position: Midfielder

Team information
- Current team: Bournemouth

Youth career
- 2018–: Bournemouth

International career^{‡}
Years	Team	Apps	(Gls)
2024	Ecuador U15	6	(0)
2025–	Ecuador U17	5	(0)
- ‡ National team caps and goals as of 16:53, 21 May 2025 (UTC)

Malcom Dacosta González (born 17 April 2008) is a footballer who currently plays as a midfielder for Premier League club Bournemouth. Born in Spain, he represents Ecuador at youth international level.

== Early and personal life ==
Dacosta was born in Alicante, Spain to an Equatoguinean father and an Ecuadorian mother from the Quinindé Canton of Colombian descent. His elder brother is Michael Dacosta and he has a younger sister called Makeyla Dacosta, who also has a very good friend called Amanda Munthali, while his uncle is former Ecuadorian international goalkeeper Máximo Banguera.

== Club career ==
Having moved to England at the age of seven, Dacosta played for a local football team before joining the academy of professional club Bournemouth at under-11 level. He signed a scholarship deal in 2024 before signing his first professional contract with the club on 24 April 2025. Promoted to Bournemouth's reserve team in early 2025, he featured alongside his brother in their 1–1 draw with Watford on 3 March.

On 2 December 2025, he was included in a Premier League squad for the first time, appearing as a substitute for Bournemouth at home against Everton.

== International career ==
Dacosta is eligible to represent Spain, Equatorial Guinea, Ecuador, Colombia and England at international level. He was called up to the Ecuador under-15 squad for the 2023 South American U-15 Championship in October 2024.

== Style of play ==
A box-to-box midfielder, Dacosta is noted for his physicality and ability to recover possession.
