= Premier League Cup (football) =

- Founded: 2013
- Region: England; Wales
- Current champions: Burnley (1st title)
- Most championships: Eleven teams (1 title each)
- Website: Official website
- 2026–27 Premier League Cup

The Premier League Cup is an English football competition run by the Premier League for under-21 sides.

== History ==
The competition was established in 2013 as the U21 Premier League Cup, an under-21 equivalent of the FA Youth Cup, albeit being run by the Premier League instead of The Football Association. In 2016, the age range of the competition was raised to under-23s, and the competition was renamed as the Premier League Cup.

In 2017, the Premier League introduced the U18 Premier League Cup and U16 Premier League Cup (which was changed to the U17 Premier League Cup in 2020) for their respective age groups.

In 2022, the age limit was changed back to under-21 to match the changes in Premier League 2.

== Winners ==
=== Finals ===
| Year | Winners | Score | Runners-up | Venue | Attendance |
|---|---|---|---|---|---|
| 2013–14 | Reading | 4–3 (Note: Aggregate score over two legs) | Manchester City | Etihad Stadium (first leg); Madejski Stadium (second leg) | 4,873 (first leg); 3,034 (second leg) |
| 2014–15 | Southampton | 2–1 | Blackburn Rovers | Ewood Park (first leg); St Mary's Stadium (second leg) | 995 (first leg); 12,356 (second leg) |
| 2015–16 | West Ham United | 1–1 (Note: West Ham won 5–3 on penalties) | Hull City | Boleyn Ground (first leg); KC Stadium (second leg) | 10,267 (first leg); 3,886 (second leg) |
| 2016–17 | Swansea City | 2–0 | Reading | Liberty Stadium | 2,113 |
| 2017–18 | Aston Villa | 0–0 (Note: Aston Villa won 4–1 on penalties) | Swansea City | Liberty Stadium | |
| 2018–19 | Everton | 1–0 | Newcastle United | Goodison Park | |
| 2019–20 | Cancelled (Note: The season was curtailed with no champion crowned due to the COVID-19 pandemic in the United Kingdom) | | | | |
| 2020–21 | Not held (Note: Not held due to the COVID-19 pandemic in the United Kingdom) | | | | |
| 2021–22 | West Bromwich Albion | 2–2 (Note: West Bromwich won 5–4 on penalties) | Wolverhampton Wanderers | The Hawthorns | 7,530 |
| 2022–23 | Brentford | 2–1 | Blackburn Rovers | Brentford Community Stadium | 2,219 |
| 2023–24 | Fulham | 4–0 | Tottenham Hotspur | Craven Cottage | 3,695 |
| 2024–25 | Queens Park Rangers | 3–1 | Brentford | Loftus Road | 7,845 |
| 2025–26 | Burnley | 2–1 | Sunderland | Stadium of Light | 2,385 |

Notes

Performances by club
| Team | Winners | Runners-up | Years won | Years runner-up |
|---|---|---|---|---|
| Reading | 1 | 1 | 2013–14 | 2016–17 |
| Swansea City | 1 | 1 | 2016–17 | 2017–18 |
| Brentford | 1 | 1 | 2022–23 | 2024–25 |
| Southampton | 1 | 0 | 2014–15 | — |
| West Ham United | 1 | 0 | 2015–16 | — |
| Aston Villa | 1 | 0 | 2017–18 | — |
| Everton | 1 | 0 | 2018–19 | — |
| West Bromwich Albion | 1 | 0 | 2021–22 | — |
| Fulham | 1 | 0 | 2023–24 | — |
| Queens Park Rangers | 1 | 0 | 2024–25 | — |
| Burnley | 1 | 0 | 2025–26 | — |
| Blackburn Rovers | 0 | 2 | — | 2014–15, 2022–23 |
| Manchester City | 0 | 1 | — | 2013–14 |
| Hull City | 0 | 1 | — | 2015–16 |
| Newcastle United | 0 | 1 | — | 2018–19 |
| Wolverhampton Wanderers | 0 | 1 | — | 2021–22 |
| Tottenham Hotspur | 0 | 1 | — | 2023–24 |
| Sunderland | 0 | 1 | — | 2025–26 |

=== U18 finals ===
| Year | Winners | Score | Runners-up | Venue |
|---|---|---|---|---|
| 2017–18 | Chelsea | 2–0 | Tottenham Hotspur | Cobham Training Centre |
| 2018–19 | Manchester City | 1–0 | Middlesbrough | Riverside Stadium |
| 2019–20 | Manchester City | 6–0 | Stoke City | Academy Stadium |
| 2020–21 | Tournament not held due to the COVID-19 pandemic in the United Kingdom | | | |
| 2021–22 | Chelsea | 2–1 | Fulham | Craven Cottage |
| 2022–23 | Tottenham Hotspur | 3–1 | Aston Villa | Villa Park |
| 2023–24 | Manchester United | 2–1 | Manchester City | Leigh Sports Village |
| 2024–25 | West Ham United | 2–1 | Reading | Select Car Leasing Stadium |
| 2025–26 | Crystal Palace | 1–1 (6–5 pen.) | Manchester United | Selhurst Park |

=== U17 finals ===
| Year | Winners | Score | Runners-up | Venue |
|---|---|---|---|---|
| 2020–21 | Brighton & Hove Albion | 2–0 | Middlesbrough | Riverside Stadium |
| 2021–22 | Manchester City | 6–0 | Tottenham Hotspur | Loughborough University |
| 2022–23 | Tottenham Hotspur | 5–1 | Nottingham Forest | City Ground |
| 2023–24 | Chelsea | 3–1 | Wolverhampton Wanderers | Molineux Stadium |
| 2024–25 | Tottenham Hotspur | 5–2 | Charlton Athletic | Broadhall Way |
| 2025–26 | West Ham United | 3–2 | Blackburn Rovers | Crown Ground |

=== U16 finals ===
| Year | Winners | Score | Runners-up | Venue |
|---|---|---|---|---|
| 2017–18 | Manchester City | 2–1 | Chelsea | Cobham Training Centre |
| 2018–19 | Chelsea | 5–2 | Arsenal | Meadow Park |
| 2019–20 | Tournament curtailed with no champion crowned due to the COVID-19 pandemic in the United Kingdom | | | |
| 2023–24 | Leicester City | 2–1 | Manchester City | King Power Stadium |
| 2024–25 | Arsenal | 3–1 | Chelsea | Kingsmeadow |
| 2025–26 | Tottenham Hotspur | 5–3 | Fulham | Craven Cottage |

== See also ==
- Professional Development League
