= Michael Dacosta =

Spanish footballer (born 2005)

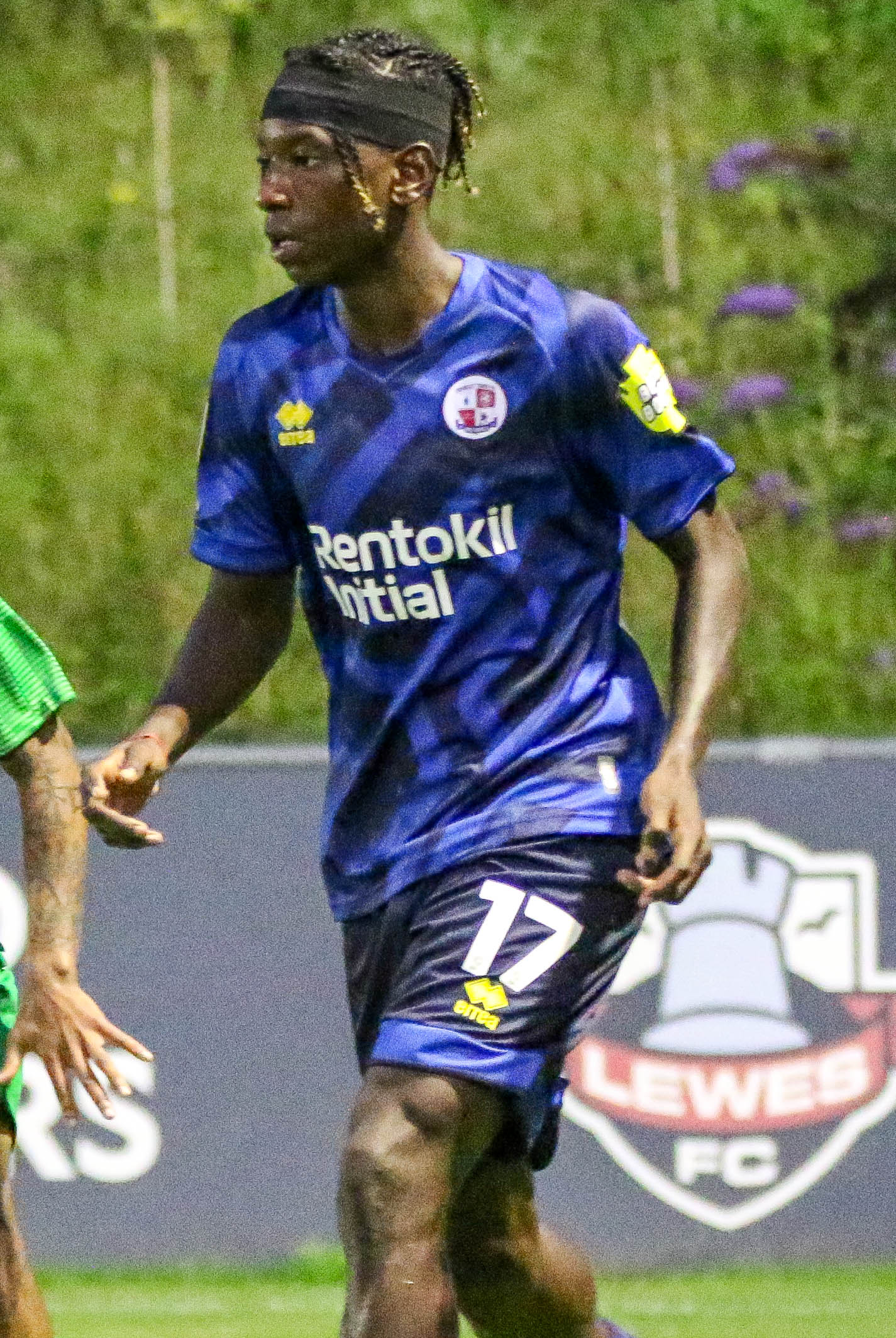
- Dacosta with Crawley Town in 2024

Personal information
- Full name: Michael Dacosta González
- Date of birth: 5 March 2005 (age 21)
- Place of birth: Alicante, Spain
- Height: 1.86 m (6 ft 1 in)
- Position: Winger

Team information
- Current team: Moreirense
- Number: 44

Youth career
- Alicante
- Hércules
- 2016–2024: Bournemouth

Senior career*
Years	Team	Apps	(Gls)
2024–2026	Bournemouth	0	(0)
2024	→ Crawley Town (loan)	0	(0)
2025	→ Hartlepool United (loan)	2	(0)
2026–	Moreirense	1	(0)
- * Club domestic league appearances and goals as of 9 September 2026

Michael Dacosta González (born 5 March 2005) is a Spanish professional footballer who plays as a winger for Primeira Liga club Moreirense.

== Early life ==
Dacosta was born in Alicante, Spain, and began his career in the academy of local side Alicante. At the age of six, he was involved in a traffic accident while riding on the back of his father's motorcycle, suffering a bad injury to his right foot. As this was his stronger foot while playing football, he had to adapt his playing style, learning to favour his left foot instead.

== Club career ==
Following his departure from Alicante, Dacosta joined Hércules, before his parents decided to move to England. They settled in London, and he played for a number of grassroots teams before his family moved again, to Portsmouth. While playing for another grassroots team in Portsmouth, he was offered a trial at professional side Bournemouth, who signed him after four weeks, despite the trial being scheduled for six.

Dacosta settled in to his new team well, notably scoring twice for Bournemouth's under-18s in a 2–0 win over Exeter City in the FA Youth Cup. In the 2022–23 season, he scored fourteen goals for the youth team, earning him a spot on the bench for a Premier League match against Brentford, though he did not feature.

On 10 July 2024, Dacosta joined League One club Crawley Town on a season-long loan deal. His loan contract was terminated on 3 September 2024 after he withdrew from the Crawley Town squad due to injury.

On 26 September 2025, Dacosta joined National League side Hartlepool United on a one-month loan.

It was announced on 15 June 2026 that Dacosta had signed for Portuguese side Moreirense.

== International career ==
Dacosta is eligible to represent Spain through birth, Ecuador and Equatorial Guinea through his mother and father, respectively, Colombia through his maternal grandfather, and England by virtue of living in the country since he was young.

On 29 August 2023, Dacosta was called up to the Spain national under-19 football team.

== Personal life ==
Dacosta's younger brother, Malcom, is also a footballer, and currently also plays in the academy of Bournemouth and a sister called Makeyla Dacosta who is interested in Athletics . His maternal uncle Máximo Banguera won 36 caps for Ecuador.

== Career statistics ==
As of match played 11 October 2025

Appearances and goals by club, season and competition
Club	Season	League			FA Cup		EFL Cup		Other		Total	
Club	Season	Division	Apps	Goals	Apps	Goals	Apps	Goals	Apps	Goals	Apps	Goals
Hartlepool United (loan)	2025–26	National League	2	0	1	0	0	0	0	0	3	0
Career total			2	0	1	0	0	0	0	0	3	0
