= 2024–25 Premier League Cup =

Tournament details
- Country: England; Wales
- Teams: 36

Final positions
- Champions: Queens Park Rangers (1st Title)
- Runners-up: Brentford (1st Runner Up Finish)

Tournament statistics
- Matches played: 123
- Goals scored: 430 (3.5 per match)
- Attendance: 19,811 (161 per match)
- Top goal scorer: (England) Harrison Murphy Queens Park Rangers (8 Goals)

The 2024–25 Premier League Cup was the eleventh edition of the competition.

This year's competition expands to 36 academies with a group stage featuring nine groups of four clubs. Teams face each other twice in the group stage, home and away. All knockout games were one-legged ties. The 9 group winners and the 7 best runners up from the group stages advanced to Knockout Stage of the competition.Fulham were the defending champions beating 4–0 Tottenham Hotspur in last year's final. However, there was a new champion because Fulham did not enter the competition this year after 5 straight seasons in the competition. The runners up from last competition Tottenham Hotspur did not return as well after 1 competition. It was the first time the champions and runners up did not participate in the competition the very next year. Other teams not returning from last year include Aston Villa after 1 season, Crystal Palace after 2 straight seasons, Middlesbrough after 4 straight seasons, Newcastle United 10 straight seasons as a inaugural competitor, and Peterborough United after 2 consecutive seasons. In total, 7 teams from last year's competition did not be play in this season.

Nine teams returned to the competition including Coventry City who did not participate since the inaugural tournament in 2014–15, Preston North End returned for the first time in the group stage portion of the competition since the competition was a single knockout round tournament in 2015–16, Exeter City who returned to the competition for the first time since 2021–22, while Cardiff City, Derby County, Everton, Queens Park Rangers, Southampton, and Watford all return after having missed out on last years competition. Two teams competed for the first time; Bromley and Stockport County.

== Participants ==
=== Category 1 ===
- Blackburn Rovers
- Brighton & Hove Albion
- Chelsea
- Derby County
- Everton
- Leeds United
- Leicester City
- Norwich City
- Nottingham Forest
- Reading
- Southampton
- Sunderland
- West Bromwich Albion
- Wolverhampton Wanderers

=== Category 2 ===
- AFC Bournemouth
- Birmingham City
- Brentford
- Bristol City
- Burnley
- Cardiff City
- Charlton Athletic
- Coventry City
- Colchester United
- Fleetwood Town
- Hull City
- Ipswich Town
- Queens Park Rangers
- Sheffield United
- Swansea City
- Watford

=== Category 3 ===
- Exeter City
- Huddersfield Town
- Luton Town
- Preston North End
- Stockport County

=== Category 4 ===
- Bromley

== Group stage ==
=== Group A ===
| Team | Pld | W | D | L | GF | GA | GD | Pts |
|---|---|---|---|---|---|---|---|---|
| Exeter City (Q) | 6 | 5 | 1 | 0 | 14 | 6 | +8 | 16 |
| Bromley (E) | 6 | 3 | 0 | 3 | 10 | 11 | −1 | 9 |
| Bristol City (E) | 6 | 1 | 3 | 2 | 8 | 9 | −1 | 6 |
| Norwich City (E) | 6 | 0 | 2 | 4 | 6 | 12 | −6 | 2 |

Updated to match(es) played on 3 February 2025. Source:
(E) Eliminated; (Q) Qualified for the phase indicated

| 27 August 2024 | Bromley | 1–4 | Exeter City | Bromley |
| 19:00 | Kelmendi 40' | Report | Cummins 45'; Dean 56'; Cutler 64'; Borges 67' | Stadium: Hayes Lane; Attendance: 155; Referee: Andrew Humphries |

| 11 September 2024 | Exeter City | 2–1 | Norwich City | Exeter |
| 19:00 | Tomkinson 52' (o.g.); Cutler 90' | Report | Welch 88' | Stadium: St James Park; Attendance: 318; Referee: Elliott Swallow |

| 16 September 2024 | Bristol City | 2–0 | Bromley | Failand |
| 13:00 | Backwell 60'; Bak 90' | Report | | Stadium: Robins High Performance Centre; Attendance: 153; Referee: Elliott Swallow |

| 17 October 2024 | Norwich City | 1–1 | Bristol City | Colney |
| 13:00 | Mundle-Smith 47' | Report | Araoye 6' | Stadium: Avant Training Centre; Attendance: 106; Referee: James Oldham |

| 8 November 2024 | Bromley | 3–2 | Norwich City | Bromley |
| 13:00 | Paye 67', 84'; Nouble 90+1' | Report | Okwumo 8'; Ogwuru 53' | Stadium: Hayes Lane; Attendance: 250; Referee: Sam Mulhall |

| 11 November 2024 | Bristol City | 0–2 | Exeter City | Failand |
| 19:00 | | Report | Cox 31'; Dean 33' | Stadium: Robins High Performance Centre; Attendance: 241; Referee: Jason Richardson |

| 20 November 2024 | Norwich City | 0–1 | Exeter City | Colney |
| 19:00 | | | Dean 90+5' | Stadium: Avant Training Centre; Referee: Ruebyn Ricardo |

| 22 November 2024 | Bromley | 2–0 | Bristol City | Bromley |
| 19:00 | Corbin 9'; Deh 24' | | | Stadium: Hayes Lane; Referee: Andrew Humphries |

| 25 November 2024 | Bristol City | 2–2 | Norwich City | Failand |
| 13:00 | Rose 21'; Stokes 70' (pen.) | | Ogwuru 67'; Djedje 87' | Stadium: Robins High Performance Centre; Referee: Richard Aspinall |

| 18 December 2024 | Exeter City | 3–1 | Bromley | Exeter |
| 19:00 | A. Richards 9', 83'; Cox 90+4' | | Morgan 33' (pen.) | Stadium: St James Park; Attendance: 180; Referee: James Durkin |

| 3 February 2025 | Exeter City | 2–2 | Bristol City | Exeter |
| 13:00 | Bird 2'; Oakes 62' | Report | Churchley 11'; Thomas 17' | Stadium: St James Park; Attendance: 206; Referee: Ross Martin |

| 3 February 2025 | Norwich City | 0–3 | Bromley | Colney |
| 13:00 | | | Tobin 16'; Ibrahimi 25'; Evans 60' | Stadium: Avant Training Centre; Referee: William Davis |

=== Group B ===
| Team | Pld | W | D | L | GF | GA | GD | Pts |
|---|---|---|---|---|---|---|---|---|
| Nottingham Forest (Q) | 6 | 4 | 1 | 1 | 11 | 4 | +7 | 13 |
| Leicester City (Q) | 6 | 3 | 1 | 2 | 9 | 7 | +2 | 10 |
| Hull City (E) | 6 | 2 | 0 | 4 | 7 | 9 | −2 | 6 |
| Coventry City (E) | 6 | 1 | 2 | 3 | 4 | 11 | −7 | 5 |

Updated to match(es) played on 3 February 2025. Source:
(E) Eliminated; (Q) Qualified for the phase indicated

| 6 September 2024 | Hull City | 0–1 | Leicester City | North Ferriby |
| 13:00 | | | Evans 38' | Stadium: Dransfield Stadium; Attendance: 150; Referee: Gareth Rhodes |

| 20 September 2024 | Coventry City | 2–1 | Hull City | Leamington Spa |
| 13:00 | Tavares 61'; Dausch 68' | Report | Brown 66' | Stadium: Your Co-op Community Stadium; Attendance: 92; Referee: Paul Johnson |

| 21 October 2024 | Leicester City | 1–2 | Nottingham Forest | Seagrave |
| 13:00 | Joseph 58' | | Lindsay 30' (o.g.); Thompson 78' | Stadium: LCFC Training Ground; Referee: Andrew Humphries |

| 25 October 2024 | Nottingham Forest | 2–0 | Coventry City | Loughborough |
| 13:00 | Whitehall 46'; Fletcher 65' | | | Stadium: Loughborough University Stadium; Referee: Will Finnie |

| 8 November 2024 | Coventry City | 2–2 | Leicester City | Leamington Spa |
| 13:00 | Finney 15'; Dausch 50' (pen.) | Report | Godsmark-Ford 31'; King 90' | Stadium: Your Co-op Community Stadium; Attendance: 243; Referee: Aaron Farmer |

| 8 November 2024 | Nottingham Forest | 5–1 | Hull City | Loughborough |
| 13:00 | Hammond 14'; McAdam 20'; Nadin 22', 47'; Gardner 24' | Report | Sellars-Fleming 16' | Stadium: Loughborough University Stadium; Attendance: 121; Referee: William Davis |

| 22 November 2024 | Leicester City | 0–2 | Hull City | Seagrave |
| 13:00 | | Report | Vaughan 23'; Brown 55' | Stadium: LCFC Training Ground; Attendance: 266; Referee: Aaron Jackson |

| 25 November 2024 | Coventry City | 0–0 | Nottingham Forest | Leamington Spa |
| 13:00 | | | | Stadium: Your Co-op Community Stadium; Referee: Jason Richardson |

| 5 December 2024 | Nottingham Forest | 1–2 | Leicester City | Loughborough |
| 13:00 | Fletcher 17' | Report | Cartwright 21' (pen.); Monga 73' | Stadium: Loughborough University Stadium; Attendance: 337; Referee: Abigail Byrne |

| 29 January 2025 | Hull City | 0–1 | Nottingham Forest | York |
| 13:00 | | | Sinclair 76' | Stadium: LNER Community Stadium; Referee: Scott Jackson |

| 31 January 2025 | Leicester City | 3–0 | Coventry City | Seagrave |
| 13:00 | King 6'; Monga 42'; Bull 62' | Report | | Stadium: LCFC Training Ground; Attendance: 278; Referee: Harrison Blair |

| 3 February 2025 | Hull City | 3–0 | Coventry City | York |
| 13:00 | Harriman-Annous 33', 74'; Shehu 37' | | | Stadium: LNER Community Stadium; Referee: Callum Walchester |

=== Group C ===
| Team | Pld | W | D | L | GF | GA | GD | Pts |
|---|---|---|---|---|---|---|---|---|
| West Bromwich Albion (A) | 6 | 2 | 3 | 1 | 12 | 9 | +3 | 9 |
| Southampton (A) | 6 | 2 | 3 | 1 | 12 | 10 | +2 | 9 |
| Swansea City (E) | 6 | 2 | 2 | 2 | 14 | 9 | +5 | 8 |
| Fleetwood Town (E) | 6 | 2 | 0 | 4 | 8 | 18 | −10 | 6 |

Updated to match(es) played on 31 January 2025. Source:
(A) Advance to a further round; (E) Eliminated

| 13 September 2024 | West Bromwich Albion | 2–2 | Southampton | Solihull |
| 13:00 | Deeming 16'; Mandey 90+1' | | Ehibhatiomhan 45+2', 79' (pen.) | Stadium: ARMCO Arena; Referee: Richard Aspinall |

| 15 September 2024 | Fleetwood Town | 0–6 | Swansea City | Clitheroe |
| 13:00 | | Report | Dabrowski 13'; Lloyd 24', 83'; Nzingo 61'; Wilson 76', 78' | Stadium: EcoGiants Stadium; Attendance: 100; Referee: Jamie O'Connor |

| 17 October 2024 | West Bromwich Albion | 1–2 | Swansea City | West Bromwich |
| 13:00 | Bostock 75' | | Diomande 11' (o.g.); Govea 90+3' | Stadium: The Hawthorns; Referee: Thomas Bramall |

| 18 October 2024 | Southampton | 4–1 | Fleetwood Town | Marchwood |
| 9:00 | Robinson 7'; O'Brien-Whitmarsh 45+19'; Merry 90+3'; Ehibhatiomhan 90+5' | Report | McLean 45+1' | Stadium: Staplewood Training Ground; Attendance: 37; Referee: Jason Richardson |

| 8 November 2024 | Swansea City | 1–2 | Southampton | Landore |
| 13:00 | Govea 90+2' | | Dipepa 35'; Akachukwu 64' | Stadium: Landore Training Centre; Referee: Aaron Jackson |

| 10 November 2024 | Fleetwood Town | 2–3 | West Bromwich Albion | Clitheroe |
| 7:00 | Devonport 42', 90+4' | Report | Whitwell 13'; Crother 72'; Sule 90' | Stadium: EcoGiants Stadium; Attendance: 55; Referee: James Bancroft |

| 22 November 2024 | Southampton | 2–2 | West Bromwich Albion | Marchwood |
| 13:00 | Sesay 87'; Dipepa 90+3' (pen.) | | Sule 57'; Humphries 73' | Stadium: Staplewood Training Ground; Referee: Callum Walchester |

| 22 November 2024 | Swansea City | 2–3 | Fleetwood Town | Landore |
| 13:00 | Henia-Kamau 21'; Nzingo 71' | Report | Devonport 35'; Wilkinson 41'; Thompson 49' | Stadium: Landore Training Centre; Attendance: 100; Referee: Aaron Farmer |

| 6 December 2024 | Swansea City | 1–1 | West Bromwich Albion | Landore |
| 13:00 | Henia-Kamau 90+7' | | Higgins 86' (pen.) | Stadium: Landore Training Centre; Referee: Oliver Mackey |

| 31 January 2025 | Southampton | 2–2 | Swansea City | Marchwood |
| 13:00 | Robinson 8'; Akachukwu 24' | | Woodward 33'; Henia-Kamau 50' | Stadium: Staplewood Training Ground; Referee: Aaron Farmer |

| 31 January 2025 | West Bromwich Albion | 3–0 | Fleetwood Town | Solihull |
| 13:00 | Sule 7'; Mandey 11'; Parker 75' | Report | | Stadium: ARMCO Arena; Attendance: 104; Referee: Dale Baines |

| 4 February 2025 | Fleetwood Town | 2–0 | Southampton | Clitheroe |
| 13:00 | Hughes 54'; Roberts 72' | | | Stadium: EcoGiants Stadium; Referee: Dean Watson |

=== Group D ===
| Team | Pld | W | D | L | GF | GA | GD | Pts |
|---|---|---|---|---|---|---|---|---|
| Sheffield United (Q) | 6 | 5 | 0 | 1 | 17 | 7 | +10 | 15 |
| Sunderland (Q) | 6 | 3 | 1 | 2 | 15 | 7 | +8 | 10 |
| Wolverhampton Wanderers (E) | 6 | 2 | 1 | 3 | 8 | 9 | −1 | 7 |
| Huddersfield Town (E) | 6 | 1 | 0 | 5 | 7 | 24 | −17 | 3 |

Updated to match(es) played on 11 February 2025. Source:
(E) Eliminated; (Q) Qualified for the phase indicated

| 6 September 2024 | Sunderland | 0–1 | Sheffield United | Hetton-le-Hole |
| 13:00 | | | Crompton 50' (o.g.) | Stadium: Eppleton Colliery Welfare Ground; Attendance: 628; Referee: Jamie O'Connor |

| 12 September 2024 | Wolverhampton Wanderers | 4–0 | Huddersfield Town | Wellington |
| 13:45 | Carson 2'; Holman 23'; Whittingham 66'; Farmer 72' | Report | | Stadium: New Buck's Head; Attendance: 167; Referee: Andrew Humphries |

| 17 September 2024 | Sheffield United | 3–0 | Wolverhampton Wanderers | York |
| 13:00 | Hampson 45+1'; Marsh 47', 84' | Report | | Stadium: LNER Community Stadium; Attendance: 125; Referee: Steven Copeland |

| 15 October 2024 | Huddersfield Town | 2–3 | Sunderland | Huddersfield |
| | Abbott 28'; Falls 53' | Report | Connolly 5', 73'; Watson 37' | Stadium: John Smith's Stadium; Attendance: 202; Referee: Michael Barlow |

| 21 October 2024 | Sunderland | 2–0 | Wolverhampton Wanderers | Hetton-le-Hole |
| 13:00 | Burke 43'; Ba 90' | Report | | Stadium: Eppleton Colliery Welfare Ground; Attendance: 383; Referee: Benjamin Wyatt |

| 11 November 2024 | Sheffield United | 7–2 | Huddersfield Town | York |
| 13:00 | Marsh 6' (pen.), 37', 49'; Blacker 56'; Beattie 65'; Davies 72'; Francis 79' | | Philpott 24'; Ruffels 55' | Stadium: LNER Community Stadium; Referee: Paul Cooper |

| 25 November 2024 | Huddersfield Town | 0–1 | Wolverhampton Wanderers | Huddersfield |
| 13:00 | | Report | Holman 5' | Stadium: John Smith's Stadium; Attendance: 130; Referee: Jamie O'Connor |

| 25 November 2024 | Sheffield United | 2–1 | Sunderland | York |
| 13:00 | Beattie 76'; Tahir 82' | | Jones 16' | Stadium: LNER Community Stadium; Referee: Scott Jackson |

| 14 January 2025 | Wolverhampton Wanderers | 1–2 | Sheffield United | Kidderminster |
| 13:00 | Chiwome 46' | | Atherton 7'; Aston 65' | Stadium: Aggborough Stadium; Referee: Ross Martin |

| 31 January 2025 | Huddersfield Town | 3–2 | Sheffield United | Huddersfield |
| 13:00 | Ladapo 6', 33'; Falls 20' | | Reid 23'; Okyere 67' | Stadium: John Smith's Stadium; Attendance: 150; Referee: Paul Cooper |

| 3 February 2025 | Wolverhampton Wanderers | 2–2 | Sunderland | Kidderminster |
| 13:00 | Whittingham 29'; Ángel 65' | | Garagusaan 1', 81' | Stadium: Aggborough Stadium; Referee: Jamie O'Connor |

| 11 February 2025 | Sunderland | 7–0 | Huddersfield Town | Hetton-le-Hole |
| 13:00 | Abdullahi 9' (pen.), 26', 59'; Jones 28'; Gregory 58' (o.g.); Whitaker 78'; Middlemas 88' | Report | | Stadium: Eppleton Colliery Welfare Ground; Attendance: 256; Referee: Aaron Jackson |
Note: Match was originally going to be played 13 January 2025 but was postponed due to a frozen pitch.

=== Group E ===
| Team | Pld | W | D | L | GF | GA | GD | Pts |
|---|---|---|---|---|---|---|---|---|
| Queens Park Rangers (Q) | 6 | 3 | 1 | 2 | 12 | 5 | +7 | 10 |
| Blackburn Rovers (A) | 6 | 2 | 3 | 1 | 10 | 9 | +1 | 9 |
| Colchester United (E) | 6 | 2 | 2 | 2 | 7 | 7 | 0 | 8 |
| Preston North End (E) | 6 | 1 | 2 | 3 | 9 | 17 | −8 | 5 |

Updated to match(es) played on 10 February 2025. Source:
(A) Advance to a further round; (E) Eliminated; (Q) Qualified for the phase indicated

| 3 September 2024 | Blackburn Rovers | 2–1 | Colchester United | Leyland |
| 13:00 | Bloxham 55'; Edmondson 68' | | Terry 76' | Stadium: Lancashire FA County Ground; Attendance: 152; Referee: William Davis |

| 13 September 2024 | Queens Park Rangers | 7–1 | Preston North End | Hayes |
| 13:00 | Sutton 6'; Redhead 23', 52', 57'; Murphy 68', 77', 90+3' | Report | Best 19' | Stadium: SKyEx Community Stadium; Attendance: 237; Referee: Aaron Farmer |

| 22 October 2024 | Colchester United | 1–1 | Queens Park Rangers | Maldon |
| 13:00 | B Trialist 32' | | Kolli 64' | Stadium: Wallace Binder; Referee: Dale Baines |

| 5 November 2024 | Preston North End | 2–1 | Colchester United | Chorley |
| 13:00 | Rodríguez-Gentile 39'; Wilson 87' | Report | Green 45+1' | Stadium: Victory Park; Attendance: 92; Referee: Michael Barlow |

| 22 November 2024 | Colchester United | 1–1 | Blackburn Rovers | Maldon |
| 13:00 | Sassi 39' | | Murphy-Worrell 9' | Stadium: Wallace Binder; Referee: Richard Eley |

| 25 November 2024 | Preston North End | 0–2 | Queens Park Rangers | Chorley |
| 13:00 | | | Murphy 67' (pen.); Hassan 81' | Stadium: Victory Park; Referee: John Mulligan |

| 2 December 2024 | Blackburn Rovers | 4–4 | Preston North End | Leyland |
| 13:00 | O'Grady-Macken 1'; Higgins 47'; Stritch 51', 82' | Report | Taylor 29', 38'; Wilson 54'; Stewart 87' | Stadium: Lancashire FA County Ground; Attendance: 208; Referee: Aaron Bannister |

| 10 December 2024 | Queens Park Rangers | 0–1 | Colchester United | Hayes |
| 13:00 | | | Green 90' | Stadium: SKyEx Community Stadium; Referee: Robert Massey-Ellis |

| 19 December 2024 | Queens Park Rangers | 2–1 | Blackburn Rovers | Hayes |
| 13:00 | Coomes 54'; Murphy 73' | | Leonard 19' (pen.) | Stadium: SKyEx Community Stadium; Referee: Stephen Parkinson |

| 7 January 2025 | Preston North End | 1–1 | Blackburn Rovers | Bamber Bridge |
| 13:00 | Evans 59' | | Wood 17' | Stadium: Sir Tom Finney Stadium; Referee: Richard Aspinall |
Note: Match was originally going to be played on 30 September 2024, but was postponed.

| 31 January 2025 | Colchester United | 2–1 | Preston North End | Maldon |
| 13:00 | Sandah 42'; Drysdale 89' | | Brindle 71' (pen.) | Stadium: Wallace Binder; Referee: Paul Johnson |

| 10 February 2025 | Blackburn Rovers | 1–0 | Queens Park Rangers | Leyland |
| 13:00 | Boggan 89' | Report | | Stadium: Lancashire FA County Ground; Attendance: 120; Referee: Steven Copeland |
Note: match was originally going to be played 31 January 2025 but was postponed ue to weather.

=== Group F ===
| Team | Pld | W | D | L | GF | GA | GD | Pts |
|---|---|---|---|---|---|---|---|---|
| Cardiff City (A) | 6 | 3 | 2 | 1 | 12 | 9 | +3 | 11 |
| Ipswich Town (A) | 6 | 2 | 3 | 1 | 11 | 9 | +2 | 9 |
| Everton (E) | 6 | 1 | 3 | 2 | 9 | 10 | −1 | 6 |
| Watford (E) | 6 | 2 | 0 | 4 | 7 | 11 | −4 | 6 |

Updated to match(es) played on 4 February 2025. Source:
(A) Advance to a further round; (E) Eliminated

| 13 September 2024 | Everton | 2–1 | Watford | Walton Hall Park |
| 13:00 | Foster 90+1'; Beaumont-Clark 90+5' | Report | Watkiss 62' | Stadium: Walton Hall Park; Attendance: 210; Referee: John Mulligan |

| 13 September 2024 | Ipswich Town | 2–2 | Cardiff City | Needham Market |
| 13:00 | Taylor 40' (pen.); Turner 81' | Report | Twose 22'; George 30' | Stadium: Ecologic Stadium at Bloomfields; Attendance: 50; Referee: Matthew Russell |

| 26 September 2024 | Ipswich Town | 3–3 | Everton | Needham Market |
| | Boatswain 33', 59'; Mendel-Idowu 42' | | Sherif 12', 58'; Beaumont-Clark 40' | Stadium: Ecologic Stadium at Bloomfields; Referee: Stephen Parkinson |

| 17 October 2024 | Watford | 0–2 | Cardiff City | Kings Langley |
| 13:00 | | | Mafico 35'; Jefferies 45+3' | Stadium: The Orbital Fastener Stadium; Referee: Callum Walchester |

| 8 November 2024 | Everton | 2–2 | Cardiff City | Liverpool |
| 13:00 | Butterfield 2'; Whitaker 67' | | Wigley 78'; George 85' | Stadium: Walton Hall Park; Referee: James Oldham |

| 9 November 2024 | Watford | 2–0 | Ipswich Town | Shenley |
| 9:00 | Lawson 13', 47' | Report | | Stadium: University College London; Attendance: 70; Referee: Ross Martin |

| 23 November 2024 | Cardiff City | 0–2 | Ipswich Town | Leckwith |
| 7:00 | | | Taylor 3'; Mažionis 86' | Stadium: Cardiff International Sports Stadium; Referee: Robert Massey-Ellis |

| 25 November 2024 | Watford | 1–0 | Everton | Kings Langley |
| 13:00 | Eames 68' | Report | | Stadium: The Orbital Fastener Stadium; Attendance: 175; Referee: Callum Walchester |

| 6 December 2024 | Everton | 0–0 | Ipswich Town | Walton Hall Park |
| 13:00 | | | | Stadium: Walton Hall Park; Referee: Declan Brown |

| 19 December 2024 | Cardiff City | 3–1 | Watford | Leckwith |
| 13:00 | Jefferies 35'; Wigley 47'; Barton 57' | | Almeida 55' | Stadium: Cardiff International Sports Stadium; Referee: Richard Eley |

| 1 February 2025 | Cardiff City | 3–2 | Everton | Leckwith |
| 6:00 | Šimić 20'; Pearce 69'; Jefferies 72' | Report | Ebere 9' (pen.); Bates 27' | Stadium: Cardiff International Sports Stadium; Attendance: 250; Referee: Niall Smith |

| 4 February 2025 | Ipswich Town | 4–2 | Watford | Rushmere St Andrew |
| 13:00 | Mendel-Idowu 9', 86'; Turner 25'; Taylor 67' | | Fraser-Grante 10'; Okosun 81' | Stadium: Playford Road; Referee: Ruebyn Ricardo |

=== Group G ===
| Team | Pld | W | D | L | GF | GA | GD | Pts |
|---|---|---|---|---|---|---|---|---|
| Burnley (Q) | 6 | 5 | 1 | 0 | 18 | 3 | +15 | 16 |
| Luton Town (Q) | 6 | 3 | 1 | 2 | 10 | 13 | −3 | 10 |
| Brighton & Hove Albion (E) | 6 | 2 | 1 | 3 | 8 | 9 | −1 | 7 |
| Reading (E) | 6 | 0 | 1 | 5 | 7 | 18 | −11 | 1 |

Updated to match(es) played on 4 February 2025. Source:
(E) Eliminated; (Q) Qualified for the phase indicated

| 13 September 2024 | Brighton & Hove Albion | 4–0 | Reading | Lancing |
| 13:30 | Peupion 51', 73', 77'; Howell 82' | Report | | Stadium: The Amex Elite Football Performance Centre; Attendance: 163; Referee: Jason Richardson |

| 4 October 2024 | Luton Town | 1–4 | Burnley | Luton |
| 13:00 | Kayibanda 90+4' | Report | Westley 5', 58'; Ryan 22'; Bauress 90+2' | Stadium: Kenilworth Road; Attendance: 349; Referee: Andrew Humphries |

| 12 October 2024 | Burnley | 2–0 | Brighton & Hove Albion | Burnley |
| 9:00 | Tweedy 23'; Simmonds 62' (o.g.) | Report | | Stadium: Turf Moor; Attendance: 782; Referee: James Bancroft |

| 21 October 2024 | Reading | 1–2 | Luton Town | Reading |
| 13:00 | Rushesha 61' | Report | Giwa 48'; Takawira 90+7' | Stadium: Select Car Leasing Stadium; Attendance: 182; Referee: James Oldham |

| 8 November 2024 | Brighton & Hove Albion | 1–2 | Luton Town | Lancing |
| 13:00 | Ifill 88' | Report | Pinnington 4'; Nelson 31' (pen.) | Stadium: The Amex Elite Football Performance Centre; Attendance: 200; Referee: Neil Hair |

| 8 November 2024 | Reading | 1–3 | Burnley | Reading |
| 13:00 | Barough 34' | Report | Campbell 20'; Tweedy 22'; Westley 78' | Stadium: Select Car Leasing Stadium; Attendance: 189; Referee: Andrew Humphries |

| 20 November 2024 | Reading | 2–3 | Brighton & Hove Albion | Aldershot |
| 13:00 | Wellens 9'; Stickland 51' | | Mullins 25' (pen.); Flower 32'; Howell 82' | Stadium: The EBB Stadium at The Recreation Ground; Referee: Alan Young |

| 22 November 2024 | Burnley | 5–0 | Luton Town | Leyland |
| 13:00 | McDermott 12'; Pye 25'; Tweedy 29'; Ryan 40'; Ly 86' | Report | | Stadium: Lancashire FA County Ground; Attendance: 103; Referee: Dale Baines |

| 7 December 2024 | Brighton & Hove Albion | 0–0 | Burnley | Lancing |
| 10:00 | | Report | | Stadium: The Amex Elite Football Performance Centre; Referee: Stephen Parkinson |

| 24 January 2025 | Luton Town | 2–2 | Reading | St. Alban's |
| 13:00 | Phillips 51'; Harris 56' | | Sackey 61', 90' | Stadium: Clarence Park; Referee: Ross Martin |
Note: match was originally going to be played 6 January 2025 but was postponed due to a waterlogged pitch.

| 4 February 2025 | Luton Town | 3–0 | Brighton & Hove Albion | St. Alban's |
| 13:00 | Stitt 60'; Phillips 83'; Xavier-Jones 90+7' | Report | | Stadium: Clarence Park; Attendance: 235; Referee: Kirsty Dowle |

| 4 February 2025 | Burnley | 4–1 | Reading | Leyland |
| 13:00 | Mendes 3'; Ryan 45+1', 90+2'; Campbell 79' | | Senga 9' | Stadium: Lancashire FA County Ground; Referee: James Bancroft |

=== Group H ===
| Team | Pld | W | D | L | GF | GA | GD | Pts |
|---|---|---|---|---|---|---|---|---|
| Charlton Athletic (A) | 6 | 4 | 2 | 0 | 17 | 6 | +11 | 14 |
| Stockport County (E) | 6 | 3 | 0 | 3 | 15 | 15 | 0 | 9 |
| Leeds United (E) | 6 | 2 | 1 | 3 | 11 | 12 | −1 | 7 |
| Birmingham City (E) | 6 | 1 | 1 | 4 | 8 | 18 | −10 | 4 |

Updated to match(es) played on 11 February 2025. Source:
(A) Advance to a further round; (E) Eliminated

| 11 September 2024 | Stockport County | 4–1 | Birmingham City | Edgeley |
| 13:00 | Hillary 48'; Kouam 75'; Johnson 80'; Okeke 89' | Report | Wodskou 59' | Stadium: Edgeley Park; Attendance: 155; Referee: Stuart Morland |

| 13 September 2024 | Charlton Athletic | 1–1 | Leeds United | Charlton |
| 13:00 | Huke 13' | Report | Thomas 4' | Stadium: The Valley; Attendance: 317; Referee: Stephen Parkinson |

| 21 October 2024 | Leeds United | 3–1 | Stockport County | York |
| 13:00 | Chadwick 64'; Lopata-White 67'; Richards 74' | | Adshead 57' | Stadium: LNER Community Stadium; Referee: Thomas Bramall |

| 10 November 2024 | Stockport County | 0–2 | Charlton Athletic | Curzon Ashton |
| 14:00 | | Report | Fullah 54', 90+1' | Stadium: Tameside Stadium; Attendance: 200; Referee: Paul Marsden |

| 11 November 2024 | Birmingham City | 3–2 | Leeds United | Stratford-upon-Avon |
| 13:00 | Tattum 32', 58'; Mazwi 65' | | Chadwick 80'; Douglas 87' | Stadium: The Arden Garages Stadium; Referee: Callum Walchester |

| 17 December 2024 | Charlton Athletic | 2–2 | Birmingham City | Dartford |
| 13:00 | Enslin 55'; Fullah 90+2' | | Ellis 23'; Kamara 45+3' | Stadium: Princes Park; Referee: Alan Dale |

| 17 December 2024 | Stockport County | 4–2 | Leeds United | Curzon Ashton |
| 13:00 | Mahady 27' (o.g.); Monteiro 61' (o.g.); Kouam 68', 70' | | Chambers 45+1'; Snowdon 49' | Stadium: Tameside Stadium; Referee: Michael Barlow |

| 4 January 2025 | Leeds United | 0–3 | Charlton Athletic | York |
| 6:00 | | | Hobden 12'; Rylah 42'; Dixon 50' | Stadium: LNER Community Stadium; Referee: Callum Jones |
Note: Match was originally to be played on 22 November 2024, but was postponed due to a frozen pitch.

| 20 January 2025 | Birmingham City | 1–3 | Charlton Athletic | Stratford-upon-Avon |
| 13:00 | Wynne 60' | | Huke 20', 57'; Dixon 46' | Stadium: The Arden Garages Stadium; Referee: Jamie O'Connor |
Note: match was originally to be played on October 8, 2024 but was postponed.

| 31 January 2025 | Leeds United | 3–0 | Birmingham City | York |
| 13:00 | Monteiro 35'; Douglas 57'; Gray 74' | Report | | Stadium: LNER Community Stadium; Attendance: 81; Referee: Declan Brown |

| 4 February 2025 | Charlton Athletic | 6–2 | Stockport County | Dartford |
| 13:00 | Bower 24'; Mapengu 54' (o.g.); Enslin 59'; Hobden 72'; Laqeretabua 80'; Reid 84' | Report | Gardner 14'; Kouam 22' | Stadium: Princes Park; Attendance: 82; Referee: Isaac Searle |

| 11 February 2025 | Birmingham City | 1–4 | Stockport County | Birmingham |
| 7:00 | Havenhand 86' | | Gardner 18'; Kouam 22', 90'; Hillary 80' | Stadium: The Knighthead Training and Academy Grounds; Referee: Aaron Jackson |
Note: Match was originally going to be played on 22 November 2024 but was postponed due to a frozen pitch, and then was moved again from 7 January 2025 to another frozen pitch.

=== Group I ===
| Team | Pld | W | D | L | GF | GA | GD | Pts |
|---|---|---|---|---|---|---|---|---|
| Chelsea (A) | 6 | 4 | 1 | 1 | 19 | 12 | +7 | 13 |
| Brentford (A) | 6 | 3 | 1 | 2 | 14 | 12 | +2 | 10 |
| Derby County (E) | 6 | 3 | 0 | 3 | 12 | 12 | 0 | 9 |
| AFC Bournemouth (E) | 6 | 1 | 0 | 5 | 7 | 16 | −9 | 3 |

Updated to match(es) played on 27 January 2025. Source:
(A) Advance to a further round; (E) Eliminated

| 13 September 2024 | Derby County | 2–3 | AFC Bournemouth | Alfreton |
| 13:00 | Perry 32'; Robinson 36' | Report | Clarke 3'; Kinsey-Wellings 51'; Mottoh 59' | Stadium: The Impact Arena; Attendance: 159; Referee: Dale Baines |

| 15 September 2024 | Chelsea | 6–3 | Brentford | Kingston upon Thames |
| 12:00 | Washington 11'; George 48', 54', 83'; Headman 59', 77' (o.g.) | Report | Hay 10', 42'; Holland 66' | Stadium: Kingsmeadow; Attendance: 516; Referee: Callum Walchester |

| 21 October 2024 | AFC Bournemouth | 1–4 | Chelsea | Wimborne |
| 13:00 | Stuttle 88' | | Vale 14'; Hughes 53'; Washington 80' (pen.), 90+3' | Stadium: New Cuthbury; Referee: Ruebyn Ricardo |

| 21 October 2024 | Brentford | 0–1 | Derby County | Staines-upon-Thames |
| 13:00 | | Report | McAndrew 60' | Stadium: Wheatsheaf Park; Attendance: 400; Referee: Sam Mulhall |

| 8 November 2024 | Derby County | 4–3 | Chelsea | Matlock |
| 13:00 | Osong 16'; Davidson 49'; Wheeldon 63'; Allen 70' | Report | Vale 26', 33'; Washington 30' | Stadium: The Proctor Cars Stadium; Attendance: 700; Referee: Andrew Miller |

| 9 November 2024 | Brentford | 2–1 | AFC Bournemouth | Staines-upon-Thames |
| 6:00 | Morgan 28'; Hay 36' | | Stuttle 72' | Stadium: Wheatsheaf Park; Referee: Alan Dale |

| 6 December 2024 | Derby County | 1–4 | Brentford | Matlock |
| 13:00 | Eames 85' | Report | Brierley 4', 43', 75' (pen.); Holland 87' | Stadium: The Proctor Cars Stadium; Attendance: 204; Referee: Greg Rollason |

| 21 December 2024 | Chelsea | 2–1 | AFC Bournemouth | Kingston-upon-Thames |
| 6:00 | Dyer 51'; Runham 90+1' | | Tydeman 13' | Stadium: Kingsmeadow; Referee: Aaron Farmer |

| 21 January 2025 | AFC Bournemouth | 1–3 | Brentford | Wimborne |
| 13:00 | Mottoh 81' | | Morgan 24'; Lisbie 52', 73' | Stadium: New Cuthbury; Referee: Wayne Cartmel |

| 24 January 2025 | AFC Bournemouth | 0–3 | Derby County | Wimborne |
| 13:00 | | | Wheeldon 25', 46'; Green 88' (pen.) | Stadium: New Cuthbury; Referee: Elliott Swallow |
Note: Match was originally going to be played on 22 November 2024 but was postponed due to a frozen pitch.

| 27 January 2025 | Brentford | 2–2 | Chelsea | Staines-upon-Thames |
| 13:00 | Lisbie 2', 81' | | Ampah 20'; Rak-Sakyi 90' | Stadium: Wheatsheaf Park; Referee: Stephen Parkinson |

| 31 January 2025 | Chelsea | 2–1 | Derby County | Kingston-upon-Thames |
| 13:00 | McNeilly 11'; Ampah 33' | Report | Osayande 64' | Stadium: Kingsmeadow; Attendance: 246; Referee: Jamie O'Connor |

=== Ranking of Group Runners-Up ===
| Team | Pld | W | D | L | GF | GA | GD | Pts |
|---|---|---|---|---|---|---|---|---|
| Sunderland | 6 | 3 | 1 | 2 | 15 | 7 | +8 | 10 |
| Brentford | 6 | 3 | 1 | 2 | 14 | 12 | +2 | 10 |
| Leicester City | 6 | 3 | 1 | 2 | 9 | 7 | +2 | 10 |
| Luton Town | 6 | 3 | 1 | 2 | 10 | 13 | −3 | 10 |
| Southampton | 6 | 2 | 3 | 1 | 12 | 10 | +2 | 9 |
| Ipswich Town | 6 | 2 | 3 | 1 | 11 | 9 | +2 | 9 |
| Blackburn Rovers | 6 | 2 | 3 | 1 | 10 | 9 | +1 | 9 |
| Stockport County | 6 | 3 | 0 | 3 | 15 | 15 | 0 | 9 |
| Bromley | 6 | 3 | 0 | 3 | 10 | 11 | −1 | 9 |

Updated to match(es) played on February 11, 2025. Source: Premier League

== Knockout stages ==
=== Round of 16 ===
| 28 February 2025 | Queens Park Rangers | 2–0 | Leicester City | Hayes |
| 13:00 | Murphy 45+5' (pen.); Sutton 69' | Report | | Stadium: SKyEx Community Stadium; Attendance: 100; Referee: Stephen Parkinson |

| 7 March 2025 | Chelsea | 2–1 | Ipswich Town | Kingston upon Thames |
| 13:00 | Mheuka 63' (pen.); Kavuma-McQueen 90' | Report | Oudnie-Morgan 39' | Stadium: Kingsmeadow; Attendance: 168; Referee: Isaac Searle |

| 7 March 2025 | Cardiff City | 1–1 (a.e.t.) (4–5 p) | West Bromwich Albion | Leckwith |
| 13:00 | Nyakuhwa 3' | Report | Kirton 90' | Stadium: Cardiff International Sports Stadium; Attendance: 150; Referee: Richie Watkins |
| | Penalties |
| | Šimić (penalty scored); Nyakuhwa (penalty scored); Jefferies (penalty scored); Conte (penalty scored); Twose (penalty missed) | | (penalty scored) Whitwell; (penalty scored) Williams; (penalty scored) Ranger; (penalty scored) Mohammed; (penalty scored) Onyemachi |

| 7 March 2025 | Nottingham Forest | 2–0 | Luton Town | Loughborough |
| 13:00 | McAdam 39'; Fletcher 52' | Report | | Stadium: Loughborough University Stadium; Attendance: 150; Referee: Aaron Bannister |

| 10 March 2025 | Burnley | 1–0 | Sunderland | Chorley |
| 14:00 | Tweedy 19' | Report | | Stadium: Victory Park; Attendance: 107; Referee: James Bancroft |

| 11 March 2025 | Charlton Athletic | 7–0 | Blackburn Rovers | Dartford |
| 14:00 | Dixon 10', 34', 65'; Bower 26'; Fullah 47'; Casey 60'; Toure 87' | Report | | Stadium: Princes Park; Attendance: 111; Referee: Jason Richardson |

| 12 March 2025 | Sheffield United | 1–4 | Southampton | York |
| 14:00 | Atherton 39' | Report | Dipepa 6', 44'; Robinson 75'; Akachukwu 79' | Stadium: LNER Community Stadium; Attendance: 106; Referee: Neil Hair |

| 13 March 2025 | Exeter City | 0–1 | Brentford | Exeter |
| 14:00 | | Report | Holland 63' | Stadium: St James Park; Attendance: 165; Referee: Kirsty Dowle |

=== Quarterfinals ===
| 28 March 2025 | Brentford | 1–0 | Nottingham Forest | Staines-upon-Thames |
| 14:00 | Morgan 39' | Report | | Stadium: Wheatsheaf Park; Attendance: 270; Referee: Abigail Byrne |

| 29 March 2025 | Southampton | 5–3 (a.e.t.) | Charlton Athletic | Marchwood |
| 9:00 | Payne 23'; Akachukwu 26'; Bragg 108'; Ehibhatiomhan 111'; Charles 120+1' | Report | Casey 41'; Mwamba 64'; Kedwell 103' | Stadium: Staplewood Training Ground; Attendance: 67; Referee: Ryan Atkin |

| 31 March 2025 | West Bromwich Albion | 2–3 | Queens Park Rangers | Solihull |
| 13:00 | Sule 10', 59' | Report | Dillon 53', 72'; Sutton 66' | Stadium: ARMCO Arena; Attendance: 105; Referee: Isaac Searle |

| 7 April 2025 | Burnley | 2–0 | Chelsea | Chorley |
| 13:00 | Vetro 24'; Tweedy 60' | Report | | Stadium: Victory Park; Attendance: 241; Referee: Declan Brown |

=== Semifinals ===
| 30 April 2025 | Queens Park Rangers | 2–0 | Burnley | Shepherd's Bush |
| 14:00 | Murphy 75' (pen.); Petrie 90+6' | Report | | Stadium: Loftus Road; Attendance: 751; Referee: Oliver Mackey |

| 1 May 2025 | Southampton | 0–2 | Brentford | Southampton |
| 14:00 | | Report | Morgan 2'; Avenall 55' | Stadium: St Mary's Stadium; Attendance: 300; Referee: Greg Rollason |

=== Final ===
15 May 2025
19:00 GMT

| Queens Park Rangers | 3–1 | Brentford |
|---|---|---|
| Morgan 9'; Murphy 39'; Wilkie 90+1' | Report | Arthur 14' |

Loftus Road, Shepherd's Bush
Attendance: 7,845
Referee: Richard Eley

Note: Flags indicate national team as defined under FIFA eligibility rules; some limited exceptions apply. Players may hold more than one non-FIFA nationality.

Queens Park Rangers
| No. | Pos. | Nation | Player |
|---|---|---|---|
| 1 | GK | ENG | Matteo Salamon |
| 2 | DF | ENG | Jaiden Putman |
| 3 | DF | ENG | Jack McDowell |
| 4 | DF | ENG | Alex Wilkie |
| 5 | DF | BRA | Esquerdinha (substituted off) 90+4' |
| 6 | MF | ENG | Kieran Morgan (substituted off) 90+4' |
| 7 | MF | WAL | Alfie Tuck (substituted off) 79' |
| 8 | MF | ENG | Harry Murphy |
| 9 | MF | AUS | Daniel Bennie (substituted off) 26' |
| 10 | MF | ENG | Emmerson Sutton |
| 11 | FW | IRL | Cian Dillon |
Substitutes:
| 13 | GK | ENG | Joel Halliday |
| 15 | DF | SCO | Noah McCann (substituted on) 90+4' |
| 16 | MF | ENG | Archie O'Brien (substituted on) 79' |
| 14 | MF | ENG | Kieran Petrie (substituted on) 26' |
| 12 | FW | ENG | Rohan Vaughan (substituted on) 90+4' |
Coach: (England) Paul Furlong

Brentford
| No. | Pos. | Nation | Player |
|---|---|---|---|
| 1 | GK | USA | Julian Eyestone |
| 2 | DF | ENG | Caelan Avenell (substituted off) 73' |
| 3 | MF | ENG | Max Dickov (substituted off) 87' |
| 4 | DF | NGA | Benjamin Fredrick |
| 5 | DF | ENG | Benjamin Arthur |
| 6 | DF | ENG | Josh Stephenson |
| 7 | MF | ENG | Tony Yogane |
| 8 | FW | ENG | Ethan Brierley |
| 9 | FW | WAL | Iwan Morgan |
| 10 | MF | ENG | Riley Owen |
| 11 | FW | ENG | Ashley Hay |
Substitutes:
| 12 | DF | ENG | Ollie Shield |
| 13 | GK | ENG | Reggie Rose |
| 14 | MF | ENG | Andre Grey |
| 15 | DF | ENG | Vonnté Williams (substituted on) 73' |
| 16 | DF | ENG | Chanse Headman (substituted on) 87' |
Coach: (Scotland) Neil MacFarlane
