= 2026–27 Charlton Athletic F.C. season =

English football club season

Charlton Athletic
2026–27 season
- Chairman: Gavin Carter
- Manager: Nathan Jones
- Stadium: The Valley
- Championship: 19th
- EFL Cup: Second round (vs. Tottenham Hotspur)
- Top goalscorer: League: Tyreece Campbell (4); All: Tyreece Campbell (5)
- Highest home attendance: 21,539 (vs. Derby County, 15 August 2026)
- Lowest home attendance: 14,885 (vs. Bolton Wanderers, 3 November 2026)
- Average home league attendance: 18,617
Home colours	Away colours	Third colours

The 2026–27 season is the 121st season in the existence of Charlton Athletic, having been founded in 1905, and their second season back in the Championship. The club are participating in the Championship, the FA Cup and the EFL Cup. The season covers the period from 1 July 2026 to 30 June 2027.

== Kit ==
The partnership with sportswear manufacturers Reebok as Charlton's kit suppliers continued into the season, with front of shirt sponsor being RSK Group.

== Squad statistics ==
As of 21 November 2026

No.	Pos	Nat	Player	Total		Championship		FA Cup		EFL Cup	
No.	Pos	Nat	Player	Apps	Goals	Apps	Goals	Apps	Goals	Apps	Goals
1	GK	(Belgium) BEL	Thomas Kaminski	0	0	0+0	0	0+0	0	0+0	0
2	DF	(England) ENG	Kayne Ramsay	5	1	4+1	1	0+0	0	0+0	0
3	DF	(Scotland) SCO	Josh Edwards	3	0	2+1	0	0+0	0	0+0	0
4	DF	(England) ENG	Reece Burke	0	0	0+0	0	0+0	0	0+0	0
5	DF	(England) ENG	Lloyd Jones	16	3	14+0	2	0+0	0	1+1	1
6	MF	(Republic of Ireland) IRL	Conor Coventry	16	0	14+1	0	0+0	0	1+0	0
7	FW	(Jamaica) JAM	Tyreece Campbell	17	5	15+1	4	0+0	0	1+0	1
8	MF	(England) ENG	Harvey Knibbs	8	0	2+5	0	0+0	0	1+0	0
9	FW	(England) ENG	Karlan Grant	16	2	13+2	2	0+0	0	1+0	0
10	MF	(Scotland) SCO	Greg Docherty	1	0	0+0	0	0+0	0	1+0	0
11	FW	(England) ENG	Miles Leaburn	16	0	11+3	0	0+0	0	0+2	0
12	DF	(France) FRA	Billy Koumetio	12	0	10+0	0	0+0	0	2+0	0
13	GK	(Nigeria) NGR	Arthur Okonkwo (on loan from Wrexham)	12	0	12+0	0	0+0	0	0+0	0
14	MF	(England) ENG	Sonny Carey	12	1	5+6	0	0+0	0	1+0	1
15	MF	(England) ENG	Nathaniel Chalobah	6	0	4+1	0	0+0	0	1+0	0
16	MF	(Kenya) KEN	Timothy Ouma (on loan from Slavia Prague)	4	0	1+2	0	0+0	0	1+0	0
17	DF	(Jamaica) JAM	Amari'i Bell	13	0	11+1	0	0+0	0	1+0	0
18	DF	(Slovakia) SVK	Ivan Mesík	14	1	6+6	1	0+0	0	1+1	0
19	FW	(Republic of Ireland) IRL	Millenic Alli	16	1	5+9	1	0+0	0	1+1	0
20	DF	(Republic of Ireland) IRL	Danny McNamara	16	0	12+2	0	0+0	0	1+1	0
21	GK	(Republic of Ireland) IRL	Tiernan Brooks	1	0	0+0	0	0+0	0	1+0	0
22	FW	(England) ENG	Tanto Olaofe	0	0	0+0	0	0+0	0	0+0	0
23	FW	(United States) USA	Charlie Kelman	10	1	5+5	1	0+0	0	0+0	0
24	FW	(England) ENG	Matt Godden	5	3	1+3	2	0+0	0	1+0	1
25	GK	(England) ENG	Will Mannion	5	0	4+0	0	0+0	0	1+0	0
26	MF	(England) ENG	Joe Rankin-Costello	12	0	5+6	0	0+0	0	0+1	0
27	MF	(England) ENG	Ibrahim Fullah	0	0	0+0	0	0+0	0	0+0	0
28	DF	(Kenya) KEN	Collins Sichenje	4	0	0+2	0	0+0	0	1+1	0
29	FW	(Sierra Leone) SLE	Daniel Kanu	0	0	0+0	0	0+0	0	0+0	0
30	MF	(Scotland) SCO	Rob Apter	2	0	0+1	0	0+0	0	1+0	0
31	DF	(Uganda) UGA	Nathan Asiimwe	2	0	0+1	0	0+0	0	1+0	0
32	MF	(England) ENG	Alan Mwamba	10	0	3+5	0	0+0	0	0+2	0
33	FW	(England) ENG	Micah Mbick	9	0	1+7	0	0+0	0	1+0	0
34	MF	(England) ENG	Oliver Skipp (on loan from Leicester City)	10	0	8+2	0	0+0	0	0+0	0
35	FW	(Spain) ESP	Junior Nkeng	0	0	0+0	0	0+0	0	0+0	0
36	DF	(England) ENG	Keenan Gough	0	0	0+0	0	0+0	0	0+0	0
38	DF	(Fiji) FIJ	Josh Laqeretabua	0	0	0+0	0	0+0	0	0+0	0
39	MF	(Finland) FIN	Otto Tiitinen (on loan from Ilves)	0	0	0+0	0	0+0	0	0+0	0
44	DF	(New Zealand) NZL	Tyler Bindon (on loan from Nottingham Forest)	8	0	8+0	0	0+0	0	0+0	0
53	FW	(England) ENG	Bradley Tagoe	0	0	0+0	0	0+0	0	0+0	0
62	FW	(England) ENG	Josh Hebert	0	0	0+0	0	0+0	0	0+0	0
—	DF	(England) ENG	Zach Mitchell	0	0	0+0	0	0+0	0	0+0	0
—	MF	(England) ENG	Kai Enslin	0	0	0+0	0	0+0	0	0+0	0
—	MF	(England) ENG	Henry Rylah	0	0	0+0	0	0+0	0	0+0	0
—	FW	(Morocco) MAR	Gassan Ahadme	0	0	0+0	0	0+0	0	0+0	0

=== Top scorers ===
As of 21 November 2026

Place	Position	Nation	Number	Name	Championship	FA Cup	EFL Cup	Total
1	FW	(England)	7	Tyreece Campbell	4	0	1	5
2	DF	(England)	5	Lloyd Jones	2	0	1	3
=	FW	(England)	24	Matt Godden	2	0	1	3
4	FW	(England)	9	Karlan Grant	2	0	0	2
5	DF	(England)	2	Kayne Ramsay	1	0	0	1
=	DF	(Slovakia)	18	Ivan Mesík	1	0	0	1
=	FW	(United States)	23	Charlie Kelman	1	0	0	1
=	FW	(Republic of Ireland)	19	Millenic Alli	1	0	0	1
=	MF	(England)	14	Sonny Carey	0	0	1	1
Totals					14	0	4	18

=== Disciplinary record ===
As of 21 November 2026

Number	Nation	Position	Name	Championship		FA Cup		EFL Cup		Total	
Number	Nation	Position	Name	Yellow card	Red card	Yellow card	Red card	Yellow card	Red card	Yellow card	Red card
20	(Republic of Ireland)	DF	Danny McNamara	5	1	0	0	0	0	5	1
6	(Republic of Ireland)	MF	Conor Coventry	4	0	0	0	0	0	4	0
44	(New Zealand)	DF	Tyler Bindon	3	0	0	0	0	0	3	0
32	(England)	MF	Alan Mwamba	3	0	0	0	0	0	3	0
34	(England)	MF	Oliver Skipp	3	0	0	0	0	0	3	0
11	(England)	FW	Miles Leaburn	2	0	0	0	0	0	2	0
18	(Slovakia)	DF	Ivan Mesík	2	0	0	0	0	0	2	0
9	(England)	FW	Karlan Grant	2	0	0	0	0	0	2	0
8	(England)	MF	Harvey Knibbs	2	0	0	0	0	0	2	0
26	(England)	MF	Joe Rankin-Costello	2	0	0	0	0	0	2	0
5	(England)	DF	Lloyd Jones	1	0	0	0	0	0	1	0
12	(France)	DF	Billy Koumetio	1	0	0	0	0	0	1	0
7	(Jamaica)	FW	Tyreece Campbell	1	0	0	0	0	0	1	0
3	(Scotland)	DF	Josh Edwards	1	0	0	0	0	0	1	0
30	(Scotland)	MF	Rob Apter	0	0	0	0	1	0	1	0
Totals				32	1	0	0	1	0	33	1

== Transfers ==
=== Transfers in ===
Date from	Position	Nationality	Name	From	Fee	Ref.
30 June 2026	CB	(Slovakia)	Ivan Mesík	(Netherlands) Heracles Almelo	Undisclosed	
1 July 2026	CB	(France)	Billy Koumetio	(Scotland) Dundee	Undisclosed	
19 July 2026	FW	(England)	Karlan Grant	(England) West Bromwich Albion	Free transfer	
23 July 2026	RB	(Republic of Ireland)	Danny McNamara	(England) Millwall	Free transfer	
26 July 2026	LW	(Republic of Ireland)	Millenic Alli	(England) Luton Town	Undisclosed	
7 August 2026	DM	(England)	Nathaniel Chalobah	(England) Sheffield Wednesday	Free transfer	
1 September 2026	FW	(Spain)	Junior Nkeng	(England) AFC Wimbledon	Undisclosed	
29 September 2026	GK	(Scotland)	Lyndon Tas	(Scotland) Heart of Midlothian	Free transfer	

=== Transfers out ===
Date from	Position	Nationality	Name	To	Fee	Ref.
1 July 2026	MF	(England)	Reuben Amissah	Free agent	Released	
1 July 2026	MF	(England)	Luke Berry	Free agent	Released	
1 July 2026	DF	(England)	Toby Bower	(England) Walton & Hersham	Released	
1 July 2026	FW	(Republic of Ireland)	Patrick Casey	Free agent	Released	
1 July 2026	FW	(Scotland)	Lyndon Dykes	(England) Millwall	Released	
1 July 2026	CB	(England)	Macaulay Gillesphey	(England) Bradford City	Undisclosed	
1 July 2026	DF	(England)	Oliver Hobden	(England) Chatham Town	Released	
1 July 2026	DF	(England)	Mason Hunter	(England) Havant & Waterlooville	Released	
1 July 2026	DF	(England)	Max Kuzcynski	Free agent	Released	
1 July 2026	FW	(England)	Paris Lock	(England) Folkestone Invicta	Released	
1 July 2026	GK	(England)	Lennon MacLorg	(England) Gillingham	Released	
1 July 2026	DF	(England)	Lanre Olatunji	Free agent	Released	
1 July 2026	GK	(England)	Tommy Reid	(England) Walton & Hersham	Released	
1 July 2026	MF	(Wales)	Terry Taylor	(England) Stevenage	Released	
21 July 2026	MF	(Jamaica)	Karoy Anderson	(England) Blackpool	Undisclosed	
23 July 2026	DF	(England)	Alex Mitchell	(England) Plymouth Argyle	Undisclosed	
24 July 2026	FW	(Jamaica)	Kaheim Dixon	(Serbia) Novi Pazar	Undisclosed	
2 September 2026	MF	(Scotland)	Greg Docherty	(England) Preston North End	Released	

=== Loans in ===
Date from	Position	Nationality	Name	From	Date until	Ref.
10 August 2026	DM	(Kenya)	Timothy Ouma	(Czech Republic) Slavia Prague	End of season (Note: Option to make Ouma's move permanent at conclusion of the loan.)	
20 August 2026	GK	(Nigeria)	Arthur Okonkwo	(Wales) Wrexham	End of season	
30 August 2026	CB	(New Zealand)	Tyler Bindon	(England) Nottingham Forest	End of season	
1 September 2026	DM	(England)	Oliver Skipp	(England) Leicester City	End of season	
4 September 2026	MF	(Finland)	Otto Tiitinen	(Finland) Ilves	End of season (Note: Option to make Tiitinen's move permanent at conclusion of the loan.)	

=== Loans out ===
Date from	Position	Nationality	Name	To	Date until	Ref.
1 July 2026	SS	(Morocco)	Gassan Ahadme	(England) Cambridge United	End of season	
6 July 2026	CB	(England)	Zach Mitchell	(Scotland) St Johnstone	30 September 2026	
9 July 2026	DF	(England)	Ty Ewens-Findlay	(England) Crawley Town	End of season	
7 August 2026	DF	(England)	Keenan Gough	(England) Bristol Rovers	End of season	
7 August 2026	FW	(England)	Tanto Olaofe	(England) Lincoln City	End of season	
8 August 2026	DF	(Fiji)	Josh Laqeretabua	(England) Dorking Wanderers	1 September 2026	
8 August 2026	MF	(England)	Henry Rylah	(England) Solihull Moors	31 December 2026	
28 August 2026	GK	(Belgium)	Thomas Kaminski	(Cyprus) Omonia	End of season	
31 August 2026	FW	(Sierra Leone)	Daniel Kanu	(England) Notts County	End of season	
1 September 2026	MF	(England)	Ibrahim Fullah	(England) Milton Keynes Dons	End of season	
1 September 2026	DF	(Uganda)	Nathan Asiimwe	(England) Salford City	End of season	
18 September 2026	GK	(England)	George Hardy	(England) Chatham Town	25 September 2026	
23 September 2026	GK	(England)	Finley Woodham	(England) Southend United	7 October 2026	
17 October 2026	MF	(England)	Jacob Safa	(England) Carshalton Athletic	3 January 2027	
23 October 2026	GK	(England)	Finley Woodham	(England) Billericay Town	22 November 2026	
5 November 2026	DF	(Fiji)	Josh Laqeretabua	(England) Eastleigh	4 December 2026	
12 November 2026	MF	(England)	Kai Enslin	(England) Dorking Wanderers	3 January 2027	

== Friendlies ==
On Monday 18 May 2026, Charlton announced their first pre-season friendly against Dartford. On Friday 29 May 2026, Charlton announced their second pre-season friendly against Gillingham. On Wednesday 3 June 2026, Charlton announced their third pre-season friendly against AFC Wimbledon. On Wednesday 10 June 2026, Charlton announced their fourth pre-season friendly against Reading. On Wednesday 17 June 2026, Charlton announced their fifth pre-season friendly against NK Maribor taking place on the club's Slovenian training camp. On Friday 19 June 2026, Charlton announced their sixth pre-season friendly against Colchester United. On Thursday 30 July 2026, Charlton announced their pre-season friendly against Reading would now be played behind closed doors at The Valley following concerns regarding the playing surface at the Royals' stadium.

3 July 2026 Friendly	Dartford	0–1	Charlton Athletic	Dartford
19:45 BST		Report	Apter 31'	Stadium: Princes Park; Attendance: 3,058; Referee: Nick Dunn

10 July 2026 Friendly	NK Maribor	1–1	Charlton Athletic	Maribor, Slovenia
17:00 BST	Tshipamba 80'	Report	Leaburn 50'	Stadium: Ljudski Vrt Stadium; Attendance: 4,000; Referee: Alen Borosak

18 July 2026 Friendly	Gillingham	0–1	Charlton Athletic	Gillingham
15:00 BST		Report	Burke 65'	Stadium: MEMS Priestfield Stadium; Attendance: 2,747 (935 away); Referee: Harry Wager

25 July 2026 Friendly	AFC Wimbledon	2–0	Charlton Athletic	Wimbledon
15:00 BST	Jennings 13'; Trialist B 49'	Report		Stadium: Cherry Red Records Stadium; Attendance: 2,528 (862 away)

28 July 2026 Friendly	Colchester United	0–2	Charlton Athletic	Colchester
19:45 BST		Report	Godden 22'; Grant 23'	Stadium: JobServe Community Stadium; Attendance: 1,281 (305 away); Referee: Carl Brook

1 August 2026 Friendly	Charlton Athletic	0–3	Reading	Charlton
14:15 BST		Report	Wing 45', 83'; Evans 67'	Stadium: The Valley; Attendance: 0 Referee: Sunny Gill

== Competitions ==
=== Overall record ===
Competition	First match	Last match	Starting round	Final position	Record							
Competition	First match	Last match	Starting round	Final position	Pld	W	D	L	GF	GA	GD	Win %
Championship	15 August 2026	1 May 2027	Matchday 1		16	4	5	7	14	25	−11	25.00
FA Cup	9 January 2027		Third round		0	0	0	0	0	0	+0	—
EFL Cup	8 August 2026	26 August 2026	First round	Second round	2	1	0	1	4	6	−2	50.00
Total					18	5	5	8	18	31	−13	27.78

Last updated: 21 November 2026
Source: Soccerway

=== Championship ===
==== League table ====
Pos	Team	Pld	W	D	L	GF	GA	GD	Pts
17	Bolton Wanderers	16	5	3	8	21	30	−9	18
18	Bristol City	16	5	3	8	16	26	−10	18
19	Charlton Athletic	16	4	5	7	14	25	−11	17
20	Lincoln City	16	4	3	9	15	27	−12	15
21	Watford	16	4	3	9	13	27	−14	15

Updated to match(es) played on 21 November 2026. Source: EFL Official Website
Rules for classification: 1) Points; 2) Goal difference; 3) Number of goals scored; 4) Head-to-head results; 5) Wins; 6) Away goals; 7) Penalty points (sec 9.5); 8) Number of 12-point sending off offences; 9) Play-off (only if needed to determine promotion/relegation)

==== Result summary ====
Overall								Home						Away					
Pld	W	D	L	GF	GA	GD	Pts	W	D	L	GF	GA	GD	W	D	L	GF	GA	GD
16	4	5	7	14	25	−11	17	3	3	2	7	7	0	1	2	5	7	18	−11

Last updated: 21 November 2026.

==== Results by round ====
Round	1	2	3	4	5	6	7	8	9	10	11	12	13	14	15	16	17	18	19	20	21	22	23	24	25	26	27	28	29	30	31	32	33	34	35	36	37	38	39	40	41	42	43	44	45	46
Ground	H	A	H	A	A	H	H	A	H	A	A	H	A	H	H	A	H	A	H	A	H	A	H	A	A	H	H	A	A	H	A	H	H	A	H	A	H	A	A	H	A	H	A	H	H	A
Result	W	W	W	D	L	D	D	L	D	D	L	L	L	L	W	L																														
Position	6	3	1	3	6	5	6	9	12	13	17	19	20	21	19	19																														
Points	3	6	9	10	10	11	12	12	13	14	14	14	14	14	17	17																														

Updated to match(es) played on 21 November 2026. Source: Charlton Athletic Official Site
A = Away; H = Home; W = Win; D = Draw; L = Loss; P = postponed

==== Matches ====
The 2026–27 season fixtures were released on Thursday 25 June 2026.

15 August 2026 1	Charlton Athletic	2–1	Derby County	Charlton
15:00 BST	Jones 61'; Campbell 80'	Report	Szmodics 23'	Stadium: The Valley; Attendance: 21,539 (3,057 away); Referee: Benjamin Speedie

22 August 2026 2	West Ham United	1–2	Charlton Athletic	Stratford
15:00 BST	Piroe 74'	Report	Jones 7'; Campbell 56'	Stadium: London Stadium; Attendance: 62,264 (3,001 away); Referee: Andrew Kitchen

29 August 2026 3	Charlton Athletic	1–0	Preston North End	Charlton
15:00 BST	Grant 56'	Report		Stadium: The Valley; Attendance: 17,256 (962 away); Referee: Tom Reeves

2 September 2026 4	West Bromwich Albion	1–1	Charlton Athletic	West Bromwich
19:45 BST	Styles 59'	Report	Campbell 69'	Stadium: The Hawthorns; Attendance: 22,578 (923 away); Referee: Farai Hallam

5 September 2026 5	Stoke City	4–0	Charlton Athletic	Stoke-on-Trent
12:30 BST	Devenny 15' (pen.), 40'; Galbraith 22'; Hirst 25'	Report		Stadium: Bet365 Stadium; Attendance: 21,071 (1,322 away); Referee: Robert Madley
Note: Live on Sky Sports+

9 September 2026 6	Charlton Athletic	0–0	Queens Park Rangers	Charlton
20:00 BST		Report		Stadium: The Valley; Attendance: 17,876 (3,049 away); Referee: Tom Nield
Note: Live on Sky Sports Football

12 September 2026 7	Charlton Athletic	0–0	Portsmouth	Charlton
15:00 BST		Report		Stadium: The Valley; Attendance: 18,836 (3,052 away); Referee: Andrew Kitchen

19 September 2026 8	Cardiff City	3–1	Charlton Athletic	Cardiff
12:30 BST	Moylan 8', 61'; Salech 24'	Report	Campbell 29'	Stadium: Cardiff City Stadium; Attendance: 21,108 (1,841 away); Referee: Elliot Bell
Note: Live on Sky Sports+

10 October 2026 9	Charlton Athletic	1–1	Bristol City	Charlton
12:30 BST	Grant 8'	Report	Twine 27' (pen.)	Stadium: The Valley; Attendance: 20,481 (2,855 away); Referee: Tom Reeves
Note: Live on Sky Sports+

13 October 2026 10	Burnley	2–2	Charlton Athletic	Burnley
19:45 BST	Larsen 36'; Ramazani 57'	Report	Ramsay 50'; Mesík 90+6'	Stadium: Turf Moor; Attendance: 19,408 (1,100 away); Referee: Anthony Backhouse

17 October 2026 11	Watford	2–0	Charlton Athletic	Watford
12:30 BST	Kjerrumgaard 58'; Zemura 90+4'	Report		Stadium: Vicarage Road; Attendance: 18,031 (2,284 away); Referee: Thomas Bramall
Note: Live on Sky Sports Football

24 October 2026 12	Charlton Athletic	1–3	Norwich City	Charlton
12:30 BST	Kelman 10'	Report	Maghoma 35'; Kvistgaarden 50'; Mesík 76' (o.g.)	Stadium: The Valley; Attendance: 19,588 (3,055 away); Referee: John Busby
Note: Live on Sky Sports Football

31 October 2026 13	Middlesbrough	3–0	Charlton Athletic	Middlesbrough
15:00 GMT	Berhalter 12'; Lankshear 44', 82'	Report		Stadium: Riverside Stadium; Attendance: 29,831 (500 away); Referee: Will Finnie

3 November 2026 14	Charlton Athletic	0–1	Bolton Wanderers	Charlton
19:45 GMT		Report	Dalby 18'	Stadium: The Valley; Attendance: 14,885 (1,106 away); Referee: Stephen Martin

7 November 2026 15	Charlton Athletic	2–1	Sheffield United	Charlton
15:00 GMT	Alli 12'; Godden 79'	Report	Ayew 25'	Stadium: The Valley; Attendance: 18,474 (2,705 away); Referee: Matthew Corlett

21 November 2026 16	Wolverhampton Wanderers	2–1	Charlton Athletic	Wolverhampton
15:00 GMT	Armstrong 51'; Saïd 54'	Report	Godden 82'	Stadium: Molineux Stadium; Attendance: 29,523 (2,006 away); Referee: Simon Hooper

24 November 2026 17	Charlton Athletic	–	Lincoln City	Charlton
19:45 GMT				Stadium: The Valley; Referee: Oliver Langford

28 November 2026 18	Blackburn Rovers	–	Charlton Athletic	Blackburn
12:30 GMT				Stadium: Ewood Park
Note: Live on Sky Sports+

5 December 2026 19	Charlton Athletic	–	Birmingham City	Charlton
15:00 GMT				Stadium: The Valley

8 December 2026 20	Wrexham	–	Charlton Athletic	Wrexham
19:45 GMT				Stadium: Racecourse Ground

12 December 2026 21	Charlton Athletic	–	Swansea City	Charlton
15:00 GMT				Stadium: The Valley

19 December 2026 22	Millwall	–	Charlton Athletic	Bermondsey
12:30 GMT				Stadium: The Den

26 December 2026 23	Charlton Athletic	–	Southampton	Charlton
15:00 GMT				Stadium: The Valley

29 December 2026 24	Norwich City	–	Charlton Athletic	Norwich
19:45 GMT				Stadium: Carrow Road

1 January 2027 25	Swansea City	–	Charlton Athletic	Swansea
15:00 GMT				Stadium: Swansea.com Stadium

17 January 2027 26	Charlton Athletic	–	Watford	Charlton
12:00 GMT				Stadium: The Valley
Note: Live on Sky Sports Football

23 January 2027 27	Charlton Athletic	–	Middlesbrough	Charlton
15:00 GMT				Stadium: The Valley

26 January 2027 28	Bolton Wanderers	–	Charlton Athletic	Horwich
19:45 GMT				Stadium: Toughsheet Community Stadium

30 January 2027 29	Sheffield United	–	Charlton Athletic	Sheffield
15:00 GMT				Stadium: Bramall Lane

6 February 2027 30	Charlton Athletic	–	Wolverhampton Wanderers	Charlton
12:30 GMT				Stadium: The Valley
Note: Live on Sky Sports Football

13 February 2027 31	Portsmouth	–	Charlton Athletic	Portsmouth
12:30 GMT				Stadium: Fratton Park
Note: Live on Sky Sports Football

16 February 2027 32	Charlton Athletic	–	Burnley	Charlton
19:45 GMT				Stadium: The Valley

20 February 2027 33	Charlton Athletic	–	Cardiff City	Charlton
15:00 GMT				Stadium: The Valley

27 February 2027 34	Bristol City	–	Charlton Athletic	Bristol
12:30 GMT				Stadium: Ashton Gate
Note: Live on Sky Sports+

2 March 2027 35	Charlton Athletic	–	West Ham United	Charlton
19:45 GMT				Stadium: The Valley

6 March 2027 36	Derby County	–	Charlton Athletic	Derby
15:00 GMT				Stadium: Pride Park Stadium

13 March 2027 37	Charlton Athletic	–	Blackburn Rovers	Charlton
15:00 GMT				Stadium: The Valley

17 March 2027 38	Birmingham City	–	Charlton Athletic	Birmingham
19:45 GMT				Stadium: St. Andrew's @ Knighthead Park

20 March 2027 39	Southampton	–	Charlton Athletic	Southampton
15:00 GMT				Stadium: St Mary's Stadium

3 April 2027 40	Charlton Athletic	–	Millwall	Charlton
12:30 BST				Stadium: The Valley

6 April 2027 41	Queens Park Rangers	–	Charlton Athletic	Shepherd's Bush
19:45 BST				Stadium: MATRADE Loftus Road Stadium

10 April 2027 42	Charlton Athletic	–	Stoke City	Charlton
15:00 BST				Stadium: The Valley

17 April 2027 43	Preston North End	–	Charlton Athletic	Preston
15:00 BST				Stadium: Deepdale

20 April 2027 44	Charlton Athletic	–	West Bromwich Albion	Charlton
19:45 BST				Stadium: The Valley

24 April 2027 45	Charlton Athletic	–	Wrexham	Charlton
15:00 BST				Stadium: The Valley

1 May 2027 46	Lincoln City	–	Charlton Athletic	Lincoln
12:30 BST				Stadium: ProAmpac Stadium

=== FA Cup ===
9 January 2027 Third round	–
TBC GMT

=== EFL Cup ===
The first round draw was made on Thursday 25 June 2026. The second round draw was made on Monday 10 August 2026. On Wednesday 12 August 2026, the date of the second round was announced.

8 August 2026 First round	Cheltenham Town	1–3	Charlton Athletic	Cheltenham
17:30 BST	Miller 55'	Report	Godden 22'; Carey 24'; Campbell 37'	Stadium: EV Charger Points Stadium; Attendance: 3,119 (816 away); Referee: Alan Dale
Note: Live on Sky Sports+

26 August 2026 Second round	Tottenham Hotspur	5–1	Charlton Athletic	Tottenham
19:45 BST	Moore 41'; Solanke 45'; Danso 67'; Sávio 82'; Davies 85'	Report	Jones 87'	Stadium: Tottenham Hotspur Stadium; Attendance: 49,008 (5,744 away); Referee: Adam Herczeg
Note: Live on Sky Sports+

=== Kent Senior Cup ===
20 October 2026 Second round	Tonbridge Angels	2–1	Charlton Athletic	Tonbridge
19:45 BST	Tanga 44'; McDonald 90'	Report	Rayment-Dawkins 82'	Stadium: Longmead Stadium; Attendance: 390; Referee: Byron Beard

=== London Senior Cup ===
13 October 2026 Second round	AFC Croydon Athletic	1–2	Charlton Athletic	Thornton Heath
19:45 BST	Bremang 75'	Report	Mylona 11'; Hebert 66'	Stadium: Mayfield Stadium; Attendance: 150; Referee: Jerahl Hall

2027 Third round	–	Charlton Athletic
19:45 GMT

== Awards ==
=== EFL awards ===
==== EFL Championship Manager of the Month ====
Month	Manager	Result	Ref.
August	(Wales) Nathan Jones	Nominated	

==== EFL Championship Player of the Month ====
Month	Player	Result	Ref.
August	(England) Lloyd Jones	Nominated	
