= Otto Tiitinen =

Finnish footballer (born 2008)

Personal information
- Full name: Otto Henrik Arthur Tiitinen
- Date of birth: 25 April 2008 (age 18)
- Place of birth: Karkku, Finland
- Height: 1.84 m (6 ft 0 in)
- Position: Central midfielder

Team information
- Current team: Charlton Athletic (on loan from Ilves)
- Number: 39

Youth career
- –2024: Ilves

Senior career*
Years	Team	Apps	(Gls)
2024–	Ilves II	18	(2)
2025–	Ilves	27	(2)
2026–	→ Charlton Athletic (loan)	0	(0)

International career^{‡}
2023	Finland U15	7	(1)
2023–2024	Finland U16	8	(1)
2024–2025	Finland U17	18	(3)
2026	Finland U18	1	(0)
2025–	Finland U19	8	(0)
- * Club domestic league appearances and goals as of 17:10, 4 September 2026 (UTC) ‡ National team caps and goals as of 17:10, 12 November 2026 (UTC)

Otto Henrik Arthur Tiitinen (born 25 April 2008) is a Finnish professional football player who plays as a central midfielder for EFL Championship club Charlton Athletic on loan from Veikkausliiga side Ilves.

== Club career ==
=== Ilves ===
Tiitinen is a product of Ilves youth sector and the club's academy. He made his senior debut with the reserve team in Kakkonen in 2024. On 15 January 2025, Tiitinen signed a three-year professional contract with Ilves. On 5 April, Tiitinen made his Veikkausliiga debut for Ilves aged 16, and scored the winning goal in a 3–2 home win over HJK Helsinki.

In October 2025, Tiitinen was named in the list of Next Generation 2025: 60 of the best young talents in world football by The Guardian, as the fourth Finnish player ever.

==== Charlton Athletic (loan) ====
On 4 September 2026, Tiitinen joined Championship side Charlton Athletic on a season-long loan, with the option of making the move permanent.

== International career ==
Tiitinen has represented Finland at under-15 and under-16 youth international levels and captained the Finland U17 national team.

== Career statistics ==
As of 22 August 2026

Appearances and goals by club, season and competition
Club	Season	Division	League		National cup (Note: Includes Suomen Cup, FA Cup)		League cup (Note: Includes Liiga Cup, EFL Cup)		Other		Total	
Club	Season	Division	Apps	Goals	Apps	Goals	Apps	Goals	Apps	Goals	Apps	Goals
Ilves II	2024	Kakkonen	13	1	2	0	–		–		15	1
Ilves II	2025	Kakkonen	3	0	–		–		–		3	0
Ilves II	2026	Kakkonen	2	1	–		–		–		2	1
Ilves II	Total		18	2	2	0	0	0	0	0	20	2
Ilves	2025	Veikkausliiga	13	1	0	0	5	0	3 (Note: Appearances in UEFA Europa League and UEFA Conference League)	0	21	1
Ilves	2026	Veikkausliiga	14	1	1	0	4	0	1 (Note: Appearances in UEFA Conference League)	0	20	1
Ilves	Total		27	2	1	0	9	0	4	0	41	2
Charlton Athletic (loan)	2026–27	Championship	0	0	0	0	—		—		0	0
Career total			45	4	3	0	9	0	3	0	60	4
