= 2025–26 Charlton Athletic F.C. season =

English football club season

Charlton Athletic
2025–26 season
- Chairman: Gavin Carter
- Manager: Nathan Jones
- Stadium: The Valley
- Championship: 19th
- FA Cup: Third round (vs. Chelsea)
- EFL Cup: Second round (vs. Cambridge United)
- Top goalscorer: League: Sonny Carey (8); All: Sonny Carey (8)
- Highest home attendance: 26,475 (vs. Chelsea, 10 January 2026)
- Lowest home attendance: 4,092 (vs. Stevenage, 12 August 2025)
- Average home league attendance: 20,066
Home colours	Away colours	Third colours

The 2025–26 season is the 120th season in the existence of Charlton Athletic, having been founded in 1905, and their first season back in the Championship. The club are participating in the Championship, the FA Cup and the EFL Cup. The season covers the period from 1 July 2025 to 30 June 2026.

== Kit ==
After a 13 year absence, sportswear manufacturers Reebok returned to English football and became Charlton's kit suppliers, with front of shirt sponsor being RSK Group.

== Squad statistics ==
As of 2 May 2026

No.	Pos	Nat	Player	Total		Championship		FA Cup		EFL Cup	
No.	Pos	Nat	Player	Apps	Goals	Apps	Goals	Apps	Goals	Apps	Goals
1	GK	(Belgium) BEL	Thomas Kaminski	37	0	37+0	0	0+0	0	0+0	0
2	DF	(England) ENG	Kayne Ramsay	37	0	33+4	0	0+0	0	0+0	0
3	DF	(England) ENG	Macaulay Gillesphey	38	2	22+13	2	0+1	0	2+0	0
4	DF	(England) ENG	Alex Mitchell	1	0	0+0	0	0+0	0	1+0	0
5	DF	(England) ENG	Lloyd Jones	47	1	45+1	1	1+0	0	0+0	0
6	MF	(Republic of Ireland) IRL	Conor Coventry	41	0	33+7	0	1+0	0	0+0	0
7	FW	(Jamaica) JAM	Tyreece Campbell	46	3	31+14	3	1+0	0	0+0	0
8	MF	(England) ENG	Luke Berry	17	2	6+10	1	0+0	0	0+1	1
9	FW	(Morocco) MAR	Gassan Ahadme	0	0	0+0	0	0+0	0	0+0	0
10	MF	(Scotland) SCO	Greg Docherty	40	1	32+7	1	1+0	0	0+0	0
11	FW	(England) ENG	Miles Leaburn	40	4	20+18	2	1+0	1	1+0	1
12	MF	(Wales) WAL	Terry Taylor	0	0	0+0	0	0+0	0	0+0	0
13	FW	(Jamaica) JAM	Kaheim Dixon	0	0	0+0	0	0+0	0	0+0	0
14	MF	(England) ENG	Sonny Carey	47	8	40+6	8	1+0	0	0+0	0
15	DF	(Guadeloupe) GLP	Jérôme Roussillon	0	0	0+0	0	0+0	0	0+0	0
15	DF	(England) ENG	Conor Coady (on loan from Wrexham)	12	1	11+1	1	0+0	0	0+0	0
16	DF	(Scotland) SCO	Josh Edwards	7	0	7+0	0	0+0	0	0+0	0
17	DF	(Jamaica) JAM	Amari'i Bell	35	0	32+2	0	1+0	0	0+0	0
18	MF	(Jamaica) JAM	Karoy Anderson	13	0	6+4	0	0+1	0	2+0	0
19	DF	(Uganda) UGA	Nathan Asiimwe	0	0	0+0	0	0+0	0	0+0	0
19	DF	(England) ENG	Luke Chambers (on loan from Liverpool)	18	0	16+2	0	0+0	0	0+0	0
20	DF	(England) ENG	Zach Mitchell	2	0	0+0	0	0+0	0	2+0	0
21	GK	(Australia) AUS	Ashley Maynard-Brewer	1	0	0+0	0	0+0	0	1+0	0
21	GK	(Republic of Ireland) IRL	Tiernan Brooks	0	0	0+0	0	0+0	0	0+0	0
22	FW	(England) ENG	Tanto Olaofe	25	1	6+16	1	0+1	0	2+0	0
23	FW	(United States) USA	Charlie Kelman	36	7	19+14	7	1+0	0	1+1	0
24	FW	(England) ENG	Matt Godden	11	2	2+9	2	0+0	0	0+0	0
25	GK	(England) ENG	Will Mannion	11	0	9+0	0	1+0	0	1+0	0
26	MF	(England) ENG	Joe Rankin-Costello	26	2	7+16	2	0+1	0	2+0	0
27	MF	(Cuba) CUB	Onel Hernández	6	0	2+4	0	0+0	0	0+0	0
28	DF	(England) ENG	James Bree (on loan from Southampton)	22	2	19+2	2	1+0	0	0+0	0
28	DF	(Kenya) KEN	Collins Sichenje	6	0	3+3	0	0+0	0	0+0	0
29	FW	(Sierra Leone) SLE	Daniel Kanu	1	0	0+0	0	0+0	0	0+1	0
30	MF	(Scotland) SCO	Rob Apter	13	1	8+5	1	0+0	0	0+0	0
31	GK	(England) ENG	Tommy Reid	0	0	0+0	0	0+0	0	0+0	0
32	DF	(England) ENG	Reece Burke	17	1	12+5	1	0+0	0	0+0	0
33	FW	(England) ENG	Micah Mbick	1	0	0+0	0	0+0	0	0+1	0
34	MF	(England) ENG	Kai Enslin	2	0	0+0	0	0+0	0	0+2	0
35	MF	(England) ENG	Alan Mwamba	2	0	0+0	0	0+0	0	0+2	0
36	DF	(England) ENG	Keenan Gough	5	0	2+1	0	1+0	0	0+1	0
37	MF	(England) ENG	Ibrahim Fullah	13	2	2+9	0	0+0	0	2+0	2
38	DF	(Fiji) FIJ	Josh Laqeretabua	2	0	0+1	0	0+0	0	1+0	0
39	MF	(England) ENG	Henry Rylah	2	0	0+0	0	0+0	0	1+1	0
40	GK	(England) ENG	Lennon MacLorg	0	0	0+0	0	0+0	0	0+0	0
41	MF	(England) ENG	Harvey Knibbs	29	3	7+19	3	0+1	0	2+0	0
42	DF	(England) ENG	Oliver Hobden	1	0	0+0	0	0+0	0	1+0	0
43	FW	(England) ENG	Paris Lock	0	0	0+0	0	0+0	0	0+0	0
44	DF	(England) ENG	Harry Clarke (on loan from Ipswich Town)	19	0	17+2	0	0+0	0	0+0	0
45	DF	(England) ENG	Ty Ewens-Findlay	0	0	0+0	0	0+0	0	0+0	0
46	FW	(England) ENG	Reuben Reid	0	0	0+0	0	0+0	0	0+0	0
47	FW	(England) ENG	Emmanuel Sol-Loza	0	0	0+0	0	0+0	0	0+0	0
48	MF	(England) ENG	Jacob Safa	0	0	0+0	0	0+0	0	0+0	0
49	DF	(England) ENG	Ethan Brown	0	0	0+0	0	0+0	0	0+0	0
50	DF	(England) ENG	Mason Hunter	0	0	0+0	0	0+0	0	0+0	0
77	MF	(England) ENG	Jayden Fevrier (on loan from Stockport County)	11	2	4+7	2	0+0	0	0+0	0
99	FW	(Scotland) SCO	Lyndon Dykes	20	3	16+4	3	0+0	0	0+0	0
—	FW	(Republic of Ireland) IRL	Patrick Casey	0	0	0+0	0	0+0	0	0+0	0

=== Top scorers ===
As of 2 May 2026

Place	Position	Nation	Number	Name	Championship	FA Cup	EFL Cup	Total
1	MF	(England)	14	Sonny Carey	8	0	0	8
2	FW	(United States)	23	Charlie Kelman	7	0	0	7
3	FW	(England)	11	Miles Leaburn	2	1	1	4
4	MF	(England)	41	Harvey Knibbs	3	0	0	3
=	FW	(Jamaica)	7	Tyreece Campbell	3	0	0	3
=	FW	(Scotland)	99	Lyndon Dykes	3	0	0	3
7	DF	(England)	28	James Bree	2	0	0	2
=	DF	(England)	3	Macaulay Gillesphey	2	0	0	2
=	MF	(England)	26	Joe Rankin-Costello	2	0	0	2
=	FW	(England)	24	Matt Godden	2	0	0	2
=	MF	(England)	77	Jayden Fevrier	2	0	0	2
=	MF	(England)	8	Luke Berry	1	0	1	2
=	MF	(England)	37	Ibrahim Fullah	0	0	2	2
14	MF	(Scotland)	30	Rob Apter	1	0	0	1
=	FW	(England)	22	Tanto Olaofe	1	0	0	1
=	DF	(England)	32	Reece Burke	1	0	0	1
=	DF	(England)	5	Lloyd Jones	1	0	0	1
=	DF	(England)	15	Conor Coady	1	0	0	1
=	MF	(Scotland)	10	Greg Docherty	1	0	0	1
Own goals					1	0	0	1
Totals					44	1	4	49

=== Disciplinary record ===
As of 2 May 2026

Number	Nation	Position	Name	Championship		FA Cup		EFL Cup		Total	
Number	Nation	Position	Name	Yellow card	Red card	Yellow card	Red card	Yellow card	Red card	Yellow card	Red card
5	(England)	DF	Lloyd Jones	10	0	0	0	0	0	10	0
44	(England)	DF	Harry Clarke	8	0	0	0	0	0	8	0
10	(Scotland)	MF	Greg Docherty	7	0	1	0	0	0	8	0
2	(England)	DF	Kayne Ramsay	7	1	0	0	0	0	7	1
28	(England)	DF	James Bree	7	0	0	0	0	0	7	0
6	(Republic of Ireland)	MF	Conor Coventry	7	0	0	0	0	0	7	0
26	(England)	MF	Joe Rankin-Costello	5	0	0	0	0	0	5	0
3	(England)	DF	Macaulay Gillesphey	4	0	0	0	1	0	5	0
41	(England)	MF	Harvey Knibbs	4	0	0	0	0	0	4	0
19	(England)	DF	Luke Chambers	4	0	0	0	0	0	4	0
17	(Jamaica)	DF	Amari'i Bell	4	0	0	0	0	0	4	0
18	(Jamaica)	MF	Karoy Anderson	2	0	0	0	1	1	3	1
14	(England)	MF	Sonny Carey	3	0	0	0	0	0	3	0
7	(Jamaica)	FW	Tyreece Campbell	3	0	0	0	0	0	3	0
11	(England)	FW	Miles Leaburn	3	0	0	0	0	0	3	0
99	(Scotland)	FW	Lyndon Dykes	3	0	0	0	0	0	3	0
1	(Belgium)	GK	Thomas Kaminski	3	0	0	0	0	0	3	0
22	(England)	FW	Tanto Olaofe	2	0	0	0	1	0	3	0
15	(England)	DF	Conor Coady	2	0	0	0	0	0	2	0
28	(Kenya)	DF	Collins Sichenje	2	0	0	0	0	0	2	0
30	(Scotland)	MF	Rob Apter	1	0	0	0	0	0	1	0
16	(Scotland)	DF	Josh Edwards	1	0	0	0	0	0	1	0
8	(England)	MF	Luke Berry	1	0	0	0	0	0	1	0
23	(United States)	FW	Charlie Kelman	1	0	0	0	0	0	1	0
37	(England)	MF	Ibrahim Fullah	1	0	0	0	0	0	1	0
27	(Cuba)	MF	Onel Hernández	1	0	0	0	0	0	1	0
32	(England)	DF	Reece Burke	1	0	0	0	0	0	1	0
24	(England)	FW	Matt Godden	1	0	0	0	0	0	1	0
42	(England)	DF	Oliver Hobden	0	0	0	0	1	0	1	0
Totals				98	1	1	0	4	1	103	2

== Transfers ==
=== Transfers in ===
Date from	Position	Nationality	Name	From	Fee	Ref.
1 July 2025 (Note: The transfer of Sonny Carey was announced on 6 June 2025 and would become official on 1 July 2025 once his Blackpool contract expired.)	MF	(England)	Sonny Carey	(England) Blackpool	Free transfer	
1 July 2025	GK	(Belgium)	Thomas Kaminski	(England) Luton Town	Undisclosed	
2 July 2025	FW	(England)	Tanto Olaofe	(England) Stockport County	Undisclosed	
4 July 2025	LB	(Jamaica)	Amari'i Bell	(England) Luton Town	Free transfer	
9 July 2025	DF	(England)	Reece Burke	(England) Luton Town	Undisclosed	
11 July 2025	MF	(England)	Joe Rankin-Costello	(England) Blackburn Rovers	Undisclosed	
17 July 2025	RW	(Scotland)	Rob Apter	(England) Blackpool	Undisclosed	
27 July 2025	FW	(United States)	Charlie Kelman	(England) Queens Park Rangers	Undisclosed	
1 August 2025	AM	(England)	Harvey Knibbs	(England) Reading	Undisclosed	
19 September 2025	GK	(England)	George Hardy	(England) Wolverhampton Wanderers	Free transfer	
29 September 2025	LW	(Cuba)	Onel Hernández	(England) Norwich City	Free transfer	
1 October 2025	MF	(England)	Reuben Amissah	(England) AFC Wimbledon	Free transfer	
18 November 2025	LB	(Guadeloupe)	Jérôme Roussillon	(Germany) Union Berlin	Free transfer	
15 January 2026	FW	(Scotland)	Lyndon Dykes	(England) Birmingham City	Undisclosed	
28 January 2026	GK	(Republic of Ireland)	Tiernan Brooks	(England) Gateshead	Undisclosed	
2 February 2026	CB	(Kenya)	Collins Sichenje	(Serbia) Vojvodina	Undisclosed	
9 April 2026	FW	(England)	Josh Hebert	(England) Dorking Wanderers	Free transfer	

=== Transfers out ===
Date from	Position	Nationality	Name	To	Fee	Ref.
1 July 2025	FW	(England)	Chuks Aneke	(England) Shrewsbury Town	Released	
1 July 2025	GK	(Australia)	Dean Bouzanis	(Australia) Brisbane Roar	Released	
1 July 2025	MF	(England)	Aaron Henry	(England) Boreham Wood	Released	
1 July 2025	FW	(England)	Danny Hylton	Retired	—N/a	
1 July 2025	MF	(England)	Harvey Kedwell	(England) AFC Croydon Athletic	Released	
1 July 2025	LB	(England)	Thierry Small	(England) Preston North End	Free transfer	
1 July 2025	RB	(England)	Tennai Watson	(England) Barnsley	Released	
26 January 2026	LB	(Guadeloupe)	Jérôme Roussillon	(France) Amiens	Free transfer	
28 January 2026	GK	(Australia)	Ashley Maynard-Brewer	(Scotland) Dundee United	Undisclosed	
29 January 2026	LW	(Cuba)	Onel Hernández	(England) Port Vale	Released	

=== Loans in ===
Date from	Position	Nationality	Name	From	Date until	Ref.
1 September 2025	RB	(England)	James Bree	(England) Southampton	17 January 2026	
12 January 2026	RB	(England)	Harry Clarke	(England) Ipswich Town	End of season	
21 January 2026	LB	(England)	Luke Chambers	(England) Liverpool	End of season	
28 January 2026	RW	(England)	Jayden Fevrier	(England) Stockport County	End of season	
29 January 2026	CB	(England)	Conor Coady	(Wales) Wrexham	End of season	

=== Loans out ===
Date from	Position	Nationality	Name	To	Date until	Ref.
30 July 2025	DF	(Uganda)	Nathan Asiimwe	(England) AFC Wimbledon	End of season	
8 August 2025	DF	(England)	Toby Bower	(England) Farnborough	End of season	
11 August 2025	MF	(Wales)	Terry Taylor	(England) Northampton Town	End of season	
14 August 2025	SS	(Morocco)	Gassan Ahadme	(England) Stevenage	End of season	
15 August 2025	FW	(Jamaica)	Kaheim Dixon	(England) Crawley Town	2 February 2026	
18 August 2025	DF	(England)	Alex Mitchell	(England) Plymouth Argyle	End of season	
22 August 2025	FW	(Sierra Leone)	Daniel Kanu	(England) Walsall	End of season	
23 August 2025	FW	(Republic of Ireland)	Patrick Casey	(England) Maidstone United	20 September 2025	
1 September 2025	FW	(England)	Micah Mbick	(England) Colchester United	End of season	
5 September 2025	DF	(England)	Zach Mitchell	(Scotland) Hibernian	19 January 2026	
17 October 2025	DF	(England)	Oliver Hobden	(England) Farnborough	19 January 2026	
24 October 2025	GK	(England)	Tommy Reid	(England) Sutton United	5 December 2025	
25 November 2025	GK	(England)	Lennon MacLorg	(England) AFC Sudbury	13 January 2026	
10 December 2025	FW	(Republic of Ireland)	Patrick Casey	(England) Dorking Wanderers	End of season	
19 January 2026	GK	(England)	Lennon MacLorg	(England) Whitehawk	End of season	
23 January 2026	GK	(England)	Tommy Reid	(England) Farnborough	End of season	
28 January 2026	RW	(Scotland)	Rob Apter	(England) Bolton Wanderers	End of season	
28 January 2026	FW	(England)	Tanto Olaofe	(England) Stockport County	End of season	
29 January 2026	MF	(England)	Henry Rylah	(Northern Ireland) Derry City	16 June 2026	
2 February 2026	MF	(Jamaica)	Karoy Anderson	(England) Blackpool	End of season	
5 February 2026	DF	(England)	Oliver Hobden	(England) Chatham Town	End of season	
20 February 2026	MF	(England)	Kai Enslin	(England) Dorking Wanderers	End of season	
13 March 2026	DF	(Fiji)	Josh Laqeretabua	(England) Bath City	End of season	
27 March 2026	DF	(England)	Mason Hunter	(England) Ramsgate	End of season	

== Friendlies ==
On Monday 2 June 2025, Charlton announced their first two pre-season friendlies against Dartford and Cambridge United. On 19 June 2025, Charlton announced their third and fourth pre-season friendlies and that they will return to Slovenia for a pre-season training camp ahead of the 2025–26 campaign. While there, they will face HNK Gorica in a behind-closed-doors friendly. They also announced that, on their return, they would face National League outfit Wealdstone. On Tuesday 24 June 2025, Charlton announced their fifth friendly against Southend United. On Friday 27 June 2025, Charlton announced their sixth and final friendly against Ipswich Town.

12 July 2025 Friendly	Dartford	2–3	Charlton Athletic	Dartford
15:00 BST	Jones 10'; Carruthers 36' (pen.)	Report	Kanu 5'; Docherty 26' (pen.); Mbick 84'	Stadium: Princes Park; Attendance: 3,584; Referee: Luke Scott

19 July 2025 Friendly	HNK Gorica	0–2	Charlton Athletic	Kranjska Gora, Slovenia
11:00 BST		Report	Matijaš 83' (o.g.); Fullah 86'	Stadium: Kranjska Gora; Attendance: 0 Referee: Markez Aljosa

23 July 2025 Friendly	Wealdstone	0–3	Charlton Athletic	Ruislip
18:30 BST		Report	Olaofe 15' (pen.); Kanu 35' (pen.); Carey 53'	Stadium: Grosvenor Vale; Attendance: 675; Referee: Sam Mulhall

26 July 2025 Friendly	Cambridge United	1–1	Charlton Athletic	Cambridge
15:00 BST	Hoddle 70'	Report	Leaburn 31'	Stadium: Cledara Abbey Stadium; Attendance: 2,003; Referee: Neil Hair

29 July 2025 Friendly	Ipswich Town	2–1	Charlton Athletic	Colchester
19:45 BST	Clarke 51'; Al-Hamadi 58'	Report	Olaofe 55'	Stadium: JobServe Community Stadium; Referee: Alex Chilowicz

2 August 2025 Friendly	Southend United	0–3	Charlton Athletic	Southend-on-Sea
15:00 BST		Report	Carey 19'; Ahadme 48', 50'	Stadium: Roots Hall; Attendance: 2,696; Referee: Robert Claussen

== Competitions ==
=== Overall record ===
Competition	First match	Last match	Starting round	Final position	Record							
Competition	First match	Last match	Starting round	Final position	Pld	W	D	L	GF	GA	GD	Win %
Championship	9 August 2025	2 May 2026	Matchday 1	19th	46	13	14	19	44	58	−14	28.26
FA Cup	10 January 2026	10 January 2026	Third round	Third round	1	0	0	1	1	5	−4	0.00
EFL Cup	12 August 2025	26 August 2025	First round	Second round	2	1	0	1	4	4	+0	50.00
Total					49	14	14	21	49	67	−18	28.57

Last updated: 2 May 2026
Source: Soccerway

=== Championship ===
==== League table ====
Pos	Team	Pld	W	D	L	GF	GA	GD	Pts
17	Stoke City	46	15	10	21	51	56	−5	55
18	Portsmouth	46	14	13	19	49	64	−15	55
19	Charlton Athletic	46	13	14	19	44	58	−14	53
20	Blackburn Rovers	46	13	13	20	42	56	−14	52
21	West Bromwich Albion	46	13	14	19	48	58	−10	51 (Note: West Bromwich Albion were deducted two points on 24 April 2026 for breaching PSR rules.)

Source: EFL Official Website
Rules for classification: 1) Points; 2) Goal difference; 3) Number of goals scored; 4) Head-to-head results; 5) Wins; 6) Away goals; 7) Penalty points (sec 9.5); 8) Number of 12-point sending off offences; 9) Play-off (only if needed to determine promotion/relegation)

==== Result summary ====
Overall								Home						Away					
Pld	W	D	L	GF	GA	GD	Pts	W	D	L	GF	GA	GD	W	D	L	GF	GA	GD
46	13	14	19	44	58	−14	53	9	4	10	23	26	−3	4	10	9	21	32	−11

Last updated: 2 May 2026.

==== Results by round ====
Round	1	2	3	4	5	6	7	8	9	10	11	12	13	14	15	16	17	18	19	20	21	22	23	24	25	26	27	28	29	30	31	32	19^{1}	33	34	35	36	37	38	39	40	41	42	43	44	45	46
Ground	H	A	H	A	H	A	H	A	A	H	A	A	H	H	A	H	A	A	H	H	A	H	A	A	H	A	H	H	A	A	H	H	H	A	A	H	H	A	A	H	H	A	H	A	H	H	A
Result	W	D	L	L	D	W	W	D	L	W	W	D	D	W	L	L	L	L	P	L	D	W	L	L	D	D	W	L	L	W	D	W	L	D	D	L	W	W	D	L	L	D	L	D	L	W	L
Position	7	10	14	16	18	12	7	9	13	9	5	6	8	6	9	13	16	17	17	19	17	17	17	20	19	19	18	18	19	18	18	18	18	17	18	18	18	17	18	18	18	18	18	19	21	19	19
Points	3	4	4	4	5	8	11	12	12	15	18	19	20	23	23	23	23	23	23	23	24	27	27	27	28	29	32	32	32	35	36	39	39	40	41	41	44	47	48	48	48	49	49	50	50	53	53

Updated to match(es) played on 2 May 2026. Source:
A = Away; H = Home; W = Win; D = Draw; L = Loss; P = postponed
Notes:
^{1} Matchday 19 (vs Portsmouth) was originally abandoned on 6 December 2025 due to a medical emergency before being rearranged for 17 February 2026.

==== Matches ====
The 2025–26 season fixtures were released on Thursday 26 June 2025.

9 August 2025 1	Charlton Athletic	1–0	Watford	Charlton
12:30 BST	Knibbs 90+4'	Report		Stadium: The Valley; Attendance: 21,778; Referee: Stephen Martin
Note: Live on Sky Sports+

16 August 2025 2	Bristol City	0–0	Charlton Athletic	Bristol
15:00 BST		Report		Stadium: Ashton Gate; Attendance: 24,721; Referee: Benjamin Speedie

23 August 2025 3	Charlton Athletic	0–1	Leicester City	Charlton
12:30 BST		Report	Fatawu 48'	Stadium: The Valley; Attendance: 22,183; Referee: Dean Whitestone
Note: Live on Sky Sports Football

30 August 2025 4	Queens Park Rangers	3–1	Charlton Athletic	Shepherd's Bush
12:30 BST	Smyth 8'; Saitō 84'; Kone 90+7'	Report	Apter 54'	Stadium: MATRADE Loftus Road Stadium; Attendance: 16,875; Referee: Andrew Kitchen
Note: Live on Sky Sports+

13 September 2025 5	Charlton Athletic	1–1	Millwall	Charlton
12:30 BST	Carey 40'	Report	Bangura-Williams 88'	Stadium: The Valley; Attendance: 23,293; Referee: Robert Madley
Note: Live on Sky Sports Football

20 September 2025 6	Sheffield United	0–1	Charlton Athletic	Sheffield
15:00 BST		Report	Olaofe 90'	Stadium: Bramall Lane; Attendance: 30,165; Referee: Ben Toner

27 September 2025 7	Charlton Athletic	3–0	Blackburn Rovers	Charlton
15:00 BST	Gillesphey 31'; Carey 78'; Bree 90+4'	Report		Stadium: The Valley; Attendance: 19,004; Referee: Anthony Backhouse

30 September 2025 8	Derby County	1–1	Charlton Athletic	Derby
20:00 BST	Clarke 79'	Report	Bree 37'	Stadium: Pride Park Stadium; Attendance: 25,966; Referee: Gavin Ward
Note: Live on Sky Sports Football

4 October 2025 9	Preston North End	2–0	Charlton Athletic	Preston
15:00 BST	Small 67'; Jebbison 80'	Report		Stadium: Deepdale; Attendance: 14,991; Referee: James Linington

18 October 2025 10	Charlton Athletic	2–1	Sheffield Wednesday	Charlton
15:00 BST	Carey 17'; Burke 45+1'	Report	J. Lowe 69'	Stadium: The Valley; Attendance: 23,009; Referee: Tom Reeves

21 October 2025 11	Ipswich Town	0–3	Charlton Athletic	Ipswich
19:45 BST		Report	Carey 52'; Gillesphey 55'; Leaburn 64'	Stadium: Portman Road; Attendance: 28,006; Referee: Farai Hallam

25 October 2025 12	Hull City	1–1	Charlton Athletic	Kingston upon Hull
15:00 BST	Gelhardt 46'	Report	Berry 90+1'	Stadium: MKM Stadium; Attendance: 20,804; Referee: Andrew Kitchen

1 November 2025 13	Charlton Athletic	1–1	Swansea City	Charlton
15:00 GMT	Kelman 46'	Report	Idah 64'	Stadium: The Valley; Attendance: 20,405; Referee: David Webb

4 November 2025 14	Charlton Athletic	1–0	West Bromwich Albion	Charlton
19:45 GMT	Carey 90+5'	Report		Stadium: The Valley; Attendance: 17,147; Referee: Lewis Smith

8 November 2025 15	Wrexham	1–0	Charlton Athletic	Wrexham
15:00 GMT	Windass 77' (pen.)	Report		Stadium: Racecourse Ground; Attendance: 11,873; Referee: Leigh Doughty

22 November 2025 16	Charlton Athletic	1–5	Southampton	Charlton
12:30 GMT	Jones 45+1'	Report	Manning 14'; Armstrong 16'; Jander 20'; Azaz 22', 43'	Stadium: The Valley; Attendance: 22,708; Referee: Stephen Martin
Note: Live on Sky Sports+

25 November 2025 17	Stoke City	3–0	Charlton Athletic	Stoke-on-Trent
19:45 GMT	Thomas 3', 34'; Manhoef 5'	Report		Stadium: Bet365 Stadium; Attendance: 21,105; Referee: Tom Neild

29 November 2025 18	Coventry City	3–1	Charlton Athletic	Coventry
15:00 GMT	Eccles 40'; Simms 44', 76'	Report	Knibbs 13'	Stadium: Coventry Building Society Arena; Attendance: 31,141; Referee: David Webb

6 December 2025 19	Charlton Athletic	A–A	Portsmouth	Charlton
12:30 GMT		Report		Stadium: The Valley; Referee: Matthew Donohue
Note: Live on Sky Sports+. Game abandoned in the 12th minute due to a medical emergency.

9 December 2025 20	Charlton Athletic	1–2	Middlesbrough	Charlton
19:45 GMT	Edmundson 81' (o.g.)	Report	McGree 33'; Whittaker 45+3'	Stadium: The Valley; Attendance: 17,258; Referee: Oliver Langford

13 December 2025 21	Birmingham City	1–1	Charlton Athletic	Birmingham
15:00 GMT	Klarer 28'	Report	Campbell 67'	Stadium: St Andrew's; Attendance: 26,822; Referee: Andrew Kitchen

20 December 2025 22	Charlton Athletic	1–0	Oxford United	Charlton
15:00 GMT	Kelman 78'	Report		Stadium: The Valley; Attendance: 19,594; Referee: Elliot Bell

26 December 2025 23	Norwich City	1–0	Charlton Athletic	Norwich
15:00 GMT	Makama 61'	Report		Stadium: Carrow Road; Attendance: 26,594; Referee: Matthew Donohue

29 December 2025 24	Portsmouth	2–1	Charlton Athletic	Portsmouth
19:45 GMT	Shaughnessy 69'; Yang Min-hyeok 90+8'	Report	Knibbs 90+6'	Stadium: Fratton Park; Attendance: 20,401; Referee: Paul Tierney

1 January 2026 25	Charlton Athletic	1–1	Coventry City	Charlton
15:00 GMT	Rankin-Costello 69'	Report	Simms 3'	Stadium: The Valley; Attendance: 20,789; Referee: Josh Smith

4 January 2026 26	Blackburn Rovers	2–2	Charlton Athletic	Blackburn
15:00 GMT	Baradji 37', 77'	Report	Kelman 28', 34' (pen.)	Stadium: Ewood Park; Attendance: 11,367; Referee: David Webb

17 January 2026 27	Charlton Athletic	1–0	Sheffield United	Charlton
15:00 GMT	Carey 46'	Report		Stadium: The Valley; Attendance: 19,647; Referee: Oliver Langford

20 January 2026 28	Charlton Athletic	1–2	Derby County	Charlton
19:45 GMT	Campbell 67'	Report	Gillesphey 17' (o.g.); Clarke 60'	Stadium: The Valley; Attendance: 16,266; Referee: James Linington

24 January 2026 29	Millwall	4–0	Charlton Athletic	Bermondsey
12:30 GMT	Ramsay 7' (o.g.); Taylor 81'; Cundle 90+2'; Emakhu 90+3'	Report		Stadium: The Den; Attendance: 19,004; Referee: Gavin Ward
Note: Live on Sky Sports Football

31 January 2026 30	Leicester City	0–2	Charlton Athletic	Leicester
12:30 GMT		Report	Carey 36'; Dykes 45+4'	Stadium: King Power Stadium; Attendance: 28,730; Referee: Andrew Kitchen
Note: Live on Sky Sports+

6 February 2026 31	Charlton Athletic	0–0	Queens Park Rangers	Charlton
20:01 GMT		Report		Stadium: The Valley; Attendance: 21,290; Referee: Tom Nield
Note: Live on Sky Sports Football

11 February 2026 32	Charlton Athletic	1–0	Stoke City	Charlton
19:45 GMT	Campbell 81'	Report		Stadium: The Valley; Attendance: 14,836; Referee: Anthony Backhouse

17 February 2026 19	Charlton Athletic	1–3	Portsmouth	Charlton
19:45 GMT	Fevrier 64'	Report	Devlin 22', 56'; Bishop 35' (pen.)	Stadium: The Valley; Attendance: 18,713; Referee: Leigh Doughty

21 February 2026 33	Southampton	1–1	Charlton Athletic	Southampton
15:00 GMT	Stewart 48'	Report	Carey 67'	Stadium: St Mary's Stadium; Attendance: 29,476; Referee: John Busby

24 February 2026 34	West Bromwich Albion	1–1	Charlton Athletic	West Bromwich
19:45 GMT	Campbell 45+3'	Report	Dykes 70'	Stadium: The Hawthorns; Attendance: 20,847; Referee: Sam Allison

28 February 2026 35	Charlton Athletic	0–1	Wrexham	Charlton
15:00 GMT		Report	Rathbone 30'	Stadium: The Valley; Attendance: 21,844; Referee: Farai Hallam

7 March 2026 36	Charlton Athletic	1–0	Birmingham City	Charlton
15:00 GMT	Kelman 74'	Report		Stadium: The Valley; Attendance: 18,541; Referee: James Linington

11 March 2026 37	Middlesbrough	0–1	Charlton Athletic	Middlesbrough
19:45 GMT		Report	Coady 59'	Stadium: Riverside Stadium; Attendance: 24,668; Referee: Adam Herczeg

14 March 2026 38	Oxford United	1–1	Charlton Athletic	Oxford
12:30 GMT	Brannagan 57' (pen.)	Report	Kelman 90+3' (pen.)	Stadium: Kassam Stadium; Attendance: 11,325; Referee: Matthew Donohue
Note: Live on Sky Sports+

21 March 2026 39	Charlton Athletic	0–1	Norwich City	Charlton
15:00 GMT		Report	Mattsson 5'	Stadium: The Valley; Attendance: 23,008; Referee: Will Finnie

3 April 2026 40	Charlton Athletic	1–2	Bristol City	Charlton
15:00 BST	Dykes 30'	Report	Twine 11'; Eile 55'	Stadium: The Valley; Attendance: 20,925; Referee: Ben Toner

6 April 2026 41	Watford	1–1	Charlton Athletic	Watford
15:00 BST	Irankunda 74'	Report	Godden 62'	Stadium: Vicarage Road; Attendance: 19,961; Referee: Andrew Kitchen
Note: Live on Sky Sports Football

11 April 2026 42	Charlton Athletic	1–2	Preston North End	Charlton
15:00 BST	Rankin-Costello 18'	Report	Dobbin 25'; Potts 65'	Stadium: The Valley; Attendance: 18,902; Referee: John Busby

18 April 2026 43	Sheffield Wednesday	1–1	Charlton Athletic	Sheffield
15:00 BST	Otegbayo 76'	Report	Godden 49'	Stadium: Hillsborough Stadium; Attendance: 23,538; Referee: Thomas Parsons

22 April 2026 44	Charlton Athletic	1–2	Ipswich Town	Charlton
19:45 BST	Docherty 1'	Report	Furlong 36'; Philogene 58' (pen.)	Stadium: The Valley; Attendance: 19,706; Referee: Robert Madley
Note: Live on Sky Sports Football

25 April 2026 45	Charlton Athletic	2–1	Hull City	Charlton
12:30 BST	Kelman 20'; Fevrier 68'	Report	Egan 45+7'	Stadium: The Valley; Attendance: 20,671; Referee: Tom Nield
Note: Live on Sky Sports+

2 May 2026 46	Swansea City	3–1	Charlton Athletic	Swansea
12:30 BST	Idah 74', 82'; Walta 88'	Report	Leaburn 79'	Stadium: Swansea.com Stadium; Attendance: 19,245; Referee: Will Finnie

=== FA Cup ===
The third round draw was made on Monday 8 December 2025. On Friday 12 December 2025, the club confirmed the date and time of their third round fixture.

10 January 2026 Third round	Charlton Athletic	1–5	Chelsea	Charlton
20:00 GMT	Leaburn 57'	Report	Hato 45+4'; Adarabioyo 50'; Guiu 62'; Neto 90+1'; Fernández 90+4' (pen.)	Stadium: The Valley; Attendance: 26,475; Referee: Chris Kavanagh
Note: Live on TNT Sports 1 and Discovery+

=== EFL Cup ===
The first round draw was made on Thursday 26 June 2025. On Friday 4 July 2025, the date of the first round was announced. The second round draw was made on Wednesday 13 August 2025. On Friday 15 August 2025, the date of the second round was announced.

12 August 2025 First round	Charlton Athletic	3–1	Stevenage	Charlton
19:45 BST	Leaburn 27'; Fullah 36'; Berry 77'	Report	Freestone 86'	Stadium: The Valley; Attendance: 4,092; Referee: Craig Hicks

26 August 2025 Second round	Cambridge United	3–1	Charlton Athletic	Cambridge
19:30 BST	Brophy 15'; Kouassi 29'; Bradshaw 55'	Report	Fullah 44'	Stadium: Cledara Abbey Stadium; Attendance: 3,231; Referee: David Rock
Note: Live on Sky Sports+

=== Kent Senior Cup ===
7 October 2025 Second round	Margate	2–3	Charlton Athletic	Margate
19:45 BST	Walsh 33'; Peters 38'	Report	Sol-Loza 15', 76'; Casey 77'	Stadium: Hartsdown Park; Attendance: 651; Referee: Michael Butcher

9 December 2025 Quarter-finals	Maidstone United	3–2	Charlton Athletic	Maidstone
19:45 GMT	Gilbert 20', 64'; Moore 80'	Report	Bower 10'; Kuezynski 90+2'	Stadium: Gallagher Stadium; Attendance: 335; Referee: Dan Blades

=== London Senior Cup ===
11 November 2025 Second round	Hanwell Town	3–2	Charlton Athletic	Perivale
19:45 GMT	Rice 5'; Pendlebury 32'; Bettamer 76'	Report	Casey 68', 72'	Stadium: Reynolds Field; Attendance: 113; Referee: Morgan Conn
