= Sonny Carey =

English footballer (born 2001)

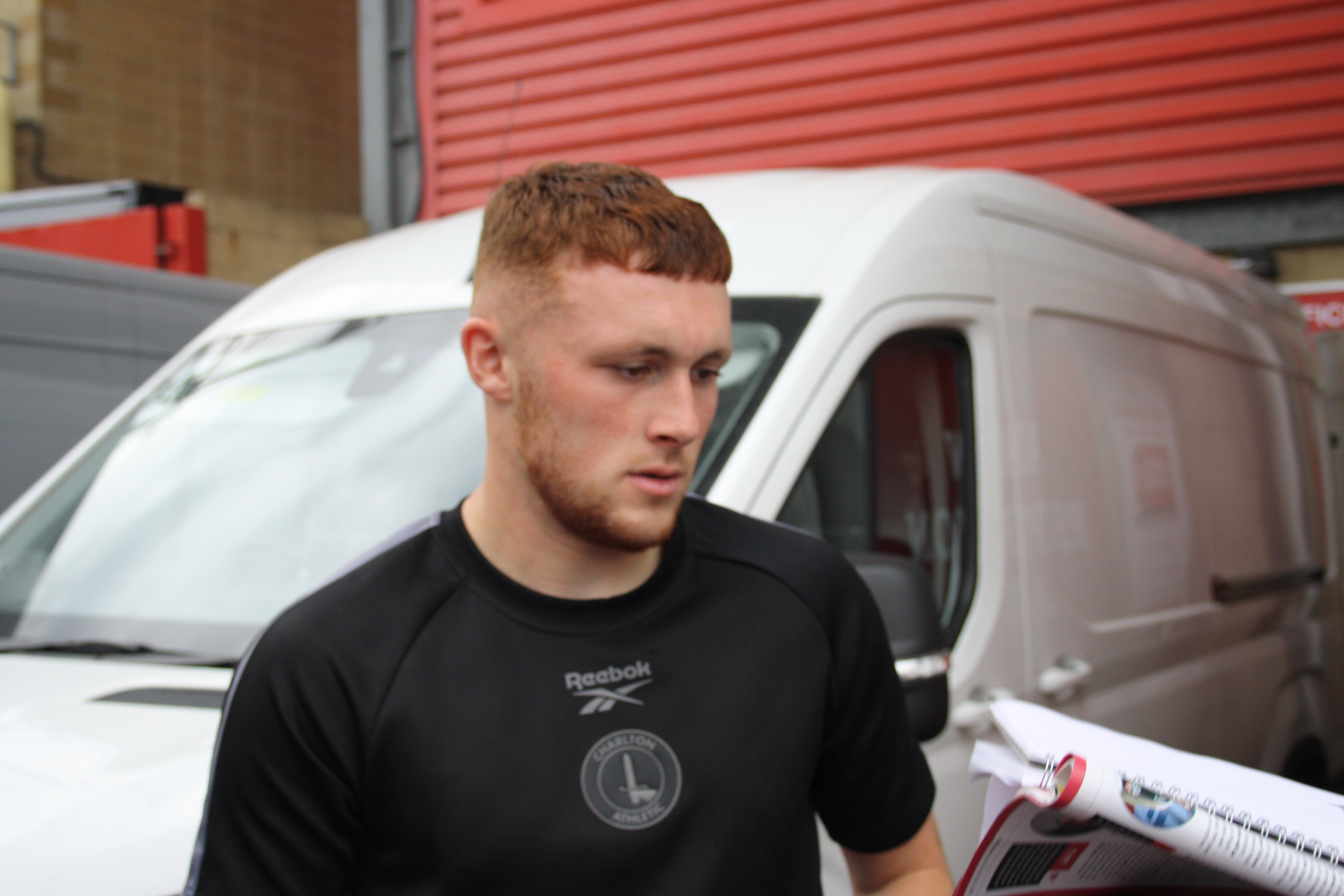
- Carey in 2025

Personal information
- Full name: Sonny Jack Carey
- Date of birth: 20 January 2001 (age 25)
- Place of birth: Norwich, England
- Height: 1.84 m (6 ft 0 in)
- Position: Midfielder

Team information
- Current team: Charlton Athletic
- Number: 14

Youth career
- 2010–2017: Norwich City

Senior career*
Years	Team	Apps	(Gls)
2017–2018	Norwich United	5	(0)
2018–2019	Wroxham	34	(16)
2019–2021	King's Lynn Town	63	(8)
2021–2025	Blackpool	116	(17)
2025–	Charlton Athletic	57	(8)
- * Club domestic league appearances and goals as of 17:10, 21 November 2026 (UTC)

Sonny Jack Carey (born 20 January 2001) is an English professional footballer who plays as a midfielder for EFL Championship club Charlton Athletic.

== Career ==
=== Early career ===
Born in Norwich, Carey spent his early career with Norwich City, where he was in the Academy between 2010 and 2017. Following on from his release from Norwich, he had trials at Cambridge United and Oxford United and also represented England Colleges FA team during the 2018–19 season.

In 2017, Carey signed for Isthmian League North Division side Norwich United. Whilst at Norwich United, Carey primarily played for the reserves in the Eastern Counties League Division One, eventually making five league appearances for the first team, as Norwich United finished bottom of the league. Ahead of the 2018–19 season, Carey joined Wroxham in the Eastern Counties League Premier Division, scoring 16 goals in 34 league appearances during his one season at the club. In June 2019, Carey signed for King's Lynn Town after training with the club for a number of months prior.

=== Blackpool ===
Carey signed for Blackpool in June 2021. He scored his first goal in the Football League in Blackpool's 3–1 victory over Peterborough United on 18 December 2021.

=== Charlton Athletic ===
On 6 June 2025, it was announced that Carey would sign for Charlton Athletic, on a three-year deal, upon the expiration of his contract with Blackpool on 30 June 2025.

Carey scored his first goal for Charlton in a 1–1 draw against rivals Millwall on 13 September 2025 at The Valley. Carey quickly became a fan-favourite amongst Charlton supporters.

As well as being an ever-present for the club, having played in all 46 league games, Carey ended the 2025–26 season as Charlton's top scorer with eight goals.

== Career statistics ==
As of match played 21 November 2026

Appearances and goals by club, season and competition
Club	Season	League			FA Cup		EFL Cup		Other		Total	
Club	Season	Division	Apps	Goals	Apps	Goals	Apps	Goals	Apps	Goals	Apps	Goals
King's Lynn Town	2019–20	National League North	21	3	3	1	—		4 (Note: Appearances in FA Trophy)	1	28	5
King's Lynn Town	2020–21	National League	42	5	2	1	—		2	0	46	6
King's Lynn Town	Total		63	8	5	2	0	0	6	1	74	11
Blackpool	2021–22	Championship	11	1	0	0	2	0	—		13	1
Blackpool	2022–23	Championship	37	3	2	0	1	0	—		40	3
Blackpool	2023–24	League One	35	5	3	0	2	0	3 (Note: Appearance(s) in the EFL Trophy.)	1	43	6
Blackpool	2024–25	League One	33	8	1	2	2	0	1	1	37	11
Blackpool	Total		116	17	6	2	7	0	4	2	133	21
Charlton Athletic	2025–26	Championship	46	8	1	0	0	0	—		47	8
Charlton Athletic	2026–27	Championship	11	0	0	0	1	1	—		12	1
Charlton Athletic	Total		57	8	1	0	1	1	0	0	59	9
Career total			236	33	12	4	8	1	10	3	266	41
