= Cian Dillon (footballer) =

Irish association football player (born 2006)

Personal information
- Date of birth: 4 April 2006 (age 20)
- Place of birth: Tallaght, Dublin, Ireland
- Position: Forward

Team information
- Current team: Dundalk
- Number: 9

Youth career
- Jobstown Celtic
- –2016: Greenhills Boys
- 2016–2024: Shamrock Rovers

Senior career*
Years	Team	Apps	(Gls)
2024–2025	Shamrock Rovers	2	(0)
2025–2026	Queens Park Rangers	0	(0)
2025	→ Enfield Town (loan)	6	(2)
2025	→ Torquay United (loan)	4	(0)
2025–2026	→ Enfield Town (loan)	6	(1)
2026–	Dundalk	12	(3)

International career^{‡}
2024–2025	Republic of Ireland U19	10	(6)
2025–	Republic of Ireland U21	2	(0)
- * Club domestic league appearances and goals as of 12:31, 5 October 2026 (UTC) ‡ National team caps and goals as of 17:20, 16 August 2025 (UTC)

Cian Dillon (born 4 April 2006) is an Irish professional footballer who plays as a forward for Premier Division side Dundalk. He is a Republic of Ireland youth international.

== Club career ==
=== Early career ===
From Tallaght, he played as a child for Jobstown Celtic before moving to Greenhills Boys AFC. He joined Shamrock Rovers at the age of ten years-old.

=== Shamrock Rovers ===
Dillon scored his first senior goal for Shamrock Rovers in a 2–0 win over Longford Town in the Leinster Senior Cup on 22 January 2024. Dillon made his first league start away to Drogheda United in 2024.

=== Queens Park Rangers ===
He joined EFL Championship club Queens Park Rangers on 16 January 2025. He was part of the QPR U21 side which won the 2024–25 Premier League Cup. He later joined Enfield Town of the National League South on loan in March 2025 until the end of the 2024–25 season. He made his competitive debut for Queens Park Rangers the following season on 12 August 2025 as a second-half substitute in a 3–2 away defeat against Plymouth Argyle in the EFL Cup, making him the 1214th player to play for the club. On 2 October 2025, Dillon joined National League South club Torquay United on an initial one-month loan deal. On 5 November 2025, following a brief spell at Torquay, he returned to Enfield Town on a 28-day loan. On 3 December 2025, it was announced that the loan deal had been extended until 31 January 2026.

=== Dundalk ===
On 21 July 2026, Dillon joined Premier Division club Dundalk on a multi-year contract. On 15 August 2026, he scored his first goals for the club with a brace in an 8–0 win over non-league side Castlebar Celtic in the FAI Cup. On 30 October 2026, he scored twice in a 3–1 win against his former club Shamrock Rovers at Oriel Park in the last game of the season.

== International career ==
He played for Republic of Ireland U19 team in 2024, his appearances including a goal against Azerbaijan U19 in November 2024. He made his debut for the Republic of Ireland U21s against Croatia U21 in June 2025.

== Career statistics ==
As of match played on 30 October 2026

Appearances and goals by club, season and competition
Club	Season	League			National Cup (Note: Includes FAI Cup & FA Cup)		League Cup (Note: Includes EFL Cup)		Other		Total	
Club	Season	Division	Apps	Goals	Apps	Goals	Apps	Goals	Apps	Goals	Apps	Goals
Shamrock Rovers	2024	LOI Premier Division	2	0	0	0	—		3 (Note: Appearances in the Leinster Senior Cup)	1	5	1
Queens Park Rangers	2024–25	EFL Championship	0	0	—		—		—		0	0
Queens Park Rangers	2025–26	EFL Championship	0	0	0	0	1	0	—		1	0
Queens Park Rangers	Total		0	0	0	0	1	0	–		1	0
Enfield Town (loan)	2024–25	National League South	6	2	—		—		—		6	2
Torquay United (loan)	2025–26	National League South	4	0	—		—		—		4	0
Enfield Town (loan)	2025–26	National League South	6	1	—		—		0 (Note: Appearances in the FA Trophy)	0	6	1
Dundalk	2026	LOI Premier Division	12	3	2	2	—		—		14	5
Career total			30	5	2	2	1	0	5	1	38	9

== Honours ==
=== Club ===
Queens Park Rangers Development Squad

- London Senior Cup: 2025–26
