= Ibrahim Fullah =

English footballer (born 2007)

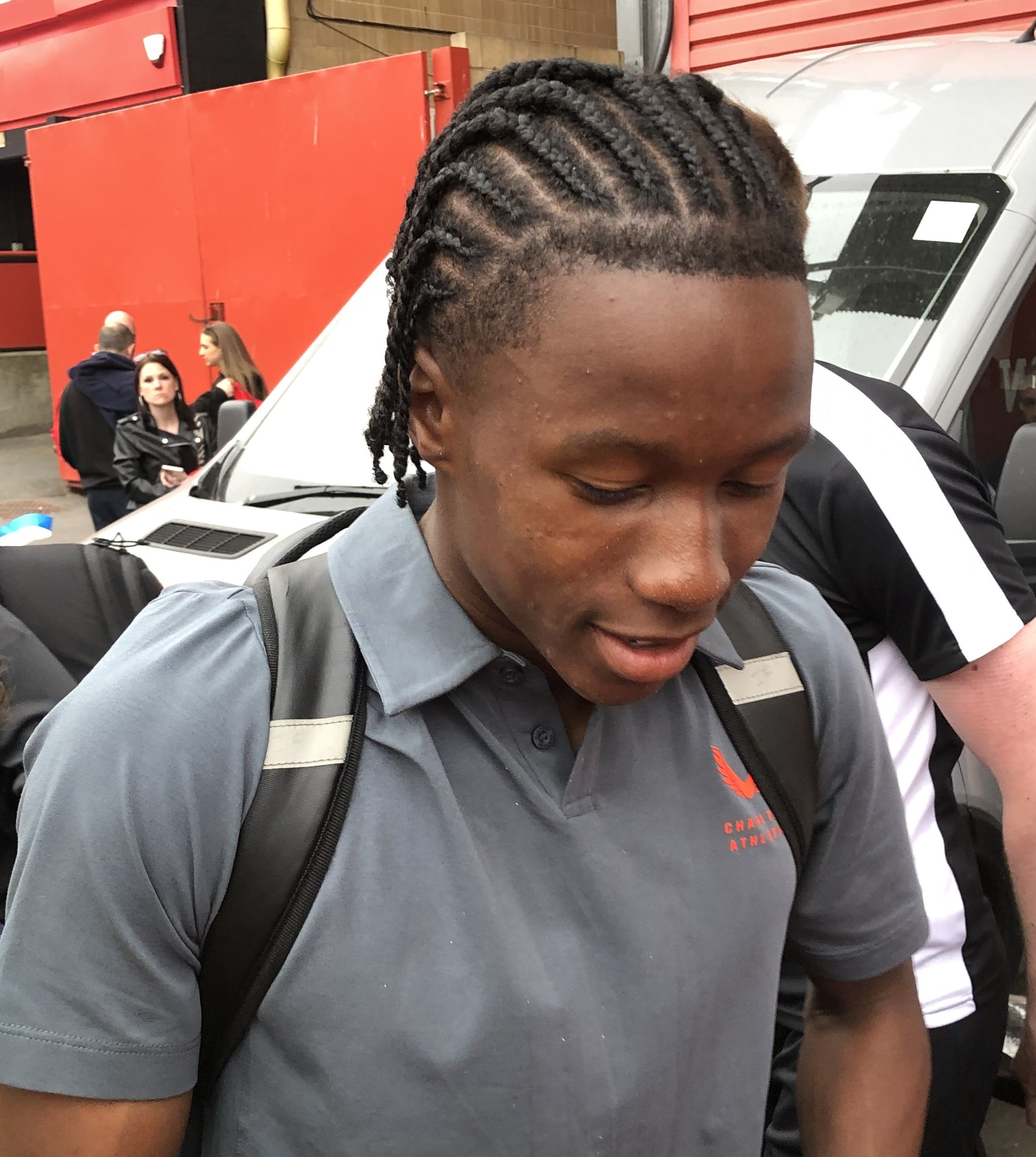
- Fullah in 2025

Personal information
- Full name: Ibrahim Mohamed Fullah
- Date of birth: 5 April 2007 (age 19)
- Place of birth: Lewisham, England
- Position: Midfielder

Team information
- Current team: Milton Keynes Dons (on loan from Charlton Athletic)
- Number: 22

Youth career
- 2017–2025: Charlton Athletic

Senior career*
| Years | Team | Apps | (Gls) |
| 2025– | Charlton Athletic | 12 | (0) |
| 2026– | → Milton Keynes Dons (loan) | 9 | (0) |
- * Club domestic league appearances and goals as of 17:10, 21 November 2026 (UTC)

Ibrahim Mohamed Fullah (born 5 April 2007) is an English professional footballer who plays as a midfielder for EFL League One club Milton Keynes Dons, on loan from EFL Championship club Charlton Athletic.

== Career ==
=== Charlton Athletic ===
Having come through the youth system of Charlton Athletic since joining at U10 level, Fullah signed his first professional deal with the club on 17 April 2024. before signing a new long-term contract with the club on 15 April 2025.

On 3 May 2025, Fullah made his professional debut for Charlton Athletic in League One, coming off the bench in the 85th minute in a 3–1 final day victory over Burton Albion. A year later, after a breakthrough 2025–26 season, he was named Charlton's Young Player of the Year.

==== Milton Keynes Dons (loan) ====
On 1 September 2026, Fullah signed a new contract until 2029 and was loaned out to League One club Milton Keynes Dons for the duration of the 2026–27 season.

== Personal life ==
Born in England, Fullah is of Sierra Leonean descent and holds dual-citizenship.

== Career statistics ==
As of match played 21 November 2026

Appearances and goals by club, season and competition
| Club | Season | League | | | FA Cup | | EFL Cup | | Other | | Total | |
| Club | Season | Division | Apps | Goals | Apps | Goals | Apps | Goals | Apps | Goals | Apps | Goals |
|---|---|---|---|---|---|---|---|---|---|---|---|---|
| Charlton Athletic | 2024–25 | League One | 1 | 0 | 0 | 0 | 0 | 0 | 0 | 0 | 1 | 0 |
| Charlton Athletic | 2025–26 | Championship | 11 | 0 | 0 | 0 | 2 | 2 | — | | 13 | 2 |
| Charlton Athletic | 2026–27 | Championship | 0 | 0 | — | | 0 | 0 | — | | 0 | 0 |
| Charlton Athletic | Charlton Athletic total | | 12 | 0 | 0 | 0 | 2 | 2 | 0 | 0 | 14 | 2 |
| Milton Keynes Dons (loan) | 2026–27 | League One | 9 | 0 | 1 | 0 | — | | 3 (Note: Appearance(s) in EFL Trophy) | 1 | 13 | 1 |
| Career total | | | 21 | 0 | 1 | 0 | 2 | 2 | 3 | 1 | 27 | 3 |

== Honours ==
Individual

- Charlton Athletic Young Player of the Year: 2025–26
