= Alan Mwamba =

English footballer (born 2006)

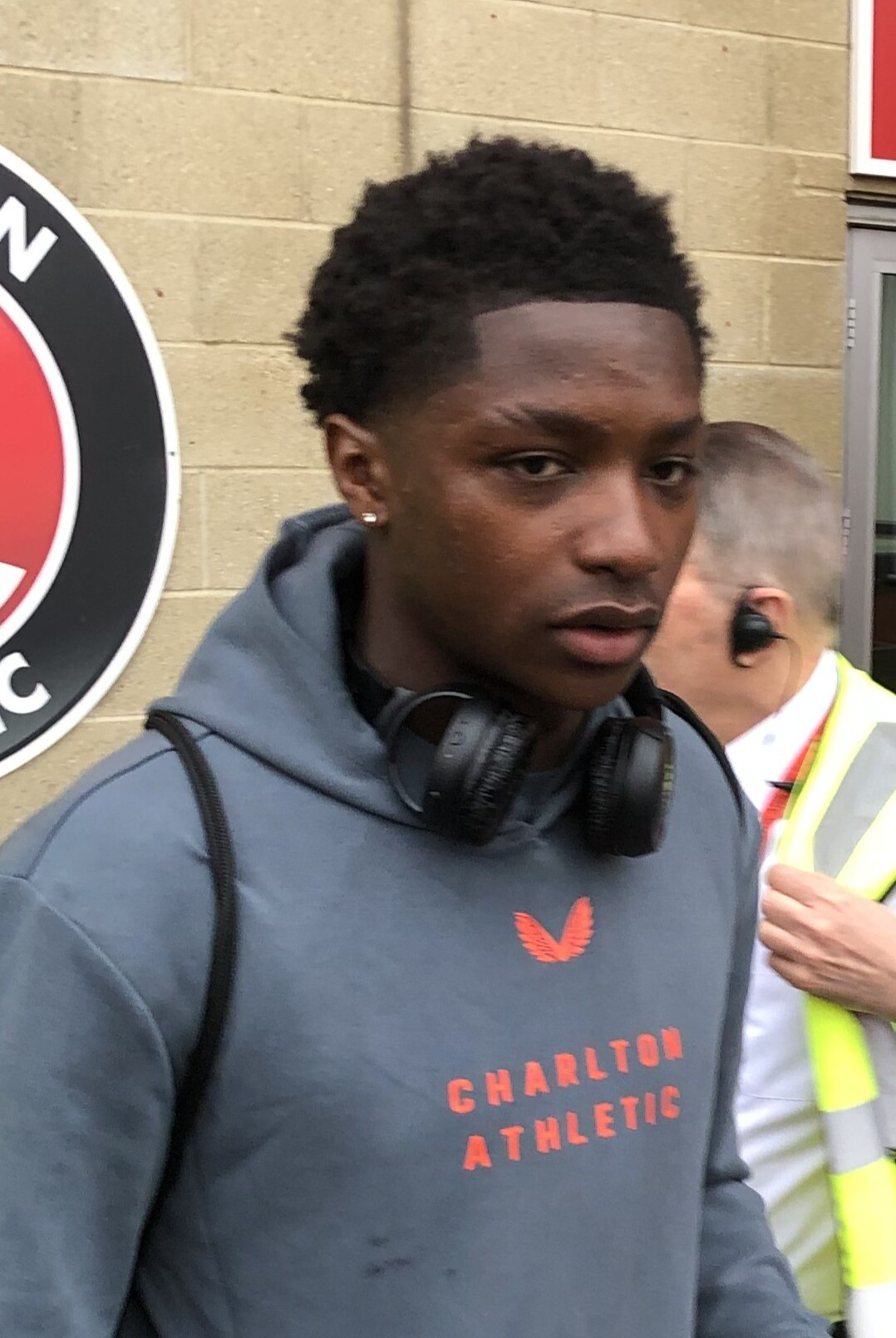
- Mwamba in 2025

Personal information
- Full name: Alan Isaac Mwamba
- Date of birth: 15 September 2006 (age 20)
- Place of birth: Croydon, England
- Position: Midfielder

Team information
- Current team: Charlton Athletic
- Number: 32

Youth career
- 2018–2025: Charlton Athletic

Senior career*
Years	Team	Apps	(Gls)
2024–	Charlton Athletic	8	(0)
- * Club domestic league appearances and goals as of 17:10, 21 November 2026 (UTC)

Alan Isaac Mwamba is an English professional footballer who plays as a midfielder for EFL Championship club Charlton Athletic.

== Career ==
Coming through the youth system of Charlton Athletic, having joined the club at U12 level, Mwamba was confirmed as a scholar ahead of the 2023/24 season.

On 5 July 2024, Mwamba signed his first professional deal with the club.

Mwamba made his professional debut for the club as an 18–year–old, coming off the bench in the 88th minute of a 2–1 EFL Trophy victory away at Cambridge United on 17 September 2024.

On 3 November 2025, Mwamba signed a new long-term contract with the club.

== Career statistics ==
As of match played 21 November 2026

Appearances and goals by club, season and competition
Club	Season	League			FA Cup		EFL Cup		Other		Total	
Club	Season	Division	Apps	Goals	Apps	Goals	Apps	Goals	Apps	Goals	Apps	Goals
Charlton Athletic	2024–25	League One	0	0	0	0	0	0	1 (Note: One appearance in the EFL Trophy)	0	1	0
Charlton Athletic	2025–26	Championship	0	0	0	0	2	0	—		2	0
Charlton Athletic	2026–27	Championship	8	0	0	0	2	0	—		10	0
Charlton Athletic	Charlton Athletic total		8	0	0	0	4	0	1	0	13	0
Career total			8	0	0	0	4	0	1	0	13	0
