= 1994–95 Charlton Athletic F.C. season =

Charlton Athletic
1994–95 season
- Chairman: Martin Simons
- Manager: Alan Curbishley; Steve Gritt
- Stadium: The Valley
- First Division: 15th
- FA Cup: Third round
- League Cup: Second round
- Top goalscorer: League: David Whyte (18); All: David Whyte (20)
- Average home league attendance: 10,211
Home colours	Away colours

During the 1994–95 English football season, Charlton Athletic F.C. competed in the Football League First Division.

== Season summary ==
Charlton started the campaign very poorly, managing only six wins before Christmas and were hovering towards the relegation places. Their form then started to improve into the new year with 7 wins from 15, picking up 23 points from the possible 45 during that steady run. Despite an inconsistent season, the Addicks avoided any danger of relegation and finished in 15th place.

== Kit ==
Charlton's kit was manufactured by Quaser and sponsored by Viglen.

== Final league table ==
Pos	Team	Pld	W	D	L	GF	GA	GD	Pts
13	Southend United	46	18	8	20	54	73	−19	62
14	Oldham Athletic	46	16	13	17	60	60	0	61
15	Charlton Athletic	46	16	11	19	58	66	−8	59
16	Luton Town	46	15	13	18	61	64	−3	58
17	Port Vale	46	15	13	18	58	64	−6	58

Rules for classification: 1) Points; 2) Goals scored; 3) Goal difference

== Results ==
Charlton Athletic's score comes first

=== Legend ===
Win	Draw	Loss

=== Football League First Division ===
Date	Opponent	Venue	Result	Attendance	Scorers
13 August 1994	Oldham Athletic	A	2–5	8,924	Robinson, Whyte
20 August 1994	Barnsley	H	2–2	8,171	Whyte, Chapple
27 August 1994	Portsmouth	A	1–1	10,566	Nelson
30 August 1994	Sheffield United	H	1–1	8,678	Brown (pen)
3 September 1994	Bristol City	H	3–2	9,019	Whyte (2), Mortimer
10 September 1994	Grimsby Town	A	1–0	3,970	Robson
14 September 1994	Stoke City	A	2–3	10,643	Grant, Nelson
17 September 1994	Swindon Town	H	1–0	9,794	Whyte
24 September 1994	Notts County	A	3–3	5,726	Nelson (2), Whyte
1 October 1994	Watford	H	3–0	8,417	Nelson, Grant, Whyte
8 October 1994	Reading	H	1–2	10,544	Robson
15 October 1994	Port Vale	A	2–0	7,707	Chapple, Whyte
22 October 1994	Burnley	H	1–2	9,436	Whyte
29 October 1994	Derby County	A	2–2	12,588	Grant (2)
1 November 1994	Sunderland	A	1–1	14,085	Grant
5 November 1994	Bolton Wanderers	H	1–2	9,793	Brown (pen)
13 November 1994	West Bromwich Albion	H	1–1	10,876	Grant
19 November 1994	Tranmere Rovers	A	1–1	7,567	Nelson
26 November 1994	Middlesbrough	H	0–2	10,019	
10 December 1994	Barnsley	A	1–2	5,465	Mortimer
17 December 1994	Oldham Athletic	H	2–0	8,970	Whyte, Jones
26 December 1994	Southend United	H	3–1	9,525	Whyte, Leaburn (2)
28 December 1994	Wolverhampton Wanderers	A	0–2	26,738	
1 January 1995	Millwall	H	1–1	18,184	Robinson
2 January 1995	Luton Town	A	1–0	7,642	Whyte
14 January 1995	Derby County	H	3–4	9,389	Pardew, Robson, Whyte
21 January 1995	Bolton Wanderers	A	1–5	10,516	Whyte
5 February 1995	West Bromwich Albion	A	1–0	12,084	Nelson
11 February 1995	Sunderland	H	1–0	12,380	Whyte
18 February 1995	Middlesbrough	A	0–1	16,301	
21 February 1995	Tranmere Rovers	H	0–1	11,860	
4 March 1995	Notts County	H	1–0	13,863	Mortimer
7 March 1995	Bristol City	A	1–2	6,118	Pardew
11 March 1995	Portsmouth	H	1–0	9,475	Leaburn
18 March 1995	Sheffield United	A	1–2	11,862	Pardew
21 March 1995	Grimsby Town	H	2–1	9,601	Robinson, Balmer
25 March 1995	Swindon Town	A	1–0	9,106	Grant
1 April 1995	Stoke City	H	0–0	10,008	
4 April 1995	Burnley	A	0–2	10,045	
8 April 1995	Millwall	A	1–3	9,506	Balmer
15 April 1995	Wolverhampton Wanderers	H	3–2	10,922	Whyte, Walsh, Mortimer
18 April 1995	Southend United	A	1–2	6,397	Whyte
22 April 1995	Luton Town	H	1–0	10,918	Whyte
29 April 1995	Port Vale	H	1–1	12,596	Brown
2 May 1995	Watford	A	0–2	6,024	
7 May 1995	Reading	A	1–2	12,137	Chandler

=== FA Cup ===
Round	Date	Opponent	Venue	Result	Attendance	Goalscorers
R3	7 January 1995	Chelsea	A	0–3	24,485	

=== League Cup ===
Round	Date	Opponent	Venue	Result	Attendance	Goalscorers
R2 First Leg	21 September 1994	Swindon Town	A	3–1	4,932	Nelson (2), Whyte
R2 Second Leg	27 September 1994	Swindon Town	H	1–4 (lost 4–5 on agg)	4,932	Whyte

== Players ==
=== First-team squad ===
Squad at end of season

Note: Flags indicate national team as defined under FIFA eligibility rules; some limited exceptions apply. Players may hold more than one non-FIFA nationality.

No.	Pos.	Nation	Player
—	GK	ENG	Mike Salmon
—	GK	USA	Mike Ammann
—	GK	AUS	Andy Petterson
—	DF	ENG	Steve Brown
—	DF	SCO	Stuart Balmer
—	DF	ENG	Richard Rufus
—	DF	ENG	Phil Chapple
—	DF	ENG	Alan McLeary
—	DF	ENG	Jamie Stuart
—	DF	ENG	Paul Sturgess
—	DF	ENG	Dean Chandler
—	DF	NOR	Tom Henning Hovi (on loan from HamKam)
—	MF	WAL	John Robinson (Note: Robinson was born in Bulawayo, Rhodesia (now Zimbabwe), but also qualified to represent Wales internationally and represented them at U-21 level before making his international debut for Wales in 1995.)
—	MF	SCO	Colin Walsh

No.	Pos.	Nation	Player
—	MF	ENG	Shaun Newton
—	MF	ENG	Keith Jones
—	MF	ENG	Alan Pardew
—	MF	ENG	Paul Mortimer
—	MF	ENG	Mark Robson
—	MF	ENG	Mickey Bennett
—	MF	ENG	Lee Bowyer
—	MF	ENG	Peter Garland
—	MF	ENG	Paul Linger
—	FW	ENG	Carl Leaburn
—	FW	ENG	Garry Nelson
—	FW	ENG	David Whyte
—	FW	GHA	Kim Grant
—	FW	ENG	Scott McGleish
