= 1995–96 Charlton Athletic F.C. season =

Charlton Athletic
1995–96 season
- Chairman: Richard Murray
- Manager: Alan Curbishley
- Stadium: The Valley
- First Division: 6th
- FA Cup: Fifth round
- League Cup: Third round
- Top goalscorer: League: Leaburn (9); All: Bowyer (14)
- Average home league attendance: 11,185
Home colours	Away colours	Third colours

During the 1995–96 English football season, Charlton Athletic F.C. competed in the Football League First Division.

== Season summary ==
In the summer of 1995, new chairman Richard Murray appointed Alan Curbishley as sole manager of Charlton. Under his sole leadership Charlton made an appearance in the playoffs in 1996 but were eliminated by Crystal Palace in the semi-finals.

Defender, Richard Rufus and midfielder, Lee Bowyer were both named in the PFA Team of the Year.

== Kit ==
Charlton's kit was manufactured by Quaser and sponsored by Viglen.

== Final league table ==
Pos	Team	Pld	W	D	L	GF	GA	GD	Pts	Qualification or relegation
4	Stoke City	46	20	13	13	60	49	+11	73	Qualification for the First Division play-offs
5	Leicester City (O, P)	46	19	14	13	66	60	+6	71	Qualification for the First Division play-offs
6	Charlton Athletic	46	17	20	9	57	45	+12	71	Qualification for the First Division play-offs
7	Ipswich Town	46	19	12	15	79	69	+10	69	
8	Huddersfield Town	46	17	12	17	61	58	+3	63	

Rules for classification: 1) Points; 2) Goals scored; 3) Goal difference
(O) Play-off winners; (P) Promoted

== Results ==
Charlton Athletic's score comes first

=== Legend ===
Win	Draw	Loss

=== Football League First Division ===
Date	Opponent	Venue	Result	Attendance	Scorers
12 August 1995	West Bromwich Albion	A	0–1	14,586	
19 August 1995	Birmingham City	H	3–1	9,692	Nelson, Bowyer, Grant
26 August 1995	Crystal Palace	A	1–1	14,124	Bowyer
29 August 1995	Watford	H	2–1	8,442	Bowyer, Leaburn
2 September 1995	Huddersfield Town	H	2–1	9,570	Newton, Stuart
9 September 1995	Tranmere Rovers	A	0–0	7,402	
12 September 1995	Sheffield United	A	0–2	9,448	
16 September 1995	Oldham Athletic	H	1–1	8,926	Leaburn
23 September 1995	Ipswich Town	A	5–1	13,000	Chapple, Leaburn (3, 1 pen), Linger
30 September 1995	Barnsley	H	1–1	11,219	Grant
7 October 1995	Grimsby Town	H	0–1	8,997	
14 October 1995	Leicester City	A	1–1	16,771	Leaburn
21 October 1995	Norwich City	H	1–1	13,369	Bowyer
29 October 1995	Luton Town	A	1–0	6,270	Nelson
5 November 1995	Sunderland	H	1–1	11,366	Newton
12 November 1995	Wolverhampton Wanderers	A	0–0	20,450	
18 November 1995	Derby County	A	0–2	12,963	
21 November 1995	Reading	H	2–1	7,840	Chapple, Robinson
25 November 1995	Port Vale	H	2–2	10,174	Mortimer (pen), Bowyer
2 December 1995	Grimsby Town	A	2–1	6,881	Grant, D Whyte (pen)
5 December 1995	Millwall	A	2–0	11,350	Grant (2)
9 December 1995	Ipswich Town	H	0–2	10,279	
16 December 1995	Barnsley	A	2–1	6,140	Robinson, Newton
26 December 1995	Portsmouth	H	2–1	11,686	Newton, Nelson
14 January 1996	Birmingham City	A	4–3	18,539	Edwards (own goal), Leaburn, Grant, Robinson
20 January 1996	West Bromwich Albion	H	4–1	11,864	Robinson (2), Stuart, Mortimer (pen)
4 February 1996	Crystal Palace	H	0–0	13,535	
10 February 1996	Watford	A	2–1	8,394	Robinson, Bowyer
17 February 1996	Sheffield United	H	1–1	11,239	Mortimer
20 February 1996	Huddersfield Town	A	2–2	10,951	Robson (pen), Bowyer
24 February 1996	Oldham Athletic	A	1–1	6,570	Grant
2 March 1996	Portsmouth	A	1–2	9,323	Butters (own goal)
5 March 1996	Southend United	H	0–3	11,849	
9 March 1996	Millwall	H	2–0	12,172	Bowyer, Leaburn
16 March 1996	Southend United	A	1–1	7,382	Mortimer (pen)
23 March 1996	Stoke City	H	2–1	12,770	Mortimer (pen), D Whyte
30 March 1996	Norwich City	A	1–0	13,434	Allen
2 April 1996	Leicester City	H	0–1	11,284	
5 April 1996	Luton Town	H	1–1	14,643	Allen (pen)
8 April 1996	Sunderland	A	0–0	20,914	
14 April 1996	Derby County	H	0–0	11,366	
17 April 1996	Stoke City	A	0–1	12,965	
20 April 1996	Reading	A	0–0	9,778	
27 April 1996	Port Vale	A	3–1	8,428	Balmer, Allen, Newton
30 April 1996	Tranmere Rovers	H	0–0	11,053	
5 May 1996	Wolverhampton Wanderers	H	1–1	14,023	Leaburn

=== First Division play-offs ===
Round	Date	Opponent	Venue	Result	Attendance	Goalscorers
SF 1st Leg	12 May 1996	Crystal Palace	H	1–2	14,618	Newton
SF 2nd Leg	15 May 1996	Crystal Palace	A	0–1 (lost 1–3 on agg)	22,880	

=== FA Cup ===
Round	Date	Opponent	Venue	Result	Attendance	Goalscorers
R3	6 January 1996	Sheffield Wednesday	H	2–0	13,815	Grant, Mortimer (pen)
R4	7 February 1996	Brentford	H	3–2	15,000	Robinson, Bowyer, D Whyte
R5	28 February 1996	Liverpool	A	1–2	36,818	Grant

=== League Cup ===
Round	Date	Opponent	Venue	Result	Attendance	Goalscorers
R1 1st Leg	15 August 1995	Barnet	A	0–0	1,893	
R1 2nd Leg	22 August 1995	Barnet	H	2–0 (won 2–0 on agg)	4,418	Bowyer (2)
R2 1st Leg	19 September 1995	Wimbledon	A	5–4	3,717	Garland, Grant, Bowyer (3)
R2 2nd Leg	3 October 1995	Wimbledon	H	3–3 (won 8–7 on agg)	9,823	Leaburn, Newton, Robinson
R3	25 October 1995	Wolverhampton Wanderers	A	0–0	22,481	
R3R	8 November 1995	Wolverhampton Wanderers	H	1–2	10,909	Robinson

== Players ==
=== First-team squad ===
Squad at end of season

Note: Flags indicate national team as defined under FIFA eligibility rules; some limited exceptions apply. Players may hold more than one non-FIFA nationality.

No.	Pos.	Nation	Player
—	GK	USA	Mike Ammann
—	GK	AUS	Andy Petterson
—	GK	ENG	Mike Salmon
—	DF	SCO	Stuart Balmer
—	DF	ENG	Steve Brown
—	DF	ENG	Dean Chandler
—	DF	ENG	Phil Chapple
—	DF	ENG	John Humphrey
—	DF	ENG	Matt Jackson (on loan from Everton)
—	DF	ENG	Richard Rufus
—	DF	ENG	Jamie Stuart
—	DF	ENG	Paul Sturgess
—	DF	ENG	Chris Whyte
—	MF	ENG	Lee Bowyer
—	MF	ENG	Peter Garland

No.	Pos.	Nation	Player
—	MF	ENG	Keith Jones
—	MF	ENG	Paul Linger
—	MF	ENG	Paul Mortimer
—	MF	ENG	Shaun Newton
—	MF	ENG	Kevin Nicholls
—	MF	WAL	John Robinson (Note: Robinson was born in Bulawayo, Rhodesia (now Zimbabwe), but also qualified to represent Wales internationally and represented them at U-21 level before making his international debut for Wales in 1995.)
—	MF	ENG	Mark Robson
—	MF	SCO	Colin Walsh
—	FW	ENG	Bradley Allen
—	FW	GHA	Kim Grant
—	FW	ENG	Carl Leaburn
—	FW	ENG	Garry Nelson
—	FW	ENG	David Whyte
—	FW	ENG	Paul Williams
