= 1997–98 Charlton Athletic F.C. season =

Charlton Athletic
1997–98 season
- Chairman: Richard Murray
- Manager: Alan Curbishley
- Stadium: The Valley
- First Division: 4th (promoted)
- FA Cup: Fourth round
- League Cup: First round
- Top goalscorer: League: Mendonca (23); All: Mendonca (28)
- Average home league attendance: 13,275
Home colours	Away colours	Third colours

During the 1997–98 English football season, Charlton Athletic F.C. competed in the Football League First Division. The club also competed in the FA Cup, and the League Cup.

== Season summary ==
The 1997–98 season was Charlton's best campaign for years. They reached the Division One play-off final and battled against Sunderland in a thrilling game which ended with a 4–4 draw after extra time. Charlton won 7–6 on penalties, with the match described as "arguably the most dramatic game of football in Wembley's history". With five minutes of normal time remaining, Charlton were losing 3–2 before Richard Rufus scored his first ever senior goal from a corner, forcing the game into extra-time. After the resulting 4–4 draw, the Addicks went on to win the game 7–6 on penalties, thus gaining promotion into the Premier League.

== Kit ==
Charlton's kit was manufactured by Quaser and sponsored by Viglen.

== Final league table ==
Pos	Team	Pld	W	D	L	GF	GA	GD	Pts	Qualification or relegation
2	Middlesbrough (P)	46	27	10	9	77	41	+36	91	Promotion to the Premier League
3	Sunderland	46	26	12	8	86	50	+36	90	Qualification for the First Division play-offs
4	Charlton Athletic (O, P)	46	26	10	10	80	49	+31	88	Qualification for the First Division play-offs
5	Ipswich Town	46	23	14	9	77	43	+34	83	Qualification for the First Division play-offs
6	Sheffield United	46	19	17	10	69	54	+15	74	Qualification for the First Division play-offs

Source: Statto.com
Rules for classification: 1) Points; 2) Goals scored; 3) Goal difference
(O) Play-off winners; (P) Promoted

== Results ==
Charlton Athletic's score comes first

=== Legend ===
Win	Draw	Loss

=== Football League First Division ===
Date	Opponent	Venue	Result	Attendance	Scorers
9 August 1997	Middlesbrough	A	1–2	29,414	S Jones
16 August 1997	Oxford United	H	3–2	10,230	S Jones, Mendonca, Lisbie
23 August 1997	Bury	A	0–0	4,657	
30 August 1997	Manchester City	H	2–1	14,009	van Blerk (own goal), K Jones
13 September 1997	Wolverhampton Wanderers	A	1–3	22,683	Chapple
17 September 1997	Norwich City	A	4–0	10,157	Mendonca (3), Chapple
21 September 1997	Bradford City	H	4–1	11,583	Mendonca (2), Mortimer, Brown
27 September 1997	Stockport County	H	1–3	12,083	Mortimer
4 October 1997	Queens Park Rangers	A	4–2	14,825	Robinson (2), S Jones, Chapple
14 October 1997	Huddersfield Town	A	3–0	9,596	Mendonca, Brown, Robinson
19 October 1997	Stoke City	H	1–1	12,345	Kinsella
22 October 1997	Birmingham City	H	1–1	10,072	Mendonca
25 October 1997	Tranmere Rovers	A	2–2	5,911	Kinsella, Leaburn
1 November 1997	Ipswich Town	H	3–0	12,627	Mendonca, Chapple, Leaburn
4 November 1997	Sunderland	A	0–0	25,455	
8 November 1997	West Bromwich Albion	A	0–1	16,124	
15 November 1997	Crewe Alexandra	H	3–2	14,091	K Jones, Allen, Holmes
22 November 1997	Nottingham Forest	A	2–5	18,532	Allen, Woan (own goal)
28 November 1997	Swindon Town	H	3–0	13,769	K Jones, Mendonca (2, 1 pen)
6 December 1997	Reading	A	0–2	8,076	
9 December 1997	Sheffield United	H	2–1	9,868	Mendonca (2, 1 pen)
13 December 1997	Port Vale	H	1–0	11,077	Newton
20 December 1997	Portsmouth	A	2–0	8,581	Robinson, Leaburn
26 December 1997	Norwich City	H	2–1	14,472	Kinsella, Robinson
28 December 1997	Sheffield United	A	1–4	18,677	Bright
10 January 1998	Middlesbrough	H	3–0	15,742	Newton (2), Bright
17 January 1998	Oxford United	A	2–1	7,234	Mendonca, Robinson
28 January 1998	Manchester City	A	2–2	24,058	S Jones (2)
31 January 1998	Bury	H	0–0	15,312	
7 February 1998	Bradford City	A	0–1	14,851	
17 February 1998	Queens Park Rangers	H	1–1	15,555	Robinson
21 February 1998	Stockport County	A	0–3	7,705	
25 February 1998	Stoke City	A	2–1	10,027	Robinson, Barness
28 February 1998	Huddersfield Town	H	1–0	12,908	Bright
3 March 1998	West Bromwich Albion	H	5–0	10,893	Bright, Newton, Mendonca (2, 1 pen), Kinsella
7 March 1998	Ipswich Town	A	1–3	19,831	Mendonca
15 March 1998	Sunderland	H	1–1	15,355	Bright
21 March 1998	Crewe Alexandra	A	3–0	5,252	Mills, Newton, Kinsella
28 March 1998	Nottingham Forest	H	4–2	15,815	Bright, Mortimer, Mendonca (pen), Kinsella
4 April 1998	Swindon Town	A	1–0	7,845	S Jones
7 April 1998	Wolverhampton Wanderers	H	1–0	13,743	Mendonca
10 April 1998	Reading	H	3–0	14,220	Mendonca, Mortimer, Bright
13 April 1998	Port Vale	A	1–0	9,973	Mendonca (pen)
18 April 1998	Portsmouth	H	1–0	14,082	S Jones
25 April 1998	Tranmere Rovers	H	2–0	15,393	Mendonca (2 pens)
3 May 1998	Birmingham City	A	0–0	25,877	

=== First Division play-offs ===
Round	Date	Opponent	Venue	Result	Attendance	Goalscorers
SF 1st Leg	10 May 1998	Ipswich Town	A	1–0	21,681	Clapham (own goal)
SF 2nd Leg	13 May 1998	Ipswich Town	H	1–0 (won 2–0 on agg)	15,585	Newton
F	25 May 1998	Sunderland	N	4–4 (won 7–6 on pens)	77,739	Mendonca (3), Rufus

=== FA Cup ===
Round	Date	Opponent	Venue	Result	Attendance	Goalscorers
R3	3 January 1998	Nottingham Forest	H	4–1	13,827	Robinson, Brown, Leaburn, Mendonca
R4	24 January 1998	Wolverhampton Wanderers	H	1–1	15,540	K Jones
R4R	3 February 1998	Wolverhampton Wanderers	A	0–3	20,429	

=== League Cup ===
Round	Date	Opponent	Venue	Result	Attendance	Goalscorers
R1 First Leg	13 August 1997	Ipswich Town	H	0–1	6,598	
R1 Second Leg	26 August 1997	Ipswich Town	A	1–3 (lost 1–4 on agg)	10,989	Mendonca

== First-team squad ==
Squad at end of season

Note: Flags indicate national team as defined under FIFA eligibility rules; some limited exceptions apply. Players may hold more than one non-FIFA nationality.

No.	Pos.	Nation	Player
—	GK	AUS	Andy Petterson
—	GK	YUG	Saša Ilić (Note: Ilić was born in Melbourne, Australia, but also qualified to represent FR Yugoslavia internationally and would make his international debut for FR Yugoslavia in December 1998.)
—	GK	ENG	Mike Salmon
—	DF	ENG	Richard Rufus
—	DF	WAL	Mark Bowen
—	DF	ENG	Phil Chapple
—	DF	ENG	Steve Brown
—	DF	ENG	Anthony Barness
—	DF	SCO	Stuart Balmer
—	DF	ENG	Danny Mills
—	DF	ENG	Eddie Youds
—	DF	ENG	Paul Konchesky
—	DF	ENG	Jamie Stuart
—	DF	ENG	David Kerslake (on loan from Tottenham Hotspur)
—	DF	ENG	Jason Tindall
—	DF	ENG	Anthony Allman

No.	Pos.	Nation	Player
—	MF	IRL	Mark Kinsella
—	MF	ENG	Keith Jones
—	MF	WAL	John Robinson (Note: Robinson was born in Bulawayo, Rhodesia (now Zimbabwe), but also qualified to represent Wales internationally and represented them at U-21 level before making his international debut for Wales in 1995.)
—	MF	ENG	Shaun Newton
—	MF	ENG	Matty Holmes
—	MF	ENG	Paul Mortimer
—	MF	ENG	Kevin Nicholls
—	MF	ENG	Paul Emblen
—	MF	ENG	Scott Parker
—	FW	ENG	Clive Mendonca
—	FW	ENG	Steve Jones
—	FW	ENG	Mark Bright
—	FW	ENG	Carl Leaburn
—	FW	ENG	Bradley Allen
—	FW	ENG	Neil Heaney (on loan from Manchester City)
—	FW	ENG	Kevin Lisbie (Note: Lisbie was born in Hackney, England, but also qualified to represent Jamaica internationally and would make his international debut for Jamaica in 2002.)
