= 2002–03 Charlton Athletic F.C. season =

Charlton Athletic
2002–03 season
- Chairman: Richard Murray
- Manager: Alan Curbishley
- Stadium: The Valley
- FA Premier League: 12th
- FA Cup: Fourth round
- League Cup: Second round
- Top goalscorer: League: Jason Euell (10); All: Jason Euell (11)
- Highest home attendance: 26,728 (vs. Newcastle United, 15 March)
- Lowest home attendance: 25,640 vs Chelsea, (17 August)
- Average home league attendance: 26,255
Home colours	Away colours

During the 2002–03 English football season, Charlton Athletic competed in the FA Premier League. The club also competed in the FA Cup, and the League Cup.

== Season summary ==
Another solid season resulted in a mid-table finish for Charlton. However, the end of the season proved to be the undoing of Alan Curbishley's men once more, and after the start of March, they only managed one more victory, dropping to 12th place in the final table. Considering the relatively small budget Curbishley was operating on; even this was quite an achievement.

Midfielder Scott Parker was nominated for the PFA Young Player of the Year award, but lost to Jermaine Jenas of Newcastle United.

This season saw the final competitive appearance of Richard Rufus coming against Liverpool on 21 April 2003. Rufus had spent his entire career with the one club. While playing for Charlton he was capped six times by England U21. Over 11 years the centre back had made 288 appearances, scoring 12 goals.

== Kit ==
Charlton's kit was manufactured by Le Coq Sportif and sponsored by sports apparel retailer all:sports.

== Final league table ==
Pos	Team	Pld	W	D	L	GF	GA	GD	Pts
10	Tottenham Hotspur	38	14	8	16	51	62	−11	50
11	Middlesbrough	38	13	10	15	48	44	+4	49
12	Charlton Athletic	38	14	7	17	45	56	−11	49
13	Birmingham City	38	13	9	16	41	49	−8	48
14	Fulham	38	13	9	16	41	50	−9	48

Source: Premier League
Rules for classification: 1) points; 2) goal difference; 3) number of goals scored.

=== Results per matchday ===
Matchday	1	2	3	4	5	6	7	8	9	10	11	12	13	14	15	16	17	18	19	20	21	22	23	24	25	26	27	28	29	30	31	32	33	34	35	36	37	38
Ground	H	A	H	A	A	H	A	H	A	H	A	H	A	A	H	A	H	H	A	A	H	A	H	H	A	A	H	H	A	H	A	H	A	H	A	H	A	H
Result	L	W	L	W	L	L	D	L	L	W	L	D	L	W	W	W	W	D	D	D	W	L	D	W	W	W	W	W	L	L	D	L	L	L	L	W	L	L
Position	14	11	12	8	11	17	16	20	20	16	17	16	17	16	15	12	11	11	11	12	12	14	13	11	10	8	8	6	7	8	7	9	10	11	12	9	12	12

Source: WorldFootball.com
A = Away; H = Home; W = Win; D = Draw; L = Loss

== Results ==
17 August 2002 1	Charlton Athletic	2–3	Chelsea	London
	Konchesky 7'; Rufus 33'; Konchesky (red card) 24'		Zola 43'; Cole 84'; Lampard 89'	Stadium: The Valley; Attendance: 25,640

24 August 2002 2	Bolton Wanderers	1–2	Charlton Athletic	Bolton
	Djorkaeff 2'		Bart-Williams 26' (pen.); Euell 71'	Stadium: Reebok Stadium; Attendance: 21,753

27 August 2002 3	Charlton Athletic	0–1	Tottenham Hotspur	London
			Davies 9'	Stadium: The Valley; Attendance: 26,461

31 August 2002 4	West Ham United	0–2	Charlton Athletic	London
			Jensen 4'; Fortune 44'	Stadium: Boleyn Ground; Attendance: 32,424

11 September 2002 5	Aston Villa	2–0	Charlton Athletic	Birmingham
	de la Cruz 70'; Moore 83'			Stadium: Villa Park; Attendance: 26,483

14 September 2002 6	Charlton Athletic	0–3	Arsenal	London
			Henry 44'; Wiltord 67'; Edu 88'	Stadium: The Valley; Attendance: 26,080

21 September 2002 7	Southampton	0–0	Charlton Athletic	Southampton
				Stadium: St Mary's Stadium; Attendance: 25,714

28 September 2002 8	Charlton Athletic	1–3	Manchester United	London
	Jensen 43'		Scholes 53'; Giggs 82' van Nistelrooy 90'	Stadium: The Valley; Attendance: 26,630

6 October 2002 9	Fulham	1–0	Charlton Athletic	London
	Sava 36'			Stadium: Loftus Road; Attendance: 14,775

20 October 2002 10	Charlton Athletic	1–0	Middlesbrough	London
	Euell 5'			Stadium: The Valley; Attendance: 26,271

26 October 2002 11	Newcastle United	2–1	Charlton Athletic	Newcastle upon Tyne
	Griffin 37'; Robert 59'		Bartlett 30'	Stadium: St James' Park; Attendance: 51,670

3 November 2002 12	Charlton Athletic	1–1	Sunderland	London
	Rowett 77'		Flo 15'	Stadium: The Valley; Attendance: 26,284

9 November 2002 13	Everton	1–0	Charlton Athletic	Liverpool
	Radzinski 31'			Stadium: Goodison Park; Attendance: 37,621

16 November 2002 14	Manchester City	0–1	Charlton Athletic	Manchester
			Bartlett 79'	Stadium: Maine Road; Attendance: 33,455

24 November 2002 15	Charlton Athletic	3–1	Blackburn Rovers	London
	Konchesky 59'; Rufus 74'; Euell 90'		Thompson 60'	Stadium: The Valley; Attendance: 26,152

1 December 2002 16	Leeds United	1–2	Charlton Athletic	Leeds
	Kewell 42'		Lisbie 80'; Parker 90'	Stadium: Elland Road; Attendance: 35,537

7 December 2002 17	Charlton Athletic	2–0	Liverpool	London
	Euell 36'; Konchesky 78'			Stadium: The Valley; Attendance: 26,694

14 December 2002 18	Charlton Athletic	2–2	Manchester City	London
	Euell 50' (pen.); Jensen 62'		Foé 72', 87'	Stadium: The Valley; Attendance: 26,484

21 December 2002 19	Birmingham City	1–1	Charlton Athletic	Birmingham
	Horsfield (red card) 53'; Devlin 67' (pen.)		Jensen 37'	Stadium: St Andrews; Attendance: 28,837

26 December 2002 20	Tottenham Hotspur	2–2	Charlton Athletic	London
	Keane 68'; Iversen 87'; Ziege (red card) 88'		Euell 14', 48'	Stadium: White Hart Lane; Attendance: 36,043

28 December 2002 21	Charlton Athletic	1–0	West Bromwich Albion	London
	Lisbie 6'			Stadium: The Valley; Attendance: 26,196

11 January 2003 22	Chelsea	4–1	Charlton Athletic	London
	Hasselbaink 3' (pen.); Gallas 11'; Guðjohnsen 34'; Le Saux 54'		Euell 42' (pen.)	Stadium: Stamford Bridge; Attendance: 37,284

18 January 2003 23	Charlton Athletic	1–1	Bolton Wanderers	London
	Fish 47'		Djorkaeff 85'	Stadium: The Valley; Attendance: 26,057

22 January 2003 24	Charlton Athletic	4–2	West Ham United	London
	Jensen 42'; Parker 45', 52'; Kishishev 90'		Rufus 19' (o.g.); Fish 62' (o.g.)	Stadium: The Valley; Attendance: 26,340

28 January 2003 25	West Bromwich Albion	0–1	Charlton Athletic	West Bromwich
			Bartlett 60'	Stadium: The Hawthorns; Attendance: 26,113

1 February 2003 26	Sunderland	1–3	Charlton Athletic	Sunderland
	Phillips 80' (pen.)		Wright 24' (o.g.); Proctor 24', 31' (o.g.)	Stadium: Stadium of Light; Attendance: 36,042

8 February 2003 27	Charlton Athletic	2–1	Everton	London
	Kishishev 18'; Lisbie 83'		McBride 68'	Stadium: The Valley; Attendance: 26,623

22 February 2003 28	Charlton Athletic	3–0	Aston Villa	London
	Euell 51'; Johansson 87', 90'			Stadium: The Valley; Attendance: 26,257

2 March 2003 29	Arsenal	2–0	Charlton Athletic	London
	Jeffers 26'; Pires 45'			Stadium: Highbury; Attendance: 38,015

15 March 2003 30	Charlton Athletic	0–2	Newcastle United	London
			Shearer 32' (pen.); Solano 48'	Stadium: The Valley; Attendance: 26,728

22 March 2003 31	Middlesbrough	1–1	Charlton Athletic	Middlesbrough
	Christie 57'		Johansson 26'	Stadium: Riverside Stadium; Attendance: 29,080

5 April 2003 32	Charlton Athletic	1–6	Leeds United	London
	Euell 45' (pen.)		Kewell 12', 76'; Harte 34' (pen.); Viduka 42', 53', 56' (pen.)	Stadium: The Valley; Attendance: 26,274

12 April 2003 33	Blackburn Rovers	1–0	Charlton Athletic	Blackburn
	Duff 34'			Stadium: Ewood Park; Attendance: 27,506

19 April 2003 34	Charlton Athletic	0–2	Birmingham City	London
			Dugarry 20'; Savage 55' (pen.)	Stadium: The Valley; Attendance: 25,732

21 April 2003 35	Liverpool	2–1	Charlton Athletic	Liverpool
	Hyypiä 86'; Gerrard 90'		Bartlett 47'	Stadium: Anfield; Attendance: 42,010

26 April 2003 36	Charlton Athletic	2–1	Southampton	London
	Parker 32'; Lisbie 50'		Beattie 90'	Stadium: The Valley; Attendance: 25,894

3 May 2003 37	Manchester United	4–1	Charlton Athletic	Manchester
	Beckham 11' van Nistelrooy 31', 37', 53'		Jensen 13'	Stadium: Old Trafford; Attendance: 67,721

11 May 2003 38	Charlton Athletic	0–1	Fulham	London
	Kiely (red card) 30'		Saha 33' (pen.)	Stadium: The Valley; Attendance: 26,108

=== FA Cup ===
4 January 2003 Round 3	Charlton Athletic	3–1	Exeter City	London
	Johansson 25', 61'; Euell 72' (pen.)		Gaia 49'	Stadium: The Valley; Attendance: 18,107

26 January 2003 Round 4	Fulham	3–0	Charlton Athletic	London
	Malbranque 59', 66' (pen.), 87' (pen.)			Stadium: Loftus Road; Attendance: 12,203

=== League Cup ===
1 October 2003 Round 2	Charlton Athletic	0–0 (a.e.t.) (5–6 p)	Oxford United	London
				Stadium: The Valley; Attendance: 9,494

== Players ==
=== First-team squad ===
Squad at end of season

Note: Flags indicate national team as defined under FIFA eligibility rules; some limited exceptions apply. Players may hold more than one non-FIFA nationality.

No.	Pos.	Nation	Player
1	GK	IRL	Dean Kiely (Note: Kiely was born in Salford, England, and represented them at U-15, U-16, and U-18 level, but also qualified to represent the Republic of Ireland internationally and made his international debut for the Republic of Ireland in November 1999.)
2	DF	BUL	Radostin Kishishev
3	DF	ENG	Chris Powell
4	MF	ENG	Graham Stuart (captain)
5	DF	ENG	Richard Rufus
6	DF	RSA	Mark Fish
7	MF	ENG	Scott Parker
8	MF	SWE	Jesper Blomqvist
9	FW	ENG	Jason Euell (Note: Euell was born in Lambeth, England, and represented them at U-21 level, but also qualified to represent Jamaica internationally through his father and would make his international debut for Jamaica in November 2004.)
10	MF	DEN	Claus Jensen
11	MF	WAL	John Robinson (Note: Robinson was born in Bulawayo, Rhodesia (now Zimbabwe), but also qualified to represent Wales internationally and represented them at U-21 level before making his international debut for Wales in 1995.)
15	DF	ENG	Gary Rowett

No.	Pos.	Nation	Player
16	DF	ENG	Chris Bart-Williams (Note: Bart-Williams was born in Freetown, Sierra Leone, but was raised in England and represented them at U-21 and B level.)
17	FW	RSA	Shaun Bartlett
18	DF	ENG	Paul Konchesky
19	DF	ENG	Luke Young
20	FW	SWE	Mathias Svensson
21	FW	FIN	Jonatan Johansson
22	GK	ENG	Ben Roberts
23	FW	JAM	Kevin Lisbie (Note: Lisbie was born in Hackney, England, but also qualified to represent Jamaica internationally and made his international debut for Jamaica in 2002.)
24	DF	ENG	Jonathan Fortune
27	MF	JAM	Jamal Campbell-Ryce (Note: Campbell-Ryce was born in Lambeth, England, but also qualified to represent Jamaica internationally and would make his international debut for Jamaica in 2003.)
30	DF	MAR	Tahar El Khalej
31	DF	ENG	Osei Sankofa

=== Left club during season ===
Note: Flags indicate national team as defined under FIFA eligibility rules; some limited exceptions apply. Players may hold more than one non-FIFA nationality.

No.	Pos.	Nation	Player
8	MF	IRL	Mark Kinsella (to Aston Villa)
12	DF	ENG	Steve Brown (to Reading)

No.	Pos.	Nation	Player
14	FW	SWE	Martin Pringle (retired)
25	MF	ENG	Robbie Mustoe (released)

=== Reserve squad ===
Note: Flags indicate national team as defined under FIFA eligibility rules; some limited exceptions apply. Players may hold more than one non-FIFA nationality.

No.	Pos.	Nation	Player
13	GK	ENG	Paul Rachubka (Note: Rachubka was born in San Luis Obispo, California, United States, but was raised in England from the age of 7, and represented them at U-16, U-18, and U-20 level.)
26	DF	ENG	Michael Turner
28	MF	IRL	Adrian Deane (Note: Deane was born in London, England, but also qualified to represent the Republic of Ireland internationally and appeared for the youth teams.)

No.	Pos.	Nation	Player
29	FW	ENG	Mark DeBolla
—	MF	IRL	Neil McCafferty (Note: McCafferty was born in Derry, Northern Ireland, but also qualified to represent the Republic of Ireland internationally and appeared for the U16 and U19 teams.)

== Statistics ==
=== Appearances and goals ===
No.	Pos	Nat	Player	Total		Premier League		FA Cup		League Cup	
No.	Pos	Nat	Player	Apps	Goals	Apps	Goals	Apps	Goals	Apps	Goals
Goalkeepers
1	GK	(Republic of Ireland) IRL	Dean Kiely	41	0	38	0	2	0	1	0
22	GK	(England) ENG	Ben Roberts	1	0	0+1	0	0	0	0	0
Defenders
3	DF	(England) ENG	Chris Powell	37	0	35+2	0	0	0	0	0
5	DF	(England) ENG	Richard Rufus	33	2	29+1	2	2	0	1	0
6	DF	(South Africa) RSA	Mark Fish	25	1	23	1	1	0	1	0
15	DF	(England) ENG	Gary Rowett	12	1	12	1	0	0	0	0
19	DF	(England) ENG	Luke Young	34	0	29+3	0	2	0	0	0
24	DF	(England) ENG	Jonathan Fortune	29	1	22+4	1	1+1	0	1	0
30	DF	(Morocco) MAR	Tahar El Khalej	3	0	2+1	0	0	0	0	0
31	DF	(England) ENG	Osei Sankofa	1	0	0+1	0	0	0	0	0
Midfielders
2	MF	(Bulgaria) BUL	Radostin Kishishev	37	2	27+7	2	2	0	1	0
4	MF	(England) ENG	Graham Stuart	4	0	3+1	0	0	0	0	0
7	MF	(England) ENG	Scott Parker	29	4	28	4	1	0	0	0
8	MF	(Sweden) SWE	Jesper Blomqvist	4	0	0+3	0	1	0	0	0
9	MF	(England) ENG	Jason Euell	39	11	35+1	10	2	1	1	0
10	MF	(Denmark) DEN	Claus Jensen	37	6	32+3	6	1	0	1	0
11	MF	(Wales) WAL	John Robinson	14	0	10+3	0	0	0	0+1	0
16	MF	(England) ENG	Chris Bart-Williams	15	1	7+6	1	1+1	0	0	0
18	MF	(England) ENG	Paul Konchesky	33	3	17+13	3	2	0	1	0
27	MF	(Jamaica) JAM	Jamal Campbell-Ryce	1	0	0+1	0	0	0	0	0
Forwards
17	FW	(South Africa) RSA	Shaun Bartlett	34	4	25+6	4	2	0	1	0
20	FW	(Sweden) SWE	Mathias Svensson	18	0	4+11	0	0+2	0	0+1	0
21	FW	(Finland) FIN	Jonatan Johansson	34	5	10+21	3	2	2	1	0
23	FW	(Jamaica) JAM	Kevin Lisbie	33	4	24+8	4	0+1	0	0	0
Players transferred out during the season
12	DF	(England) ENG	Steve Brown	4	0	0+3	0	0	0	0+1	0
25	MF	(England) ENG	Robbie Mustoe	7	0	6	0	0	0	1	0

Last updated: 31 June 2003
