= 1998 Football League First Division play-off final =

Association football match in London

- The match was played at Wembley Stadium.
| Charlton Athletic | Sunderland |
| 4 | 4 |
- Charlton won 7–6 on penalties
- Date: 25 May 1998
- Venue: Wembley Stadium, London
- Referee: Eddie Wolstenholme
- Attendance: 77,739

The 1998 Football League First Division play-off final was an association football match played on 25 May 1998 at Wembley Stadium, London, between Charlton Athletic and Sunderland. The match was to determine the third and final team to gain promotion from the Football League First Division, the second tier of English football, to the Premier League for the 1998–99 season. The top two teams of the 1997–98 Football League First Division season gained automatic promotion, and the teams placed from third to sixth place in the table took part in play-off semi-finals; Sunderland had ended the season in third position and Charlton had finished fourth. The clubs won their semi-finals and competed for the final promotion place. Winning the game was estimated to be worth up to twenty million pounds to the successful team.

The match was played in front of almost 78,000 spectators and was refereed by Eddie Wolstenholme. Clive Mendonca opened the scoring for Charlton midway through the first half, before Niall Quinn equalised early in the second. Kevin Phillips then scored his 35th goal of the season to put Sunderland ahead but Mendonca doubled his own tally with fewer than twenty minutes remaining. Quinn restored Sunderland's lead two minutes later, before a Richard Rufus header for Charlton five minutes from the end of regular time made the score 3–3, and sent the game into extra time. Nicky Summerbee then gave Sunderland the lead for the third time before Mendonca completed his hat-trick, the first player to do so in a play-off final. Extra time ended 4–4, so the game was determined by a penalty shootout. Both teams scored their first five spot-kicks before the shootout moved to 'sudden death'. Michael Gray stepped forward to take Sunderland's seventh penalty, but his weak strike was saved by the Charlton goalkeeper Saša Ilić and Charlton won 7–6 on penalties.

Sunderland ended their following season as champions of the First Division, amassing a record 105 points, and were promoted to the 1999–2000 Premier League. Charlton's next season saw them finish in eighteenth position, five points from safety, and relegated back to the First Division. The 1998 play-off final is considered by players, managers, pundits and the media to be one of the most memorable and dramatic games played at Wembley.

== Route to the final ==
Football League First Division final table, leading positions
| Pos | Team | Pld | W | D | L | GF | GA | GD | Pts |
|---|---|---|---|---|---|---|---|---|---|
| 1 | Nottingham Forest | 46 | 28 | 10 | 8 | 82 | 42 | +40 | 94 |
| 2 | Middlesbrough | 46 | 27 | 10 | 9 | 77 | 41 | +36 | 91 |
| 3 | Sunderland | 46 | 26 | 12 | 8 | 86 | 50 | +36 | 90 |
| 4 | Charlton Athletic | 46 | 26 | 10 | 10 | 80 | 49 | +31 | 88 |
| 5 | Ipswich Town | 46 | 23 | 14 | 9 | 77 | 43 | +34 | 83 |
| 6 | Sheffield United | 46 | 19 | 17 | 10 | 69 | 54 | +15 | 74 |

Sunderland finished the regular 1997–98 season in third place in the Football League First Division, the second tier of the English football league system, one place ahead of Charlton Athletic. Both therefore missed out on the two automatic places for promotion to the Premier League and instead took part in that season's play-offs to determine the third promoted team. Sunderland finished one point behind Middlesbrough (who were promoted in second place) and four behind league winners Nottingham Forest. Charlton ended the season two points behind Sunderland.

Charlton faced Ipswich Town in their play-off semi-final and the first leg was played at Portman Road in Ipswich on 10 May 1998. An early own goal from Jamie Clapham decided the ill-disciplined match in which nine yellow cards were shown, including two to Charlton's Danny Mills who was dismissed in the 73rd minute. The match ended 1–0 and secured Charlton's eighth consecutive clean sheet. Arguments between the players continued after the final whistle culminating in an altercation in the players' lounge in which Ipswich defender Mauricio Taricco's nose was broken by Neil Heaney. The second leg was played three days later at Charlton's home ground, The Valley, and once again ended in a 1–0 victory to the London club. Although Ipswich dominated in periods of the second half, they only forced one save from Saša Ilić, the opposition goalkeeper. Charlton won the tie 2–0 on aggregate and qualified for the play-off final.

Sunderland's opponents for their play-off semi-final were Sheffield United, the first leg being played at Bramall Lane in Sheffield on 10 May 1998. Kevin Ball put the visiting team into an early lead, scoring after 17 minutes, but Marcelo equalised before Vassilios Borbokis scored the winner with 14 minutes to go, the match ending 2–1 to Sheffield United. The return leg was played at the Stadium of Light three days later, Sunderland taking the lead midway through the first half after Nicky Marker deflected a cross-shot from Allan Johnston past his own goalkeeper. Seven minutes before half time, Kevin Phillips doubled Sunderland's lead with his 34th goal of the season. With 17 minutes of the second half remaining, the Sunderland goalkeeper Lionel Pérez made two saves to deny Graham Stuart before keeping Paul Devlin's shot out with what the BBC described as "a truly world-class save". The match ended 2–0 to Sunderland who progressed to the final with a 3–2 aggregate victory.

| Charlton Athletic | | | Round | Sunderland |
|---|---|---|---|---|---|---|
| Opponent | Result | Legs | Semi-finals | Opponent | Result | Legs |
| Ipswich Town | 2–0 | 1–0 away; 1–0 home | | Sheffield United | 3–2 | 1–2 away; 2–0 home |

== Match ==
=== Background ===
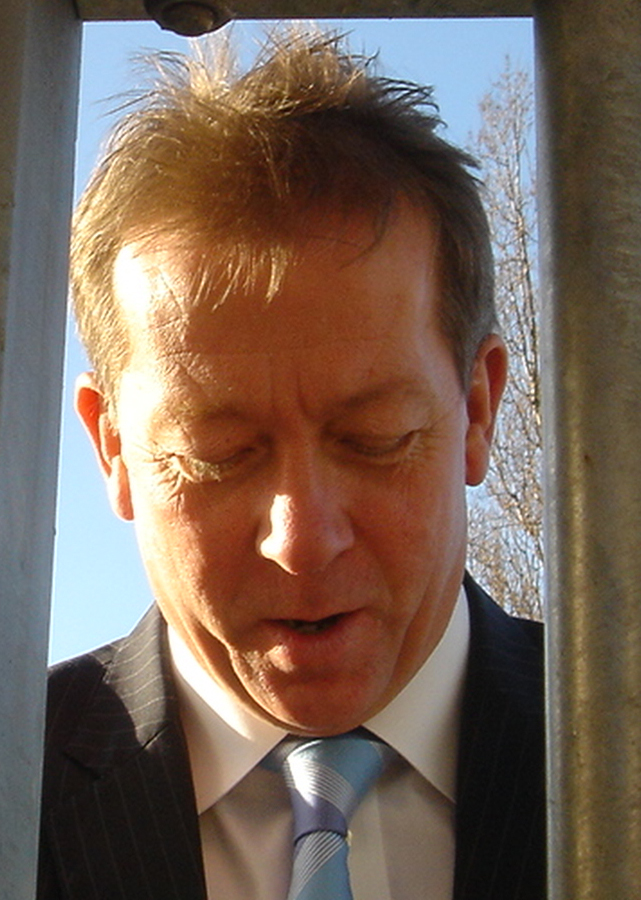
Alan Curbishley (pictured in 2007) had brought several players, including Clive Mendonca, to Charlton.

That season, the Charlton manager Alan Curbishley had invested around £1.7 million in his squad, signing Clive Mendonca from Grimsby Town for £700,000. Other signings included Mills, Matty Holmes and Eddie Youds, while Ilić was acquired on a free transfer from semi-professional team St. Leonards of the Southern Football League (known at that time as the Dr Martens League for sponsorship reasons); he went on to be selected over Charlton's 1996–97 player of the year Andy Petterson. Before the season commenced, Russell Kempson wrote in The Times that he considered Sunderland to be among the favourites for promotion back to the Premier League, along with Middlesbrough and Wolverhampton Wanderers. He added that "Alan Curbishley will continue to do a good job at The Valley, yet achieve nothing tangible". The Liverpool Echo noted that Sunderland had suffered relegation as a result of a failure to score towards the end of the previous season, and Peter Reid's investment of more than £4 million in the transfer market sought to address that issue.

Mendonca was the highest scorer for Charlton with 25 goals in 44 appearances across all competitions during the regular 1997–98 season, followed by the midfielder John Robinson with 9 goals in 42 matches. Sunderland had paid £350,000 for Phillips in July 1997 and he formed a prolific strike partnership with club-record signing Niall Quinn throughout the season: Phillips had scored 33 times in 44 appearances, and Quinn 15 times from 37 games. Phillips had also been named the League Player of the Year. Reid wrote in his 2017 autobiography that Phillips was "arguably the best signing [he] ever made".

This was Charlton's second appearance in the second tier play-off final, having beaten Leeds United after a replay in the two-legged 1987 Football League Second Division play-off final. Sunderland were also making their second appearance in a second-tier play-off final: despite losing 1–0 to Swindon Town in the 1990 Football League Second Division play-off final at the old Wembley Stadium, they were promoted as Swindon were later found guilty of financial misconduct. Charlton had played in the second tier of English football for the last eight seasons, having been relegated from the First Division in the 1989–90 season. Sunderland were aiming to return to the Premier League at the first time of asking, having been relegated in the previous season. During the regular season, both games between the sides had ended in a draw: the match at the Stadium of Light in November 1997 was goalless, while the return fixture the following March resulted in a 1–1 draw.

With Charlton's run of nine consecutive clean sheets and a series of 1–0 victories leading up to the final, their captain Mark Kinsella acknowledged the club's reputation for being "boring" but noted "at this stage of the season it's not about the performances, it's about results and we have been coming up trumps". Kinsella himself had opted to take part in the play-off final in preference to collecting his third cap for the Republic of Ireland in a friendly in Dublin against Mexico two days prior, suggesting the domestic match was "the biggest game in Charlton's history" and that as club captain, he "had to be there". Curbishley noted that his club were "firmly back on the map" and that "people ... are talking about what a good side we are". Before the final, the Charlton board of directors announced that a new West Stand would be complete before the start of the next season and that a new £1 million sponsorship deal with Mesh Computers had been agreed with the newly embellished shirts being worn for the match. The Sunderland manager Peter Reid was resolute: "This is a massive, massive game for Sunderland Football Club, and it's one which I am confident my lads can win – if they are at their best." Previewing the match, Liam Kirk writing in the Irish Independent predicted a close game and that both teams would "satisfy the neutral and both rely on strikers plucked astutely from obscurity". Irish bookmaker Paddy Power had Sunderland as favourites to win, while former England international Gary Stevens also thought the Wearside club had the advantage.

For Sunderland, Quinn had recovered from a recurring hamstring injury he aggravated in the second leg of the play-off semi-final against Sheffield United, while Phillips was also fit after suffering a thigh strain in the same match. Charlton's Robinson was selected on the bench having not played for eight weeks following a hairline fracture of his right leg. The referee for the match was Eddie Wolstenholme; he had officiated the second leg of the semi-final between Ipswich and Charlton. It was reported in the press that the match was worth £5–10 million, and later by Deloitte to be worth up to £20 million, to the winning team from television revenue. The match was broadcast live in the UK on Sky Sports. Charlton wore their traditional red and white kit while Sunderland were in an away strip of old gold and dark blue.

=== First half ===
The match kicked off around 3 p.m. in front of a Wembley crowd of 77,739, around 35,000 of which were Charlton supporters. Their team started the better, with a strong defence and a midfield which disrupted Sunderland's passing. The first chance fell to Sunderland in the 14th minute following an error from Ilić, and six minutes later Ball was unmarked but his header from a Nicky Summerbee corner went over Charlton's crossbar. In the 23rd minute Charlton took the lead. Mills' throw-in was flicked on to Mark Bright who passed to Mendonca. He dummied Jody Craddock and struck from 15 yards (14 m), beating Pérez in the goal. Sunderland had opportunities to score through Ball and Quinn, although Gray was required to prevent Bright from scoring after a cross from Heaney. Towards the end of the half, Lee Clark's shot went over the Charlton goal before Youds' tackle prevented Summerbee from shooting. The whistle was blown by Wolstenholme and the half ended, 1–0 to Charlton.

=== Second half ===
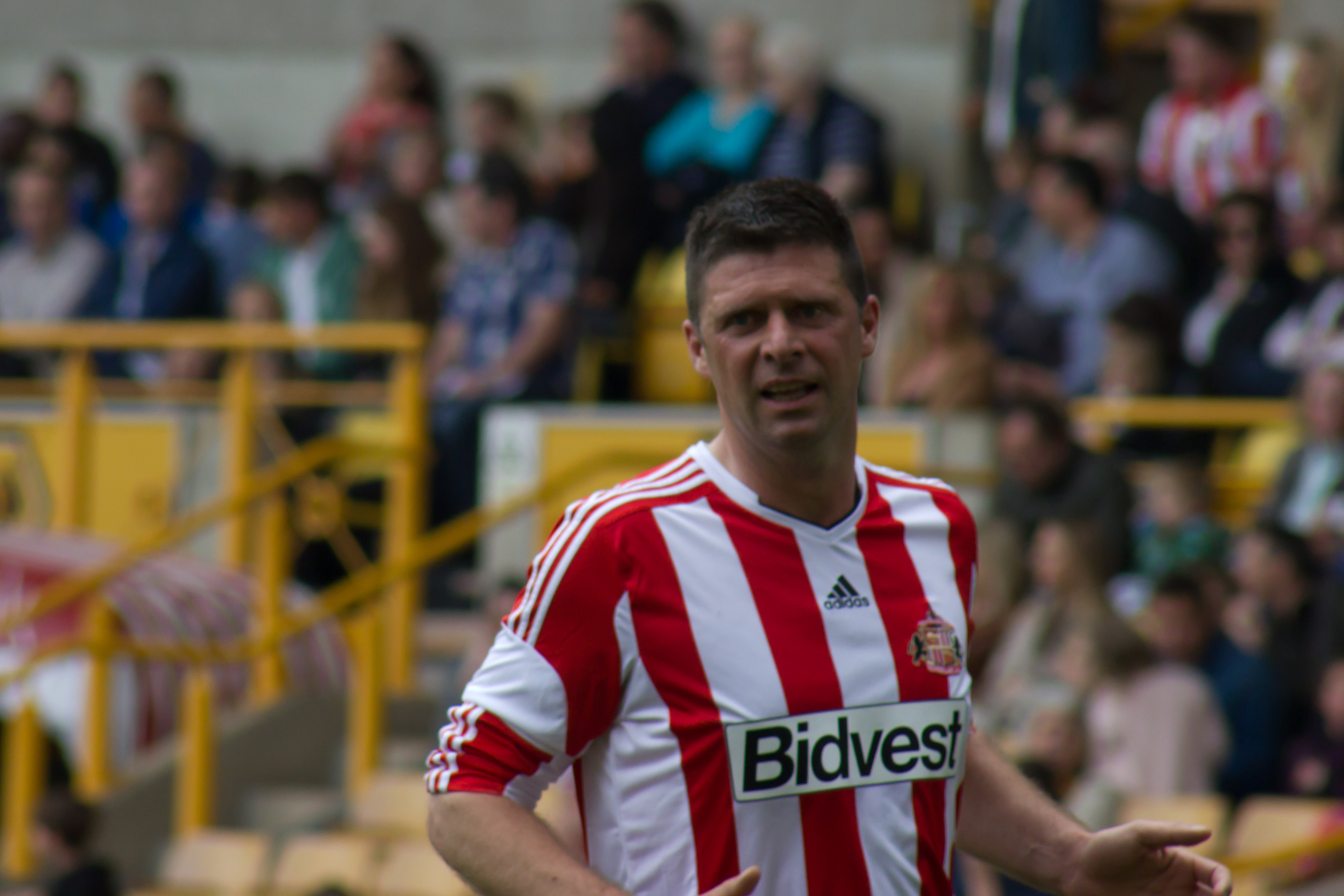
Niall Quinn (pictured in 2014) scored two second-half goals for Sunderland.

During the break, Sunderland made their first substitution of the game, Chris Makin coming on to replace Darren Holloway. In the 50th minute, the score was levelled by Quinn. He evaded Youds to head a Summerbee corner between the near post and Mark Bowen, making it 1–1. Kinsella then came close to scoring from a free kick and Quinn missed a good chance, shooting over the crossbar, before Phillips put Sunderland ahead in the 58th minute. Having been put through by Clark, he lobbed Ilić to make it 2–1. Charlton made their first change of the game minutes later, Heaney being replaced by Steve Jones. In the 71st minute, Richard Rufus passed to Mendonca, who took two touches and struck the ball into the Sunderland goal, levelling the match once again. Two minutes later, Quinn put Sunderland ahead: after controlling a deep cross from Clark using his chest, the Sunderland forward struck the ball past Ilić, making it 3–2. Phillips was then replaced by Danny Dichio who quickly missed a chance by electing to attempt a volley rather than a diving header from a Summerbee cross. Mendonca was then prevented from scoring twice by the Sunderland defence, before Rufus brought the game level once again. Pérez missed an attempted clearance on a Robinson corner, having been blocked by Bright, and Rufus was left unmarked to score his first Charlton goal in 165 appearances for the club, and make it 3–3 with five minutes remaining. No further goals were scored so the game went into extra time.

=== Extra time and penalties ===
Early into the first period of extra time, Bright was taken off and replaced by Steve Brown. On eight minutes, Sunderland went ahead with their fourth goal of the match. A cushioned ball from Quinn found Summerbee who struck a shot from the edge of the penalty area past Ilić. Quinn then missed a chance from 6 yards (5.5 m) to convert Johnston's cross to score Sunderland's fifth. Alex Rae then came on to replace Clark. Minutes later, Steve Jones played to ball behind Mendonca whose first touch controlled it and whose second touch was to volley past Pérez, scoring his 28th goal of the season. Rae and Craddock both missed chances to score the winner for Sunderland, and extra time ended with the score level on 4–4; the match would need to be determined via a penalty shootout, which was to be conducted at the Sunderland end of the stadium. Sunderland went into the shootout without two of their regular penalty-takers as both Phillips and Clark had been replaced through injury. Mendonca scored the first penalty, followed by Summerbee, Brown, Johnston, Keith Jones, Ball, Kinsella, Makin, Bowen and Rae, to make it 5–5 and take the shootout to sudden death. Robinson and Quinn then scored, to make it 6–6. Shaun Newton then stepped up to give the advantage to Charlton. Gray's weak shot was then saved by Ilić to his left and the match was over, Charlton winning 7–6 on penalties, and promotion to the Premier League.

=== Details ===
25 May 1998
15:00

| Charlton Athletic | 4–4 (a.e.t.) | Sunderland |
|---|---|---|
| Mendonca 23', 71', 103'; Rufus 85' | Report | Quinn 50', 73'; Phillips 58'; Summerbee 99' |
Penalties
| Mendonca (penalty scored); Brown (penalty scored); K. Jones (penalty scored); Kinsella (penalty scored); Bowen (penalty scored); Robinson (penalty scored); Newton (penalty scored) | 7–6 | (penalty scored) Summerbee; (penalty scored) Johnston; (penalty scored) Ball; (penalty scored) Makin; (penalty scored) Rae; (penalty scored) Quinn; (penalty missed) Gray |

Wembley Stadium, London
Attendance: 77,739
Referee: Eddie Wolstenholme

| Charlton Athletic | Sunderland |

Charlton Athletic:
| GK | 1 | Saša Ilić |
| RB | 2 | Danny Mills | (substituted off) 76' |
| CB | 5 | Richard Rufus (yellow card) |
| CB | 6 | Eddie Youds |
| LB | 3 | Mark Bowen |
| RM | 7 | Shaun Newton |
| CM | 4 | Keith Jones |
| CM | 8 | Mark Kinsella (c) (yellow card) |
| LM | 11 | Neil Heaney | (substituted off) 65' |
| CF | 9 | Mark Bright | (substituted off) 93' |
| CF | 10 | Clive Mendonca (yellow card) |
Substitutes:
| DF | 12 | Steve Brown | (substituted on) 93' |
| MF | 13 | John Robinson | (substituted on) 76' |
| FW | 14 | Steve Jones | (substituted on) 65' |
Manager:
Alan Curbishley

Sunderland:
| GK | 1 | Lionel Pérez |
| RB | 2 | Darren Holloway (yellow card) | (substituted off) 45' |
| CB | 5 | Jody Craddock |
| CB | 6 | Darren Williams (yellow card) |
| LB | 3 | Michael Gray |
| RM | 7 | Nicky Summerbee |
| CM | 4 | Lee Clark | (substituted off) 100' |
| CM | 8 | Kevin Ball (c) |
| LM | 11 | Allan Johnston |
| CF | 9 | Niall Quinn |
| CF | 10 | Kevin Phillips (yellow card) | (substituted off) 73' |
Substitutes:
| DF | 12 | Chris Makin | (substituted on) 45' |
| MF | 13 | Alex Rae | (substituted on) 100' |
| FW | 14 | Danny Dichio | (substituted on) 73' |
Manager:
Peter Reid

== Post-match ==
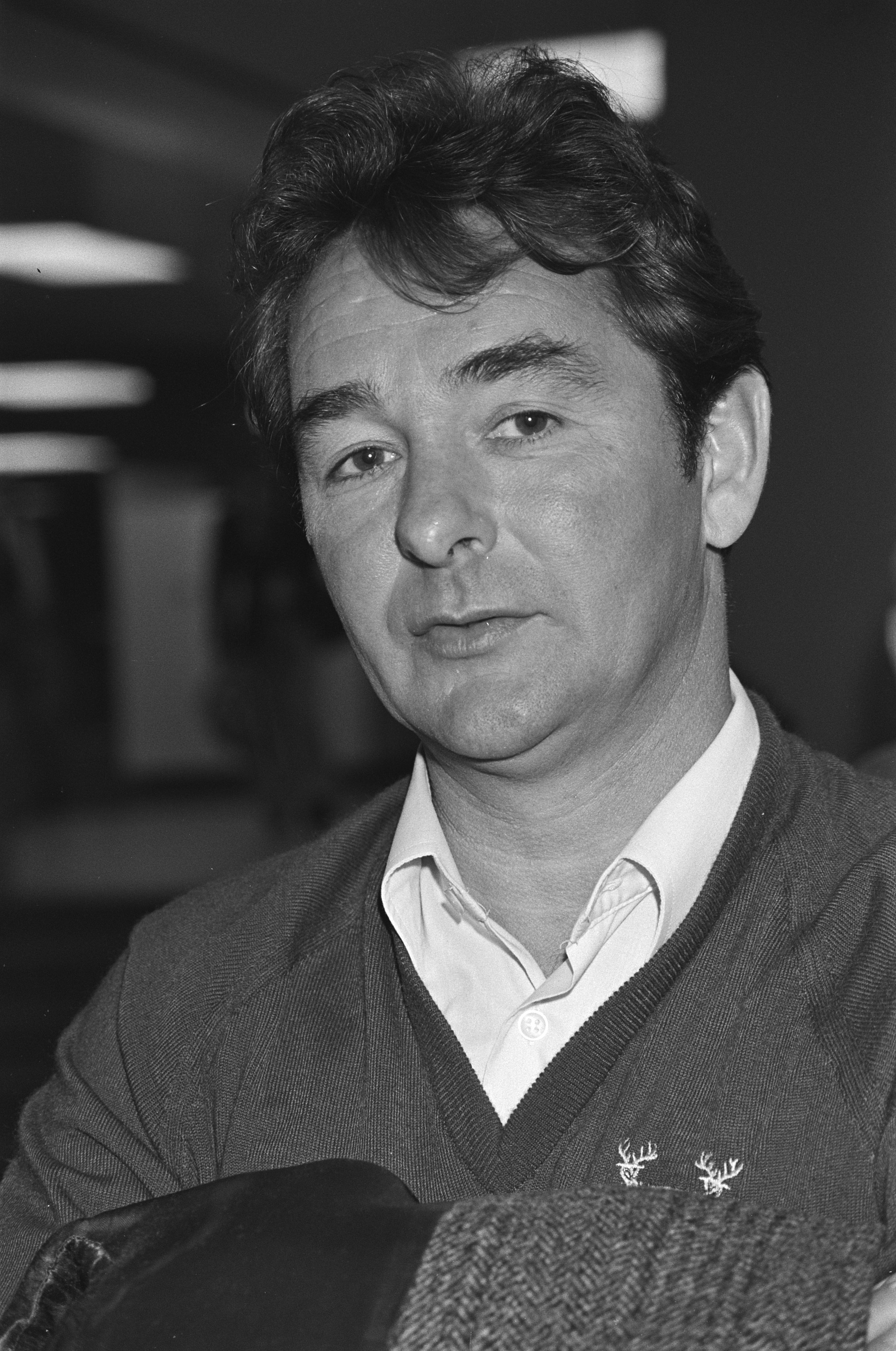
Kevin Phillips scored his 35th goal of the Sunderland, beating the post-war season scoring record held by Brian Clough (pictured in 1980).

Kinsella was jubilant: "we battled to come from behind and we just kept going and going ... every time we fell behind I felt we could lose, but we just kept pulling them back." The Sunderland forward Quinn claimed that despite the loss, his team were "the best footballing side in this division" but stated he was "delighted for Charlton because we've battled it out with them all season". The Sunderland manager Reid said of Gray who missed the final penalty: "our crowd's reaction to him was second to none. But I feel for the kid, he's heartbroken". Speaking of his team's performance, Reid noted: "I think our inexperience told in the first 45 minutes – we gave the ball away too cheaply". Mendonca offered sympathy to Sunderland's Gray, with whom he had attended Castle View School in Sunderland: "it must be a personal nightmare for him. Michael's a ... local Sunderland lad. It must hurt him so much." Mendonca was abused by some Sunderland supporters as he left the pitch: "that wasn't very nice, I'm gutted it's come to this ... I'd just like to say sorry to all my mates in Sunderland". Curbishley praised Mendonca: "he had four attempts in the game and scored three while the other was saved. What more can you ask?" Curbishley had avoided watching Gray's penalty, preferring instead to keep his head in his hands Talking about his penalty save, Ilić noted: "I hadn't made a save all game so I thought this would be a good time". Charlton held a civic reception at Woolwich Town Hall the day after the final, the players making the journey there from the valley on an open-top bus.

Nick Varley, writing in The Guardian suggested that the final was "the best game played at Wembley in 30 years". The Irish Independent described the match as "one of Wembley's most astonishing games" and "a day of unimaginable drama". Roy Collins of The Guardian, described Charlton's victory as "the most splendid of triumphs after the most splendid of games". In scoring his 35th goal of the season, Phillips broke Sunderland's post-war season scoring record previously held by Brian Clough. Mendonca became the first player to score a hat-trick in a play-off final. After the match Phillips stated that he was staying with Sunderland despite their failure to secure promotion, explaining that "all this transfer talk is a lot of nonsense. Playing in front of 40,000 every week, the support is unbelievable". Quinn also stated that he was keen to resolve his contract negotiations to allow him to remain at the club. Phillips, who had been carrying a shin injury for seven months, and Clark who had a hernia problem, were to have operations over the summer. Curbishley's assistant Les Reed left the club after the penalty shootout win to join the Football Association as a technical director; he had made the decision to leave before the final but delayed the announced. After the defeat, Sunderland's share price dropped from more than £5 to less than £4, with an estimated loss in value of around £10 million.

Sunderland ended their following season as champions of the First Division, amassing a record 105 points, and were promoted to the 1999–2000 Premier League. The record stood until Reading finished the 2005–06 Football League Championship with 106 points. Reid described their performance during the season as reaching "a level no one would have dreamed possible" after their Wembley defeat. Charlton's next season saw them finish in eighteenth position, five points from safety, and relegated back to the First Division.

== Legacy ==
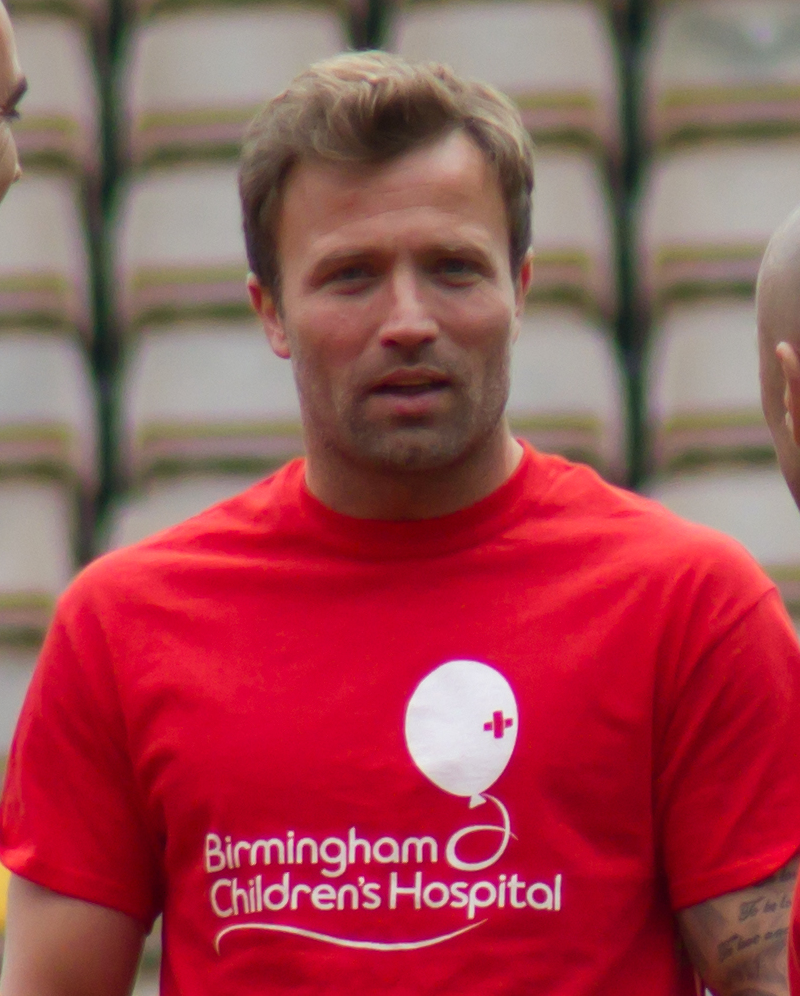
Michael Gray (pictured in 2014) missed the penalty which consigned Sunderland to defeat.

Gray has since reflected that the penalty miss "stayed with me for as long as I wore a Sunderland shirt, which was 12-and-a-half years". In an interview for British radio station Talksport in 2018, he confirmed that he "really didn't want to take [it] ... I just didn't want to be the person responsible for us losing such an important match. It wasn't a good penalty ... as soon as I hit it, I saw Sasa Ilić diving across to his left hand side. I knew he'd saved it. It was the worst feeling in the world." He has also noted that "that penalty miss was probably the defining moment of me becoming an adult ... it still hits you hard, even 20 years on". Curbishley later noted that Reid was the first person to enter the Sunderland changing room after the game and that he congratulated every player. In his 2017 autobiography, Reid described the match as "so remarkable and an outcome so dramatic that it transcended football". He also suggested that his selection of younger, less experienced players was an issue: "Inexperience was a big thing in the game. If you look at the back four I had out — Craddock, (Darren) Williams, (Darren) Holloway were all young players". Reid also spoked of how his team, and in particular Gray, had practised for a penalty shootout: "The irony is at the Stadium of Light practising pens, Micky Gray was drilling them in the top corner with an arrogance and aplomb. I said, 'Oh, it’s easy doing it here. Wait till it's Wembley and there’s 100,000 and you’ve got to do it.' As soon as I said it, I thought, 'Oh, no, no, please don't.' I shot myself in the foot".

Ilić played a further 26 times for Charlton before the club signed Dean Kiely. Before the shootout, Ilić recalled: "I had all my team-mates coming up to me saying, 'It’s all up to you.' I’m like, 'Guys, come on, it's up to everybody'". In a 2019 interview he explained "I found a 10p coin and kept flicking it to decide which way to go. That made me decide to go to my left – unfortunate for Michael Gray and great for us". The referee Wolstenholme later described it as the highlight of his officiating career. He noted that it "was probably the best game I ever refereed, not because of me personally but the game itself. It was perfect because nobody even mentioned me."

Miles Kent writing for the Bleacher Report in 2008 called it "Wembley's greatest game" and described the contest as "a tremendous thriller ... [which] has etched itself into folklore as one of the classic matches in the rich history of English football". In 2009, Eurosport listed the match as 19th best association football match of all-time. In 2014, the English Football League listed it first in its "Top 10 Football League Play-Off Finals", noting that it was "arguably the most unforgettable Play-Off Final". FourFourTwo's Merv Payne referred to the match as "the bonkers Wembley showdown that lives long in the memory", while in 2019, the Evening Standard described the final as an "epic showdown" and that it would "forever be a part club folklore". The South London Press described Ilić's save and Mendonca's hat-trick as "iconic, indelible moments in Charlton Athletic’s history". In 2019, Rob Stevens of BBC Sport suggested that the match was "arguably the best play-off final in English Football League history". Mick Collins, writing in his 2003 history of Charlton Athletic, suggested: "if life is a series of peaks and troughs, for many Charlton fans, Monday, 25 May 1998, at about 6 p.m., marks the highest point".

Sunderland faced Charlton in the 2019 EFL League One play-off final, with a goal in injury time securing the London club's promotion to the EFL Championship. It was the first time in the history of the play-offs that two teams would face each other in a final for a second time.
