= Keith Jones (English footballer) =

English footballer (born 1965)

Personal information
- Full name: Keith Aubrey Jones
- Date of birth: 14 October 1965 (age 61)
- Place of birth: Dulwich, England
- Height: 5 ft 9 in (1.75 m)
- Position: Midfielder

Youth career
- –1983: Chelsea

Senior career*
Years	Team	Apps	(Gls)
1983–1987	Chelsea	52	(7)
1987–1991	Brentford	169	(13)
1991–1994	Southend United	90	(11)
1994–2000	Charlton Athletic	158	(6)
2000–2002	Reading	39	(0)
Total		512	(37)

International career
1981	England Schoolboys	8	(0)
1983	England U17	2	(0)

Managerial career
- 2006–2007: Atlanta Silverbacks Women
- * Club domestic league appearances and goals

Keith Aubrey Jones (born 14 October 1965) is an English retired professional footballer, best remembered for his time as a midfielder in the Football League with Brentford and Charlton Athletic. He also played for Southend United, Chelsea, Reading and was capped by England at youth level. He later became a youth and women's coach.

== Club career ==
=== Chelsea and Brentford (1983–1991) ===
A midfielder, Jones began his career in the Chelsea youth system and made his senior debut in a 3–0 Second Division defeat to Barnsley on 26 March 1983. After one further appearance late in the 1982–83 season, he returned to the youth team and would not appear again until 1984–85, by which time the Blues had been promoted to the First Division. Injuries allowed Jones to break through into the team in September 1984 and he remained a squad player until September 1987, when he dropped down to the Third Division to join Brentford for a tribunal-fixed fee of £40,000. By the beginning of the 1988–89 season, Jones had been appointed club captain and was a part of the Bees teams which reached the sixth round of the 1988–89 FA Cup and the 1991 Third Division play-off semi-finals. His efforts during the 1990–91 season were recognised with his inclusion in the Third Division PFA Team of the Year. In October 1991, a contract dispute with manager Phil Holder saw Jones transfer to Second Division Southend United for a tribunal-fixed fee of £175,000.

=== Southend United, Charlton Athletic and Reading (1991–2002) ===
Despite making over 100 appearances for the club, Jones' four years with Southend United yielded little success on the pitch and he transferred to First Division rivals Charlton Athletic for a £150,000 fee in September 1994. In just under six years at The Valley, he was a part of two teams which won promotion to the Premier League – the first in 1998 after victory in the First Division play-off final and the second two years later, when the club won the First Division title. Jones was transfer-listed in May 2000 and signed a two-year contract with Second Division club Reading on a free transfer on 1 July 2000. Now the twilight years of his career, Jones was utilised as a squad player and was a part of the team which won automatic promotion to the First Division on the final day of the 2001–02 season. He was released in May 2002 and retired from football.

== International career ==
Jones was capped by England at schoolboy and U17 level.

== Coaching career ==
Jones began his coaching career in 2000, while still a player. He coached at Chelsea and Tooting & Mitcham United, before moving to the United States in 2006 to coach Atlanta Silverbacks Women. Jones moved to Arizona youth club SC del Sol in 2009.

== Career statistics ==
Appearances and goals by club, season and competition
Club	Season	League			FA Cup		League Cup		Other		Total	
Club	Season	Division	Apps	Goals	Apps	Goals	Apps	Goals	Apps	Goals	Apps	Goals
Chelsea	1982–83	Second Division	2	0	0	0	0	0	—		2	0
Chelsea	1984–85	First Division	21	2	0	0	5	2	—		26	4
Chelsea	1985–86	First Division	14	2	1	0	3	0	4 (Note: Appearances in Full Members' Cup)	0	22	2
Chelsea	1986–87	First Division	17	3	0	0	3	1	1	0	21	4
Chelsea	Total		54	7	1	0	11	3	5	0	71	10
Brentford	1987–88	Third Division	36	1	1	0	—		1 (Note: Appearances in Football League Trophy)	0	38	1
Brentford	1988–89	Third Division	40	3	8	2	4	1	4	0	56	6
Brentford	1989–90	Third Division	42	2	1	0	4	0	3	0	50	2
Brentford	1990–91	Third Division	45	6	3	2	4	1	8 (Note: Six appearances, one goal in Football League Trophy; two appearances in Football League Third Division play-offs)	1	60	10
Brentford	1991–92	Third Division	6	1	—		3	0	—		9	1
Brentford	Total		169	13	13	4	15	2	16	1	213	20
Southend United	1991–92	Second Division	34	5	0	0	—		0	0	34	5
Southend United	1992–93	First Division	29	1	0	0	0	0	0	0	29	1
Southend United	1993–94	First Division	22	5	0	0	0	0	0	0	22	5
Southend United	1994–95	First Division	7	0	—		0	0	—		7	0
Southend United	Total		90	11	5	0	4	0	9	1	108	12
Charlton Athletic	1994–95	First Division	31	1	0	0	—		—		31	1
Charlton Athletic	1995–96	First Division	25	0	0	0	0	0	3 (Note: Appearances in Football League First Division play-offs)	0	28	0
Charlton Athletic	1996–97	First Division	17	0	2	0	0	0	—		19	0
Charlton Athletic	1997–98	First Division	44	3	3	1	1	0	3	0	51	4
Charlton Athletic	1998–99	Premier League	22	1	0	0	3	0	—		25	1
Charlton Athletic	1999–00	First Division	17	1	1	0	0	0	—		18	1
Charlton Athletic	Total		158	6	7	1	7	0	6	0	178	7
Reading	2000–01	Second Division	24	0	3	1	0	0	1	0	28	1
Reading	2001–02	Second Division	16	0	1	0	0	0	0	0	17	0
Reading	Total		40	0	4	1	0	0	1	0	45	1
Career total			509	37	30	6	37	5	37	2	613	50

== Honours ==
=== As a player ===
Charlton Athletic

- Football League First Division: 1999–2000; play-offs: 1998

Reading

- Football League Second Division second-place promotion: 2001–02

Individual

- PFA Team of the Year: 1990–91 Third Division
- Football League Young Eagle of the Month: December 1984

=== As a manager ===
Atlanta Silverbacks Women

- USL W-League Central Conference: 2007
- USL W-League Atlantic Division: 2007

=== As an individual ===
- USL W-League Coach of the Year: 2007
