= Richard Rufus =

English footballer

- Born: Richard Raymond Rufus; 12 January 1975 (age 51); Lewisham, England
- Occupation: Professional football player
Association football career
- Position: Centre back
Senior career*
Years	Team	Apps	(Gls)
1993–2004	Charlton Athletic	288	(12)
International career
1996–1997	England U21	6	(0)
- * Club domestic league appearances and goals
- Criminal information
- Criminal information
- Status: Convicted
- Convictions: 12 January 2023
- Criminal charges: Fraud, money laundering, carrying out a regulated activity without authorisation
- Penalty: seven and a half years imprisonment

Richard Raymond Rufus (born 12 January 1975) is an English former professional footballer who played as a centre back, spending his entire career with one club, Charlton Athletic. He was also capped six times by England U21.

Rufus was part of both Charlton Athletic teams that earned promotion to the Premier League during the Alan Curbishley era, playing in the 1998 Football League First Division play-off final against Sunderland that were victorious on penalties. Two years later following relegation he was a regular in the team that won the First Division as champions. He would play for Charlton and in the top flight over the next few seasons before retiring at the end of the 2003–04 season. In 2005 he was voted as Charlton's greatest ever defender and was later inducted into their hall of fame in 2013. In January 2023, he was convicted of fraud.

== Club career ==
Born in Lewisham, London, Rufus progressed through the youth system at The Valley, making his debut for the club as a teenager in 1994 at the age of 19.

In the 1995–96 season, the defender was placed in the PFA Team of the Year. His most memorable moment for Charlton came at the end of the 1997–98 season. Charlton, having finished fourth in the First Division, were facing Sunderland in the play-off final at Wembley. With five minutes of normal time remaining, Charlton were losing 3-2 before Rufus scored his first ever senior goal from a corner, forcing the game into extra-time. After the resulting 4–4 draw, the Addicks went on to win the game 7–6 on penalties, thus gaining promotion into the Premier League.

Starting the 1998–99 season, despite being sent off in his first Premier League game against Newcastle United, Rufus developed into a key player in Charlton's ultimately unsuccessful bid to avoid relegation. He remained with the club and enjoyed a very productive 1999–2000 season scoring six goals and helping Charlton to win the First Division title. Back in the Premier League, Charlton were far more successful and remained in the top flight with ease. According to his defensive partner Gary Rowett, the pair and Luke Young were watched regularly by England scouts at this time.

Starting in 2001, Rufus began to suffer a series of injury setbacks. He missed half of the 2001–02 season and the end of the 2002–03 season. He underwent a series of knee operations in 2003 and at one stage looked to have returned to first time reckoning, having appeared on the bench for a League Cup game against Luton Town. He was, however, forced to have another operation done by Richard Steadman. The operation was unsuccessful, and he was forced to retire from football in 2004 at the age of 29. The 2002–03 season saw his final competitive appearance for the club coming against Liverpool on 21 April 2003. Weeks after his retirement, Rowett retired through the same injury too.

In his decade in Charlton's first team, he was regarded as one of the team's most important players. This was recognised by three player of the year awards and in 2005 he was voted by fans as Charlton's greatest ever defender. In May 2013, Rufus was inducted into the Charlton Athletic Hall of Fame.

== International career ==
He was capped six times by the England national under-21 team from 1996 to 1997.

== Personal life ==
Since retiring, Rufus, a born again Christian, has been involved with charity work, alongside friends and fellow Christian footballers Darren Moore and Linvoy Primus, as well as occasionally doing punditry work.

=== Legal issues ===
In December 2013, Rufus was declared bankrupt after a £6 million failed investment, which cost his church £5 million.

In November 2015, Rufus was branded a fraudster by a specialist civil court judge following an £8 million loss to investors. Rufus had operated a £16m Ponzi scheme involving over 100 investors including members of his family and congregation members of churches he had attended. He pocketed more than £3 million to fund his lifestyle. The Insolvency Service described the case as "one of the worst" ever. Rufus was given a 15-year bankruptcy restriction order. At the end of November, he left his roles with Charlton Athletic in the club's academy and the Community Trust following the fraud investigation.

In August 2019, Rufus was due to appear in court in respect of foreign currency exchange fraud of up to £9 million, between 2007 and 2012. The case was adjourned. After numerous delays the trial commenced in November 2022.

On 12 January 2023, his 48th birthday, Rufus was sentenced to 7 1/2 years in prison after being found guilty of fraud, money laundering and carrying out a regulated activity without authorisation at Southwark Crown Court. The judgment stated that Rufus claimed to be a successful foreign exchange trader and convinced people to invest in a "low-risk" scheme.

== Honours ==
Charlton Athletic

- Football League First Division: 1999–2000; play-offs: 1998

Individual

- PFA Team of the Year: 1995–96 First Division, 1999–2000 First Division
