= Paul Mortimer =

English footballer

Personal information
- Full name: Paul Henry Mortimer
- Date of birth: 8 May 1968 (age 58)
- Place of birth: Kensington, London, England
- Position: Midfielder

Senior career*
Years	Team	Apps	(Gls)
1986–1987	Farnborough Town		
1987–1991	Charlton Athletic	113	(17)
1991	Aston Villa	12	(1)
1991–1994	Crystal Palace	22	(2)
1993	→ Brentford (loan)	6	(0)
1994–1999	Charlton Athletic	86	(15)
1999–2001	Bristol City	23	(0)
Total		262	(35)

International career
1989	England U21	2	(2)

Managerial career
- 2007–2012: Charlton Athletic Women
- * Club domestic league appearances and goals

Paul Henry Mortimer (born 8 May 1968) is an English former footballer.

== Playing career ==
Mortimer played mainly in midfield, though he did play in defence at times. He started his career at Fulham, before signing for non-league side Farnborough Town in 1986. A year later, he joined First Division side Charlton Athletic. He became a regular first team player with Charlton, but after they were relegated in 1990 he moved onto Aston Villa the following year. After playing in all 12 games at the start of the 1991–92 season under Ron Atkinson, Mortimer suddenly returned to South London with Crystal Palace.

A number of injury problems, mainly hamstring, meant he did not play many games for Crystal Palace. After less than three years he was transferred back to Charlton Athletic, alongside David Whyte in exchange for Darren Pitcher. Under the management of former teammate Alan Curbishley, Mortimer often played well in the early part of the season but then suffered hamstring or back injuries. At the start of the successful promotion winning 1997–98 season, against Bradford City he scored a spectacular goal where he turned his full back inside out before a shot to the bottom right of the goal. Charlton went to win the match 4–1, and it was a performance that hailed of things to come that season. After helping the club into the Premier League in 1998, he again played in the country's top-flight, missing a crucial penalty against Leeds United towards the end of the season. He left the following year, moving to lower league side Bristol City, where he ended his career in 2001. At Bristol City, he scored once; his goal coming in a League Cup tie against Cambridge United.

== Coaching career ==
After his playing career, Mortimer held coaching roles with Wimbledon, Arsenal, Torquay United and Brentford, the latter two appointments being as first team coach under Leroy Rosenior, with whom he played at Fulham and Bristol City. He served as coach of the Sierra Leone national team for two matches in 2007, again under Rosenior. Later in 2007, Mortimer returned to Charlton Athletic to coach the club's women's team.

== Activism ==
Mortimer became active in Show Racism the Red Card, a UK anti-racism educational charity, near the end of his playing career and since 2009 he has been working for the campaign in schools in the South East and East of England as a coach and education worker. He entered the campaign's Hall of Fame in September 2011.
