= Richard Murray (businessman) =

English businessman

Richard Alan Murray is an English businessman. He was the chairman of Charlton Athletic on several occasions since the 1990s up until November 2019.

== Career ==
Murray set up Avesco plc, a specialist services provider to the entertainment and sports industry, in 1984, and was chairman/owner of it for over thirty years. In 1988 he received, on behalf of the company, the Emmy Award for services to the television industry. A subsidiary of Avesco, which grew into a giant-screen display company, was hired for the London, Beijing, and Rio Olympics Opening & Closing ceremonies. It also covered music festivals. The company grew to 700 employees world-wide and in late 2016, was sold to NEP, the global television broadcast provider.

== Football ==
Murray joined the board of Charlton Athletic F.C. in the early 1990s and is credited with being one of the key people in helping the club move back to The Valley in December 1992. He became chairman of the board at Charlton in 1995. During the first twelve years of Murray's tenure they saw two promotions to the Premier League and seven seasons in the top flight, it being the club's most successful period. Their fortunes on the pitch declined after Alan Curbishley's departure from Charlton in 2006, suffering relegation from the Premier League in 2007.

Over a period of several years Charlton were linked with a series of takeovers. These were encouraged by Murray as a means of solving Charlton's increasing financial problems. In December 2010 it was announced that the club had been sold to Charlton Athletic Holdings Ltd, a Swiss-registered company owned by Michael Slater and Tony Jimenez; Slater immediately replaced Murray as chairman, and Murray remained a director of Charlton Athletic. He was appointed as non-executive chairman of Charlton in January 2014, following Roland Duchâtelet's takeover of the club having resigned his Chairmanship, and became a non-executive director. He stepped down as non-executive chairman in August 2016.

== Personal life ==
Murray's wife died in 2003. He has two children.
