= Mark Robson (footballer) =

Former English footballer

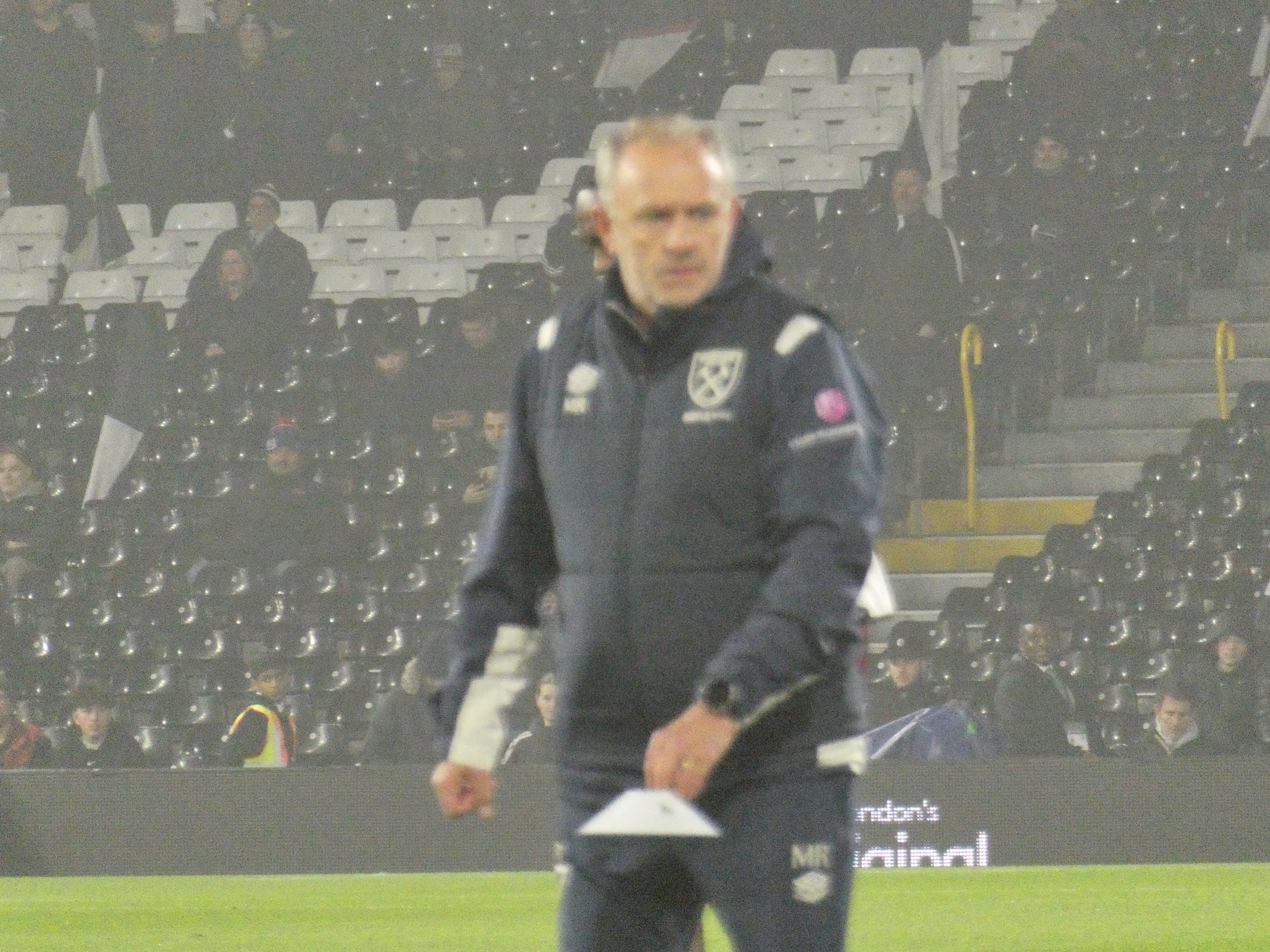
- Robson in 2026

Personal information
- Date of birth: 22 May 1969 (age 57)
- Place of birth: Upton Park, London, England
- Position: Midfielder

Senior career*
Years	Team	Apps	(Gls)
1986–1987	Exeter City	26	(7)
1987–1992	Tottenham Hotspur	8	(0)
1988	→ Reading (loan)	7	(0)
1989	→ Watford (loan)	1	(0)
1989	→ Plymouth Argyle (loan)	7	(0)
1991	→ Rosenborg (loan)	1	(0)
1992	→ Exeter City (loan)	8	(1)
1992–1993	West Ham United	47	(8)
1993–1997	Charlton Athletic	109	(9)
1997–1999	Notts County	33	(5)
1998	→ Wycombe Wanderers (loan)	4	(0)
Total		241	(30)

Managerial career
- 2012: Barnet
- * Club domestic league appearances and goals

Mark Robson (born 22 May 1969) is an English former footballer and current football coach.

During his playing career he played for Exeter City, Tottenham Hotspur, Reading, Watford, Plymouth Argyle, Rosenborg, West Ham United, Charlton Athletic, Notts County and Wycombe Wanderers.

== Playing career ==
Robson started his career at Exeter City as an apprentice in 1986. He made his debut on 11 October 1986 in a 2–0 win against Lincoln City, a game in which he also scored his first goal for Exeter City. Making 28 appearances in all competitions in his first season he came to the attention of Tottenham Hotspur transferring to them for £50,000 in 1987. Robson had to wait until 17 December 1988 to make his debut for Tottenham, in a 2–0 against West Ham United at Upton Park coming on as a substitute for Paul Walsh. After several loan spells, Robson moved to the team he supported as a boy, West Ham United in 1992. He made his debut for them on 16 August 1992 in a 1–0 away win at Barnsley and scored his first Hammers goal on 15 September in a 5–1 away win against Bristol City. He played 44 of a possible 46 league games and scored eight goals as West Ham gained promotion to the Premier League. He managed only three games for West Ham in the 1993–94 season before being sold for £125,000 to Charlton Athletic in November 1993. After four years with the Addicks he moved to Notts County where he ended his career in 1999.

== Coaching ==
Robson's first full-time coaching position was at Charlton's academy, where he started in 2000. He stayed in this position for nearly six years until 2006. In March he was promoted to reserve-team manager after Glynn Snodin joined Southampton. In May, after Iain Dowie replaced Alan Curbishley, he was designated 'Development Coach', working with both the first team and reserve team. In November, he was named Assistant Head Coach to Les Reed after Dowie was sacked. In January 2007, Robson was named first-team coach after former teammate Alan Pardew replaced Reed as manager. Robson gained the UEFA Pro Licence in the summer of 2007, a qualification which will allow him to manage a Premier League club. He left the club in summer 2008. He joined Gillingham as first team coach in August 2008, and although he was sacked along with Mark Stimson and others of the coaching staff in May 2010, following Gillingham's relegation to Football League Two, he was re-appointed and promoted to assistant manager to new boss Andy Hessenthaler just a few days later. Three weeks later, however, he resigned for personal reasons. In June 2010, Robson joined Peterborough United as a coach, signing a two-year contract. At the same time Robson was manager of semi-pro Burnham Ramblers U17s.

On 10 June 2012, Robson was appointed head coach at Barnet, with responsibility for the first team, as part of a restructuring of the club's football set up. As part of his role he would also be a major part of the football academy at the Hive, Barnet's training ground.

Robson was joined as head coach by Edgar Davids on 11 October 2012. On 28 December 2012, Robson and Barnet parted company leaving all first-team coaching matters with Davids.

In March 2013, he was appointed as the assistant coach of John Peacock for the England national under-17 team and in October 2013, he was appointed coach of the Norwich City under-21 development squad. Following Neil Adams confirmation as Norwich City manager, Robson was appointed assistant first team coach in June 2014. His tenure was short lived with Norwich terminating his contract on 10 November 2014.

On 12 November 2021, West Ham United announced that Robson has been appointed lead coach of their under-23 team.

== Managerial statistics ==
Updated 28 December 2012.

Team	Nat	From	To	Record				
Team	Nat	From	To	G	W	D	L	Win %
Barnet	(England)	10 June 2012	11 October 2012	13	0	3	10	0.00
Barnet – joint-coach with Edgar Davids	(England)	11 October 2012	28 December 2012	14	5	4	5	35.71

== Honours ==
Notts County

- Football League Third Division: 1997–98
