= David Whyte (footballer) =

English footballer

Personal information
- Date of birth: 20 April 1971
- Place of birth: Greenwich, London, England
- Date of death: 9 September 2014 (aged 43)
- Height: 5 ft 8 in (1.73 m)
- Position: Striker

Senior career*
Years	Team	Apps	(Gls)
- Greenwich Borough
1989–1994	Crystal Palace	27	(4)
1992	→ Charlton Athletic (loan)	8	(2)
1994–1997	Charlton Athletic	85	(28)
1997	Reading	0	(0)
1997	Ipswich Town	2	(0)
1998	Bristol Rovers	2	(0)
1998–1999	Southend United	26	(3)
Total		152	(37)
- * Club domestic league appearances and goals

David Whyte (20 April 1971 – 9 September 2014) was an English professional footballer who played as a striker.

== Career ==
Born in Greenwich, Whyte played for Greenwich Borough, Crystal Palace, Charlton Athletic, Reading, Ipswich Town, Bristol Rovers and Southend United.

He signed for Charlton Athletic in June 1994, alongside Paul Mortimer, in a part-exchange deal with Crystal Palace; Darren Pitcher moved in the opposite direction.

He retired in 1999, at the age of 28.

== Later life and death ==
Whyte died on 9 September 2014, at the age of 43.

== Honours ==
Crystal Palace

- Football League First Division: 1993–94
