= Dean Chandler =

English footballer (born 1976)

Personal information
- Full name: Dean Andrew Robert Chandler
- Date of birth: 6 May 1976 (age 50)
- Place of birth: Ilford, England
- Height: 1.83 m (6 ft 0 in)
- Position: Central defender

Youth career
- 19??–1994: Charlton Athletic

Senior career*
Years	Team	Apps	(Gls)
1994–1997	Charlton Athletic	3	(1)
1997	→ Torquay United (loan)	3	(0)
1997–1998	Lincoln City	0	(0)
1997–1998	→ Yeovil Town (loan)	9	(1)
1998	Chesham United	?	(?)
1998	Slough Town	0	(0)
1998–2000	Yeovil Town	37	(1)
2000–2001	Slough Town	2	(0)
2001	Woking	14	(0)
2001–2003	Purfleet	62	(0)
2003	Thurrock	?	(?)
2003–2004	Ford United	45	(0)
2004–2005	East Thurrock United	14	(3)
2005–2006	Leyton	20	(2)
2006–200?	Heybridge Swifts	?	(?)
200?–2007	East Thurrock United	?	(?)
2007–	Redbridge	?	(?)
- * Club domestic league appearances and goals

Dean Andrew Robert Chandler (born 6 May 1976) is an English former professional footballer. He last played for Redbridge and has represented England's Learning Disability team.

Chandler began his career as a trainee with Charlton Athletic, turning professional in April 1994 and making his league debut the following season. In 1994, Chandler along with teammate Lee Bowyer was found to have tested positive for cannabis after a training ground check. Both received bans of several months. On his return, Chandler found it difficult to break into the Charlton first team and in March 1997 was loaned to Torquay United. He made his Torquay debut against Lincoln City at Sincil Bank, but lasted only 20 minutes before going off with an ankle injury. He returned a fortnight later and played a further three league games for the Gulls.

Chandler was released by Charlton at the end of the 1996–97 season, having played just two league games, scoring once. In August 1997 he signed for Lincoln City, and played in the defeat away to Burnley in the League Cup on 26 August. Struggling to break into the first team, he was loaned to Yeovil Town on 28 November 1997. He scored on his Conference debut the following day against Cheltenham Town at the Huish. He remained at Yeovil until the end of January 1998, but returned to Lincoln at the end of the loan period.

He subsequently joined Chesham United, before signing for Slough Town on 26 November 1998. However, he could not agree terms with Slough and a day later was sold to Yeovil Town for £3,500. He was released by Yeovil manager David Webb on 4 May 2000, but returned on 3 July on a three-month trial, Webb apparently having a change of heart. He was then released again by Webb on 18 July 2000. according to Webb, 'after a lot of thought', but according to the Western Gazette, because he played in cricket match, arranged as part of teammate Tony Pennock's testimonial, whilst injured.

In September 2000, after a short spell completely out of the game, Chandler began training with Slough Town, with a view to signing for them once fully fit, which he duly did. He made his Slough debut in the 4–3 win over Aldershot Town in the Isthmian League Full Members Cup at Wexham Park on 24 October 2000, but then pick up another injury which restricted him to only three games all season. On 10 August 2001, he joined Conference side Woking on a free transfer after a successful trial period, but stayed only until the last week of November when he joined Purfleet. He was sacked by Purfleet in April 2003 for a 'breach of club discipline'.

He subsequently joined Thurrock, moving to Ford United in August 2003. He captained Ford to the First Round proper of the FA Cup, but scored an extra-time own goal as Ford lost at home to Port Vale. Ford changed their name to Redbridge the following year and Chandler was surprisingly released from the renamed club, joining East Thurrock United in June 2004.

In July 2004, Chandler made his debut for the England Learning Disability team, playing in a 16–0 win against hosts Sweden in the Global Games. He was sent off in the following match, against Brazil, for violent conduct as England progressed to the semi-finals with a 4–3 victory.

He left East Thurrock in November 2005, joining Leyton, but in April 2006 moved on to Heybridge Swifts.

He subsequently rejoined East Thurrock United and returned to Redbridge in December 2007.
