= Shaun Newton =

English footballer (born 1975)

Personal information
- Full name: Shaun O'Neill Newton
- Date of birth: 20 August 1975 (age 51)
- Place of birth: Camberwell, Greater London, England
- Position: Right midfielder

Senior career*
Years	Team	Apps	(Gls)
1993–2001	Charlton Athletic	240	(20)
2001–2005	Wolverhampton Wanderers	130	(12)
2005–2007	West Ham United	40	(1)
2007	→ Leicester City (loan)	9	(1)
2007–2008	Leicester City	10	(0)
Total		429	(34)

International career
1996	England U21	3	(0)
- * Club domestic league appearances and goals

Shaun O'Neill Newton (born 20 August 1975) is an English former professional footballer who played as a right midfielder for Charlton Athletic, Wolverhampton Wanderers, West Ham United and Leicester City before ending his professional football career in 2008.

== Club career ==
=== Charlton Athletic ===
Newton started his career at second-tier Charlton Athletic and worked his way up to the first team, making his debut as a 17-year-old on 14 August 1993 as a substitute in a 1–0 win over Birmingham City. He quickly became a first-team regular and was a virtual ever-present between 1995 and 1998. He was part of the team that reached the 1996 First Division play-offs, scoring inside the first minute of the first leg, which Crystal Palace won 3–1 on aggregate. This era also saw him recognised by his country as he won three England Under-21 caps during 1996. His debut came in a 2–0 win over Moldova U-21 on 31 August 1996.

He won promotion to the Premier League in 1998 after a play-off final victory over Sunderland, winning on penalties after a 4–4 draw, with Newton scoring Charlton's seventh penalty. Newton had earlier scored in the semi-final success over Ipswich Town to take them to Wembley.

The midfielder's first season in the top flight was interrupted by a knee ligament injury, but, although he recovered, the club's fortunes did not and they were relegated. He regained his spot in the side in the 1999–2000 season as the club won promotion again at the first attempt as champions. He found him often on the sidelines in the Premier League though, as Claus Jensen was signed and youngster Scott Parker emerged.

His only goal of the 2000–01 season came in an FA Cup third round replay against Dagenham and Redbridge on 27 January 2001. Frustrated by a lack of first-team opportunities as the team remained in Premier League, he requested a transfer in February and was placed on the transfer list. Although he remained at Charlton for a further six months, he finally left The Valley in August 2001, joining First Division club Wolverhampton Wanderers for £850,000, rising to £1 million if Wolves were promoted with him registered at the club. In total, he had made 285 appearances for Charlton, scoring 26 goals.

=== Wolverhampton Wanderers ===
Newton made a bright start at Wolves, scoring on his debut against Portsmouth and producing a career-best seasonal goal tally of 8. Despite this, a late slump saw the club fall away from the top into the play-offs, where they lost to Norwich City. However, the following season saw the midfielder win a third promotion to the top flight as the club won the play-offs, beating Sheffield United 3–0 in the final.

He was a first choice for the West Midlands club in the Premier League, something that had evaded him in his Charlton days, but Wolves only managed one season at this level. He retained his place as the 2004–05 season began, but the arrival of Glenn Hoddle as manager saw his opportunities diminish and he left the club in March 2005. In total, he made 130 appearances for Wolves, scoring 12 times.

=== West Ham United ===
Newton moved to West Ham United in March 2005 for an initial fee of £10,000. His transfer fee later rose to £125,000 after the club gained promotion to the Premier League via the play-offs in May 2005. This marked Newton's fourth promotion from the second tier and he was rewarded with a new two-year contract in July 2005. He appeared regularly for West Ham in their return to the top flight, albeit mostly as a substitute, and he was not selected for their FA Cup Final squad to face Liverpool at the season's end. His only goal for West Ham came during this season, the winner in a victory over Manchester City on 15 April 2006.

In July 2006, Newton was suspended for seven months, backdated to 20 May 2006, after testing positive for cocaine following West Ham's FA Cup semi-final victory over Middlesbrough in April 2006. He remained with the club, but only made five further appearances under his recently arrived former Charlton manager Alan Curbishley upon his return. He made a total of 49 league and cup appearances for West Ham, scoring once.

=== Leicester City ===
Newton joined Leicester City on loan in March 2007 until the end of the 2006–07 season. He scored his first goal for Leicester against Birmingham on 17 April 2007. He was given the number 16 shirt, the third player to wear the number that season after Josh Low and Luigi Glombard. He signed a permanent one-year deal with the Championship club on 6 July 2007 after the appointment of Martin Allen. However his time at the club came to an end in January 2008, with Leicester now onto their third manager of the season in Ian Holloway, when his contract was terminated by mutual consent. He retired later that year, after spell on trial at Yeovil Town in April.

== Personal life ==
In 2008 Newton was found guilty of nine counts of attempting to pervert the course of justice. Newton had attempted to bypass the speeding ticket procedure for fellow footballers, Teddy Sheringham and Bobby Zamora by "losing" the tickets which had been sent to them. He was given a 28-week sentence suspended for two years and ordered to do 180 hours unpaid community service. Newton was also ordered to pay £1,939 in costs and was disqualified from driving for one year. In July 2017, Newton was found guilty of a burglary committed while under the influence of alcohol and cocaine. He was sentenced to 100 hours community service.

== Honours ==
Charlton Athletic

- Football League First Division: 1999–2000; play-offs: 1998

Wolverhampton Wanderers

- Football League First Division play-offs: 2003

West Ham United

- Football League Championship play-offs: 2005
