= Jamie Stuart =

English footballer (born 1976)

Personal information
- Full name: Jamie Christopher Stuart
- Date of birth: 15 October 1976 (age 50)
- Place of birth: Southwark, England
- Position: Defender

Team information
- Current team: Greenwich Borough

Youth career
- ?–1995: Charlton Athletic

Senior career*
Years	Team	Apps	(Gls)
1995–1997	Charlton Athletic	50	(3)
1998–2001	Millwall	45	(0)
2001–2003	Bury	61	(1)
2003–2004	Southend United	26	(0)
2004	Hornchurch	14	(0)
2004–2009	Grays Athletic	194	(7)
2009–2011	Rushden & Diamonds	63	(3)
2011–2012	AFC Wimbledon	55	(2)
2012–2014	Sutton United	56	(3)
2014–2016	Margate	16	(2)
2016–2019	Grays Athletic	31	(2)
2019–	Greenwich Borough	2	(0)

International career^{‡}
1995	England U18	2	(0)
1996	England U21	4	(0)
2007	England National Game XI		

Managerial career
- 2006: Grays Athletic (caretaker)
- 2016–2019: Grays Athletic
- * Club domestic league appearances and goals as of 12:55, 10 March 2019 (UTC) ‡ National team caps and goals as of 20:12, 28 April 2017 (UTC)

Jamie Christopher Stuart (born 15 October 1976) is an English footballer who plays for Isthmian League South Division club Greenwich Borough as a defender. He started his career in the Football League with Charlton Athletic, Millwall, Bury and Southend United, before dropping into non-League football with Hornchurch, Grays Athletic and Rushden & Diamonds. Stuart went on to gain promotion back into the Football League with AFC Wimbledon, before dropping back into non-League with Sutton United and Margate – where he went on to become player/assistant manager.

He has also once acted as manager for Grays in the Essex Senior Cup in 2006 and later captained the side, before returning in May 2016 as permanent manager.

In 1997, Stuart was sacked by Charlton and served a six-month ban from football for failing a doping test. He was also charged with grievous bodily harm following an incident with Chris Beardsley, in a match with York City in September 2007. He was acquitted of the charges in September 2008.

Stuart was player/manager for Grays Athletic from 2016 to 2019.

== Club career ==
=== Charlton Athletic ===
Stuart started his career at Charlton Athletic, where he rose through the youth system and signed his first professional contract in January 1995. He made his first team debut for Charlton in the 2–0 defeat against Huddersfield Town in the First Division on 17 August 1996. He went on to make 50 appearances in the Football League, scoring three goals for the "Addicks".

During his time with Charlton Athletic, he earned four international caps playing for the England under-21 team in the Toulon Tournament against France, Brazil, Nigeria and Italy's under-21 teams.

He was sacked by Charlton and banned for six months by The Football Association in November 1997 for testing positive for cocaine and cannabis. He denied the charge, claiming that a cigarette he smoked had been laced with the cocaine.

=== Millwall ===
After serving his suspension, he signed for Millwall and made his debut on 8 August 1998, in the 1–0 away win at Wigan Athletic. Stuart picked up seven yellow cards and two reds in his first season with Millwall. The following season, 1999–2000, Stuart turned out a further seven times for Millwall before being released.

=== Bury ===
At the start of the 2001–02 season, he had an unsuccessful trial with Cambridge United. He was then set to sign for Northampton Town, however, Kevin Wilson was sacked and the club's plans to sign the defender were halted. Stuart eventually joined Bury in October 2001 on a short-term contract, which was later extended to a two-and-a-half-year deal in February 2002. He made his debut for the club in the 1–0 away win at Hartlepool United in the Football League Trophy on 16 October 2001. He was sent-off in his third game for Bury in the 5–1 defeat to Brentford. Stuart scored his only goal for Bury on 22 December 2001, in the 1–1 draw at home to Blackpool. Bury went 1–0 down in the first-half, before Stuart equalised in the 53rd minute, with a shot that went in off the post. During his 18-month spell with Bury, Stuart was a first-team regular, making 61 appearances in the Third Division, scoring once. Bury finished seventh in the league during the 2002–03 season, qualifying for the play-offs. He also gained a total of four red cards and four yellows in the 18-months he was with Bury, including a red card in the 2002–03 play-off semi-final first leg against AFC Bournemouth. Stuart was allegedly elbowed in the face by Wade Elliott, which resulted in his nose being broken and Stuart reacting by grabbing Elliott's shirt. Referee, Jeff Winter, adjudged Stuart had thrown a punch, whilst Andy Preece criticised Stuart for raising his arms to another player, defended him saying "I can't see why he thinks Jamie has punched him in the face...the explanation from the ref doesn't add up with what you see on the video."

=== Southend United ===
In June 2003, Stuart then joined fellow Third Division side Southend United for the upcoming 2003–04 season, saying he wanted to move nearer his family in London. He made his debut in the 3–0 home defeat against Mansfield Town in League Two on 23 August 2003. He was released from Southend United in May 2004 at the end of the season by manager Steve Tilson, having made 26 appearances in the Third Division for Southend United, collecting five yellow cards and failing to score.

=== Non-League career ===
==== Hornchurch & Grays Athletic ====
Stuart dropped down into non-League football with now defunct Hornchurch of the Conference South. He made fourteen appearances in the Conference South and seventeen in all competitions for Hornchurch, before a financial crisis at the club in November 2004 forced a number of players, including Stuart, to leave. He joined Grays Athletic, alongside Steve West and Lee Matthews, later being joined by former Hornchurch teammates Ashley Bayes, and John Martin. Stuart went on to win the Conference South and FA Trophy double with Grays that season, making 23 appearances in the league. The follow season, 2005–06 season, he made 34 appearances in the Conference National, reaching the play-offs finishing 3rd place, to be knocked out by Halifax Town 5–4 on aggregate. He also helped Grays Athletic retain the FA Trophy, defeating Woking 2–0 at Upton Park in the final. During the season, he received two red cards, the first against Exeter City on 19 November 2005 following a fight in the tunnel at half time with Exeter's Lee Phillips. The second red card came against Canvey Island on 2 January 2006, when Stuart was sent off in the 60th minute for punching teammate John Nutter.

The 2006–07 season saw Stuart compete in all Grays' 46 Conference National matches, scoring two goals. On 31 October 2006, Stuart managed Grays Athletic in the Essex Senior Cup, defeating Concord Rangers 1–0. In May 2007, Stuart was called up to the England National Game XI by Paul Fairclough for the Four Nations Tournament. He won the Players', Supporters' and Manager's player of the year awards for the 2006–07 season.

In October 2007, Stuart was held in custody by Essex Police on suspicion of assault, in relation to an incident involving Chris Beardsley which resulted in Beardsley's jaw being broken in two places. The incident occurred during a match with York City on 22 September 2007. He was charged with grievous bodily harm in December 2007. He made a further 43 appearances for Grays during the season, failing to score. Following the departure of Stuart Thurgood to Gillingham in November 2007, Stuart was handed the captaincy for the remainder of the season, having previous served as vice-captain. At the end of the 2007–08 season, Stuart was named as the Management player of the year. Stuart carried on his captain duties for the 2008–09 season. In February 2008, he pleaded not guilty to the charges of grievous bodily harm to Chris Beardsley. He went on trial on 2 September 2008, denying the allegations of intent and insisted it was an accident, trying to release himself of Beardsley's hold. On 5 September 2008, the jury acquitted Stuart of the charges causing Beardsley grievous bodily harm.

Stuart scored his first goal of the 2008–09 season in the 2–1 home defeat to Stevenage Borough on 25 September. Stevenage's goalkeeper, Chris Day, parried a header from Barry Cogan which dropped at Stuart's feet who hit a low hard shot from ten yards out. Grays faced League One outfit Carlisle United away in the FA Cup first round on 8 November. In the 1–1 stalemate, Stuart scored Grays' only goal in the 52nd minute, with a ten-yard volley. In the New Year's Day fixture of 2009, Stuart scored with a header from a free-kick taken by Sam Sloma, to hand Grays a 3–1 victory over Ebbsfleet United. Following the departure of manager Wayne Burnett, Stuart took the role of assistant manager at Grays, alongside Stuart Elliott in late January 2009.

==== Rushden & Diamonds ====
He signed for Rushden & Diamonds in June 2009, reuniting with former Grays manager Justin Edinburgh, who described him as "a great leader". Stuart was named as captain for the upcoming 2009–10 season. He won the 2009–10 fans' player of the season award, and was included in the Conference National team of the year 2009–10.

=== AFC Wimbledon ===
In January 2011, Stuart signed for AFC Wimbledon for an undisclosed nominal fee. He made 21 appearances, scoring once for Wimbledon in the 2010–11 Football Conference season. The team finished second, qualifying for the play-offs for promotion to League Two, which they eventually won with Stuart playing in all three games. In July 2011 Stuart was named as the captain of the newly promoted team; on 6 August he scored AFC Wimbledon's first-ever Football League goal in the first game of the season. Stuart played his last game for AFC Wimbledon on 5 May 2012, in the 3–1 win over Shrewsbury Town. In May 2012, Stuart was released from the club due to the expiry of his contract.

=== Sutton United and Margate ===
After being named club captain Stuart scored his first competitive goal for the club on 5 March 2013 against Bromley in a 4–3 win for Sutton United. In 2014, he moved to Margate earning promotion into the Conference South. Following Terry Brown's departure from the club, Nikki Bull was appointed as player/manager with Stuart named as his assistant.

== Management career ==
=== Return to Grays Athletic ===
On 10 May 2016, Stuart returned to Grays Athletic as player/manager of the Isthmian League Premier Division club. He left by mutual consent in February 2019.

== Personal life ==
Born in Southwark, London, Stuart is a father of two children and lives in Sidcup, Greater London.

== Honours ==
Millwall

- Football League Trophy runner-up: 1998–99

Southend United

- Football League Trophy runner-up: 2003–04

Grays Athletic

- Conference South: 2004–05
- FA Trophy: 2004–05, 2005–06

AFC Wimbledon

- Conference National play-offs: 2011

== See also ==
- List of doping cases in sport
