= Stuart Balmer =

Scottish footballer (born 1969)

Personal information
- Full name: Stuart Murray Balmer
- Date of birth: 20 September 1969 (age 57)
- Place of birth: Falkirk, Scotland
- Height: 6 ft 0 in (1.83 m)
- Position: Defender

Youth career
- ?–1987: Celtic

Senior career*
Years	Team	Apps	(Gls)
1987–1990	Celtic	0	(0)
1990–1998	Charlton Athletic	227	(8)
1998–2001	Wigan Athletic	101	(3)
2001–2003	Oldham Athletic	36	(6)
2002	→ Scunthorpe United (loan)	6	(0)
2002–2004	Boston United	47	(3)
2004–2005	Clyde	13	(0)
2005–2006	Hamilton Academical	15	(1)
2006–2008	St Mirren	0	(0)
Total		445	(21)

Managerial career
- 2017: Forfar Athletic (interim manager)
- * Club domestic league appearances and goals

Stuart Murray Balmer (born 20 September 1969 in Falkirk) is a Scottish professional footballer, who played as a defender.

== Playing career ==
Balmer was a young player at Celtic, having progressed from the Celtic Boys Club, in the late 1980s. Having never made a competitive first team appearance at Parkhead, he was sold to Charlton Athletic in August 1990 for a fee of £120,000. He has the distinction of being the first outfield player in the English league to be allocated the squad number 1; Charlton in the early 1990s allocated their squad numbers alphabetically, hence Balmer (and not a goalkeeper as is typical) wore the number 1 shirt for the season.

After eight years at Charlton, Balmer moved to Wigan in September 1998 for £200,000. In three seasons there, Balmer made over 100 appearances before going on to play for several lower league English sides. Whilst at Wigan he also played in the final as they won the 1998–99 Football League Trophy.

In July 2004, Balmer returned to Scotland as player/assistant-manager to Billy Reid at Clyde and then followed him when he moved to Hamilton Academical a year later. Balmer scored one goal for Hamilton, ironically in a game against former club Clyde.

== Coaching career ==
In January 2011, Balmer joined the coaching staff at Ross County as assistant to manager Willie McStay. McStay was sacked as manager a month later, but Balmer remained on the coaching staff under Jimmy Calderwood who was appointed to manage the side until the end of the season. Ross County only narrowly avoided relegation and Calderwood left at the end of the season. Balmer was re-appointed assistant manager by Derek Adams on his appointment as manager in June 2011, and that following season the management team helped Ross County win the Scottish First Division championship and promotion to the Scottish Premier League. In a further readjustment of the coaching staff at Victoria Park in November 2012, Balmer took on the duties of coaching the Under-20 side., before leaving the club completely in May 2013.

Balmer joined Airdrie in November 2013 as assistant to their recently appointed manager, Gary Bollan and subsequently followed Gary, as his assistant, to Forfar in December 2015. After Bollan was sacked by Forfar in September 2017, Balmer took charge of the side on an interim basis.

== Honours ==
Wigan Athletic

- Football League Trophy: 1998–99
