= John Robinson (footballer, born 1971) =

Wales international footballer

Personal information
- Full name: John Robert Campbell Robinson
- Date of birth: 29 August 1971 (age 55)
- Place of birth: Bulawayo, Rhodesia
- Position: Midfielder

Youth career
- 1987–1989: Brighton & Hove Albion

Senior career*
Years	Team	Apps	(Gls)
1989–1992	Brighton & Hove Albion	62	(6)
1992–2003	Charlton Athletic	332	(35)
2003–2004	Cardiff City	42	(3)
2004	Gillingham	4	(0)
2005	Crawley Town	8	(2)
2005	Lewes	7	(1)
Total		455	(47)

International career
	Wales U21	16	(3)
1995–2002	Wales	30	(3)
- * Club domestic league appearances and goals

John Robert Campbell Robinson (born 29 August 1971) is a former professional footballer who played as a midfielder. He made over 400 appearances during his professional career with Brighton & Hove Albion, Charlton Athletic, Cardiff City and Gillingham and also won 30 caps for Wales.

== Early life ==
Robinson was born in Bulawayo, Rhodesia (now Zimbabwe) to a Glasgow-born father and Rhodesian mother. His father's job later moved the family to Durban in South Africa before they settled in Sussex in order for Robinson to pursue his dream of playing professional football.

== Club career ==
After attending the Bobby Charlton Soccer School, Robinson began his professional career at Brighton & Hove Albion, signing his first deal with the club in 1987. In 1992, he moved to Charlton Athletic for £75,000; he would spend the bulk of his career with the south-east London club. In eleven years at Charlton, he helped the Addicks to two promotions and also enjoyed three seasons of Premier League football. He played in their dramatic win over Sunderland in the 1998 play-off final, winning 7–6 on penalties after a 4–4 draw, with Robinson himself scoring one of the penalties.

Robinson was released at the end of the 2002–03 season and joined Cardiff City following their promotion to Division One, making his debut on the opening day of the 2003–04 season in a 0–0 draw with Rotherham United. In October 2004, Robinson decided to leave Cardiff to sign for Gillingham to be closer to his mother, who was suffering from illness, and family. However, he retired after making just four appearances for the club after becoming disillusioned with professional football, stating "I haven't fallen out of love with playing football, it's the politics of football and becoming a commodity I don't like." He later had short spells with non-league sides Crawley Town and Lewes before retiring.

== International career ==
After winning 16 caps for the Wales U21 side, Robinson made his debut for the senior team in a match against Albania in 1995. He played 30 games and scored three goals for the senior team before announcing his retirement in 2002.

Born in Rhodesia, Robinson qualified to play for Wales by being a British passport holder – a route to qualification that had been removed by the time he retired from international football.

== After retirement ==
After leaving football, Robinson set up a property business with former Cardiff teammate Martyn Margetson and also runs his own football training school. In 2008, he managed Canterbury School (Ft. Myers, FL) to an unbeaten 15-0-2 season in his first year at the school. On 21 May 2013, Robinson was named the head coach of the SW Florida Adrenaline of the USL Premier Development League. In 2017 he was elected to the Charlton Athletic Hall of Fame.

== Honours ==
Charlton Athletic

- Football League First Division: 1999–2000; play-offs: 1998

Individual

- Welsh Footballer of the Year: 2000
- PFA Team of the Year: 1997–98 First Division, 1999–2000 First Division
