= The Valley (stadium) =

Football stadium in London, home to Charlton Athletic FC

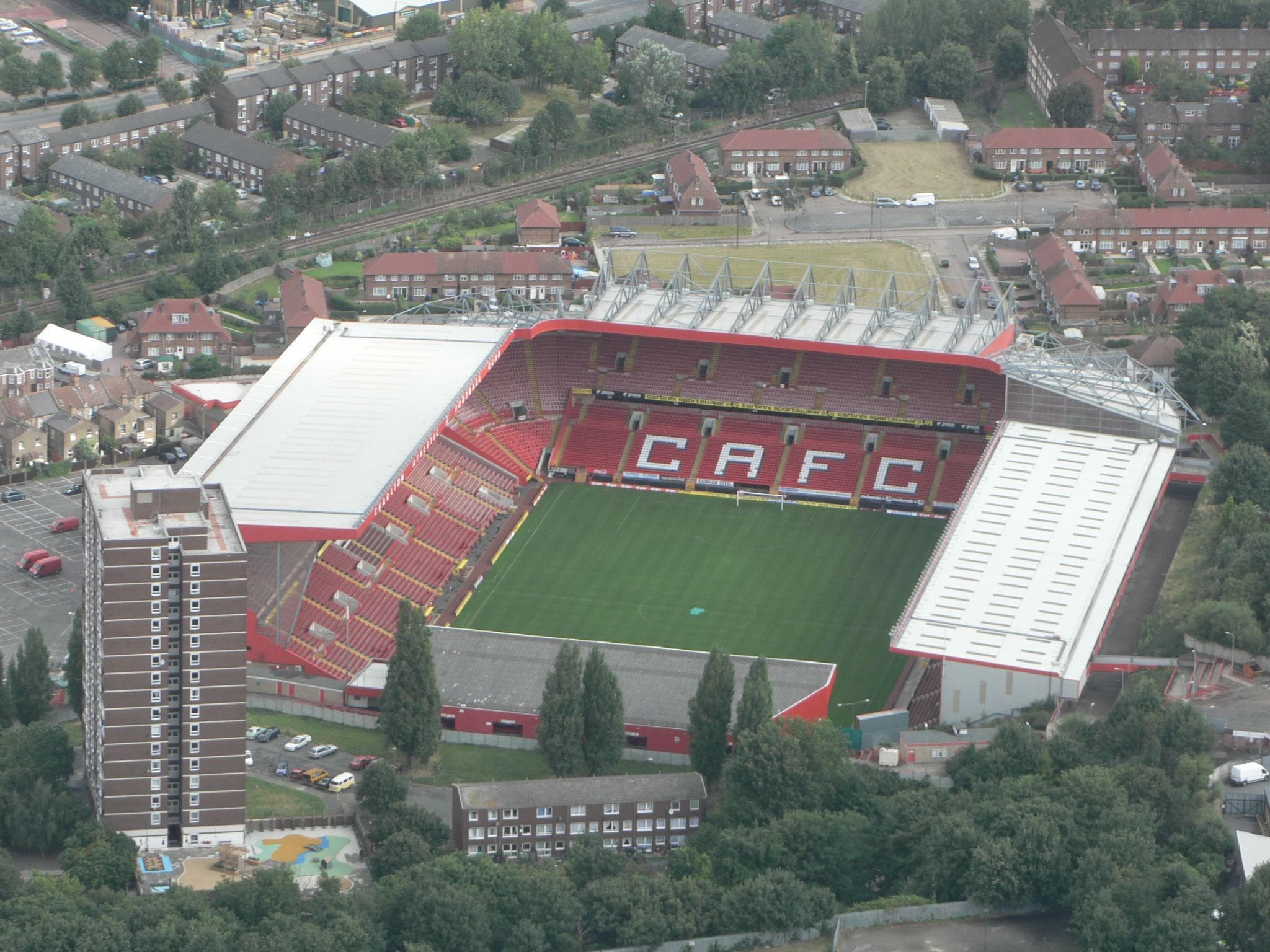
- Aerial view of the stadium in 2008
- Interactive map of The Valley
- Location: Charlton; London, SE7; England
- Coordinates: 51°29′11″N 0°2′11″E
- Capacity: 27,111
- Surface: Hybrid grass
- Field size: 112 yd × 73 yd (102 m × 67 m)
- Public transit: Charlton

Construction
- Groundbreaking: 1919
- Opened: 1919
- Renovated: 1991
- Expanded: 1994: east stand re-built; 1998: west stand re-built; 2001: north stand re-built
- Closed: 1985–1992

Tenants
- Charlton Athletic Football Club (1919–1985, 1992–present); London Broncos Rugby League Football Club (1996–1997, 1999–2000); Charlton Athletic Women's Football Club (2024–present)

The Valley is a football stadium in Charlton, London, England, with a capacity of 27,111, which has been the home of Charlton Athletic Football Club since 1919, with a period of exile between 1923 and 1924, and from 1985 to 1992. Charlton Athletic Women's Football Club has played all of their home matches at The Valley since 2024.

The stadium is served by Charlton railway station, which is a three-minute walk away from the stadium. SL11, 486, 161, 177, 180, and 380 London Buses stop outside the stadium. North Greenwich (Jubilee line) is the nearest tube station, while Woolwich station (Elizabeth line) is the nearest Crossrail station to The Valley.

== History ==
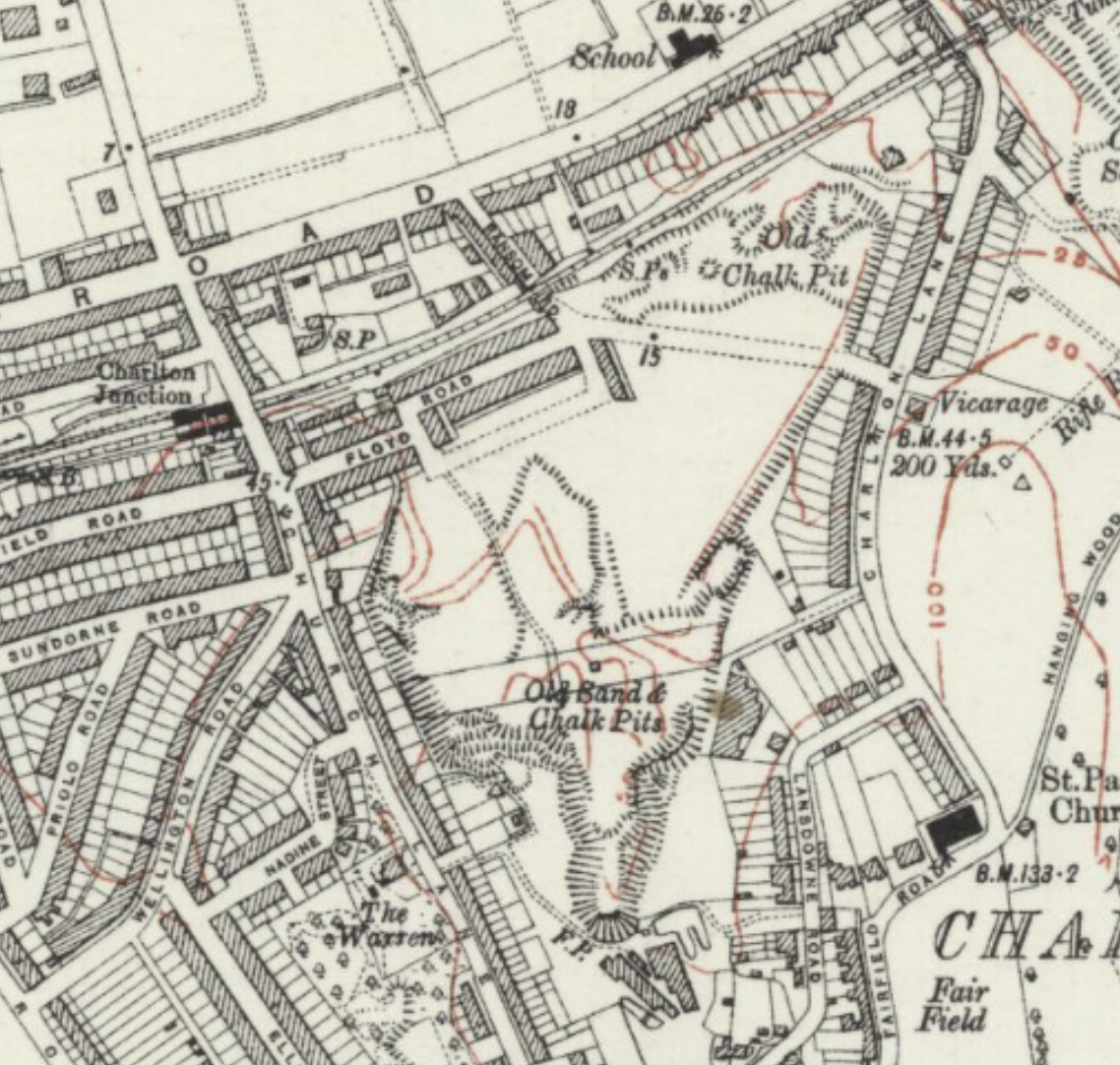
Location of The Valley, Charlton Athletic's football stadium (Ordnance Survey map, 1920)

In Charlton Athletic's early years, the club had a nomadic existence, using several different grounds between its formation in 1905 and the beginning of the First World War in 1914. The Valley dates from 1919, at a time when Charlton were moderately successful and looking for a new home. Fred Barned, the club’s honorary chairman, found an abandoned sand and chalk pit in Charlton, but did not have sufficient funds to fully develop the site. An army of volunteer Charlton supporters dug out a flat area for the pitch at the bottom of the chalk pit and used the excavated material to build up makeshift stands. The ground's name most likely comes from its original valley-like appearance. The club played its first game at the ground before any seats, or even terraces, were installed. There was simply a roped-off pitch with the crowd standing or sitting on the adjoining earthworks. The unique circumstances of the ground's initial construction by its supporters began an unusually intense bond between the club's supporters and the site that still exists.

For six months during the 1923–24 season, Charlton played at The Mount stadium in Catford as part of a proposed merger with Catford Southend FC which ultimately fell through, resulting in Charlton moving back to The Valley.

In 1967, Len Silver the promoter at Hackney made an application to open Charlton as a British League speedway club, and plans were proposed to construct a track around the perimeter of the football pitch. The application was enthusiastically supported initially, but was eventually ruled out on the grounds of noise nuisance.

For many years, The Valley was one of the largest Football League grounds in Britain. However, Charlton's long absence from the top level of English football prevented much-needed renovation, because funds dried up and attendances fell. Charlton were relegated from the First Division in 1957 and did not return until 1986. In 1972, the club was relegated to the Third Division for the first time in the post-war era. In the early 1980s, the club's debts led to it almost going out of business. A consortium of supporters successfully acquired the club in 1984, but The Valley remained in the possession of the former owner, and the club was unable to finance the improvements needed to meet new safety requirements. Shortly after the start of the 1985–86 season, Charlton left The Valley, entering into an agreement with Crystal Palace to share the latter's Selhurst Park, the first official groundsharing arrangement in the Football League in 36 years.

In 1988, the ownership of the club and The Valley were again united and, in a "grass roots" effort that harked back to the ground's initial construction, thousands of supporters volunteered to clean the venue, eventually burning the debris in a huge bonfire on the pitch. By that time, however, the large terraces were no longer seen as desirable or safe. Charlton Athletic supporters proposed to completely rebuild the stadium so that the club could return there at the beginning of the 1990s. However, the Greenwich Council overwhelmingly turned down the plans to renovate the ground. Club supporters formed their own local political party, the Valley Party, in response to the council's decision. The party ran candidates for all but two Greenwich Council seats, sparing the two councillors who had approved the new stadium plans. The party won almost 15,000 votes in the 1990 Greenwich Council election, successfully pressuring the council to approve the plans for the new stadium.

In 1991, construction began on the new Valley, and the club moved from Selhurst Park to West Ham's Upton Park. It was originally hoped that the club would return to the stadium before Christmas that year, however the re-opening faced a series of delays before finally occurring in December 1992. Charlton celebrated their return to The Valley on 5 December 1992 with a 1–0 victory over Portsmouth. Following which, the ground underwent several significant changes. The north, east, and west sides were almost completely rebuilt, giving the ground a capacity of over 27,000 by December 2001, when Charlton were in their second season of a stay in the FA Premier League which would last for seven seasons. The club had ambitions to extend the ground's capacity to over 40,000 by expanding the east side and completely rebuilding the south side, but these plans were abandoned after Charlton were relegated from the Premier League in 2007.

The 2004 edition of the Unity Cup was held at The Valley from 29 May to 2 June. Nigeria, Jamaica and Ireland competed in the tournament, with Nigeria being the eventual winners of the cup. The 2026 edition of the Unity Cup was held at The Valley from 26 May to 30 May, featuring Nigeria, Jamaica, Zimbabwe and India. Nigeria were once again champions.

On 21 May 2017, The Valley hosted a charity match, in which the YouTube group Sidemen played against other major YouTube personalities, who formed the YouTube AllStars. The match, the Sidemen's first one of three at The Valley, ended 2–0 for the YouTube AllStars and raised £210,000 split between the NSPCC and the Charlton Athletic Community Trust (CACT).

Charlton's former owner Roland Duchâtelet retained ownership of The Valley after selling the football club in 2020, but subsequent owner, Thomas Sandgaard, negotiated a lease for the club to use the stadium until January 2035. This lease was extended to June 2040 by the club's current owners, Global Football Partners.

In March 2024, Charlton announced their intention to build a safe standing area which would be completed over the summer. Additional to this, the club had worked alongside the Charlton Athletic Supporters Trust to implement one of the UK's first 'Youth Specific Sections' for fans. In 2024, it was also announced a new 'Desso', (now GrassMaster), hybrid pitch would be installed as part of a six-figure investment by the club's owners, and a £750,000 grant from the Premier League Stadium Fund. The pitch began to be laid in May of that year. As part of the investment, Charlton Athletic Women's Football Club would play all of their home matches at The Valley.

== Stands ==
=== The Covered End ===
Capacity: 9,743

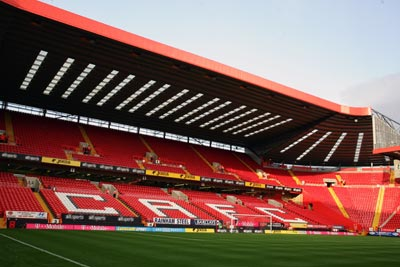
The Covered End

The North Stand upper tier was built as an extension of the 'Covered End', and is still called by this name. It was built during the 2001–02 season as part of the developments to bring The Valley's capacity to 26,500 after promotion to the Premier League in 2000. The North Stand houses the most vocal supporters in the ground, particularly in the upper tier, and a drummer. There are also restaurants and executive suites inside the stand.

A safe standing area was installed in the Covered End Upper ahead of Charlton's 2024–25 season. It is in the back eight rows and has a capacity of 1,064. The club has also received provisional permission to install a safe standing area in the Covered End Lower.

=== Alan Curbishley Stand ===
Capacity: 5,802

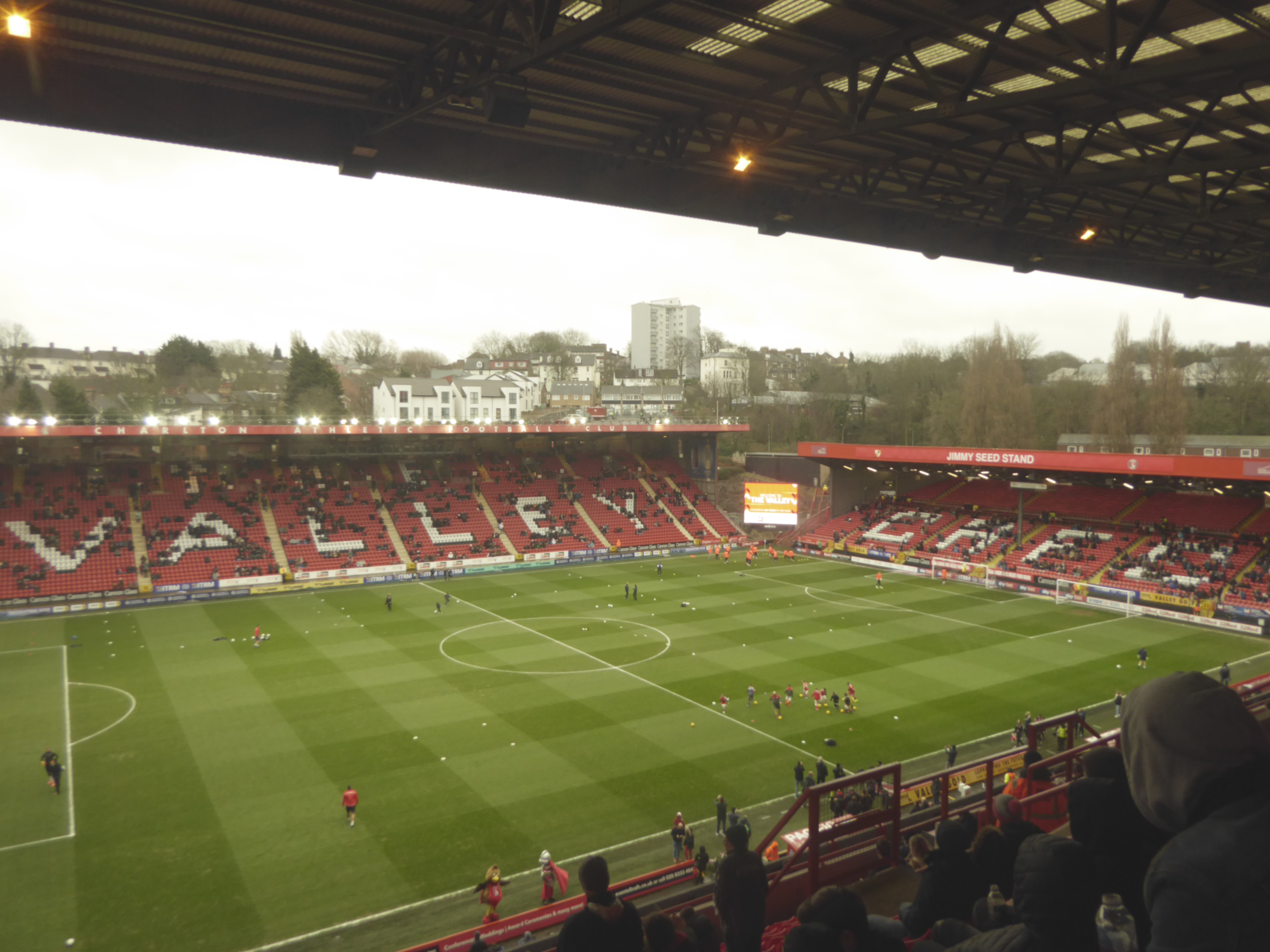
The Alan Curbishley Stand (left)

The East Stand was constructed during the 1993–94 season and fully completed in 1994. As part of the first development to the ground since the return in 1992, it replaced the massive east terrace, which had remained closed and prohibited from use since the mid-1980s after the Bradford City stadium fire. The East Stand consists of a single tier of seats and houses the television gantry, and also has numerous executive boxes. Occasionally, for FA and League Cup matches, part of the East Stand is used to house away supporters if the demand for away team tickets is high. On 9 April 2021, the club announced that from the start of 2021–22 season, the stand would be renamed to the Alan Curbishley Stand in honour of the former player and manager, and to celebrate the 30th anniversary of when Curbishley was appointed manager of the club, a role he held from 1991 to 2006.

=== West Stand ===
Capacity: 8,097

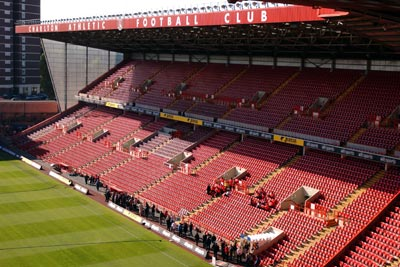
The West Stand

The West Stand upper tier was built in 1998 after Charlton's first promotion to the Premier League. This is the main stand at The Valley with the largest capacity, and also houses the club's offices, as well as the director's box, board room dug-outs, changing rooms and the commercial centre (ticket office). There are also many conferencing rooms in this stand which are used for official and community events. There is a large statue of Sam Bartram (considered to be Charlton's finest player) at the entrance of the West Stand.

=== Jimmy Seed Stand ===
Capacity: 3,469

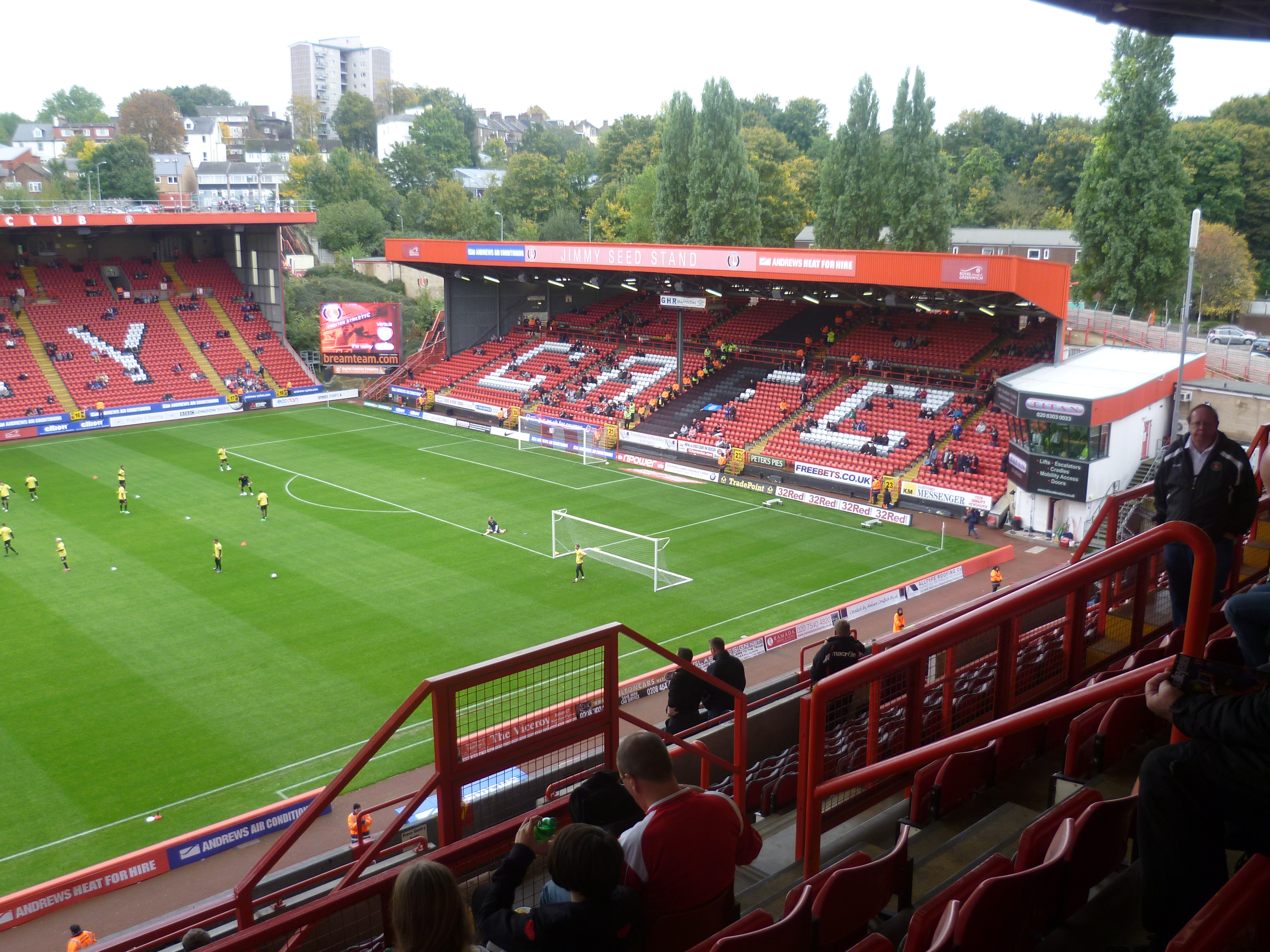
The Jimmy Seed Stand

The Jimmy Seed (or South) Stand is the oldest part of the ground, and dates from the early 1980s. This stand is named after Charlton's manager, Jimmy Seed (1895–1966), with whom Charlton won the 1947 FA Cup. This stand has a capacity of around 3,000 and hosts the away supporters at games. It is also the only part of The Valley with a supporting pillar.

== Details ==
=== Records ===
- Loudest rock concert ever: The Who, 31 May 1976 – 126 dB, measured at a distance of 32 metres (105 ft) from the speakers
- Record attendance: 75,031 vs. Aston Villa, 12 February 1938 (FA Cup Fifth Round)
- Record league attendance: 68,160 vs. Arsenal, 17 October 1936 (Football League First Division)
- Record all-seater attendance: 27,111 vs. Chelsea, 17 September 2005; vs. Tottenham Hotspur, 1 October 2005; vs. Liverpool, 16 December 2006; vs. Chelsea, 3 February 2007; vs. West Ham United, 24 February 2007; vs. Sheffield United, 21 April 2007 (all Premier League)
- Record women's attendance: 3,979 vs. Leicester City, 23 May 2026 (Women's Super League 2 promotion play-off)

=== Average attendances ===
The Valley's highest average attendance came in the 1948–49 season when crowds averaged 40,216, making Charlton one of only thirteen clubs in English football to achieve a seasonal average of 40,000+. The Valley's lowest average attendance is 5,104 from the 1984–85 season.

Highest

Season	Average	Division
1948–49	40,216	Division One
1947–48	36,248	Division One
1949–50	34,567	Division One
1946–47	32,401	Division One
1936–37	31,086	Division One

Lowest

Season	Average	Division
1984–85	5,104	Division Two
1973–74	5,306	Division Three
1972–73	5,658	Division Three
1922–23	6,175	Division Three South
1981–82	6,649	Division Two

Average attendance for every season since 1993–94, the first full season since Charlton returned to The Valley.

Season	Average	Division
1993–94	8,056	First Division
1994–95	10,216	First Division
1995–96	11,185	First Division
1996–97	11,081	First Division
1997–98	13,275	First Division
1998–99	19,823	Premier League
1999–2000	19,541	First Division
2000–01	20,020	Premier League
2001–02	24,135	Premier League
2002–03	26,235	Premier League
2003–04	26,278	Premier League
2004–05	26,378	Premier League
2005–06	26,171	Premier League
2006–07	26,197	Premier League
2007–08	23,159	Championship
2008–09	20,894	Championship
2009–10	17,407	League One
2010–11	15,582	League One
2011–12	17,485	League One
2012–13	18,499	Championship
2013–14	16,134	Championship
2014–15	16,708	Championship
2015–16	15,632	Championship
2016–17	11,162	League One
2017–18	11,846	League One
2018–19	11,827	League One
2019–20	18,128*	Championship
2020–21	1,500**	League One
2021–22	15,592	League One
2022–23	13,436	League One
2023–24	13,481	League One
2024–25	15,255	League One
2025–26	20,066	Championship

*Last 5 home matches played behind closed doors due to the COVID-19 pandemic.

**Due to the COVID-19 pandemic all home matches were played behind closed doors except for two matches which had limited crowds.
