= 1998–99 Charlton Athletic F.C. season =

Charlton Athletic
1998–99 season
- Chairman: Richard Murray
- Manager: Alan Curbishley
- Stadium: The Valley
- FA Premier League: 18th (relegated)
- FA Cup: Third round
- League Cup: Third round
- Top goalscorer: Clive Mendonca (8)
- Highest home attendance: 20,046 vs. Chelsea (3 April 1999)
- Lowest home attendance: 11,726 vs. Queens Park Rangers (22 September 1998)
- Average home league attendance: 19,816
Home colours	Away colours

During the 1998–99 English football season, Charlton Athletic competed in the FA Premier League. The club also competed in the FA Cup, and the League Cup.

== Season summary ==
Back in the top flight after an eight-year exile, Charlton Athletic made a good start to the FA Premier League campaign, including a 5–0 thrashing of Southampton in their first home match of the season as Clive Mendonca scored a hat-trick, and Alan Curbishley was voted Manager of the Month for August. Their form soon dipped, but they were never completely outclassed by the rest of the Premier League sides. In the end, they were the last team to make the drop following a late revival by Southampton. But Curbishley's job was still safe, as the board had every confidence in his ability to regain a hard-earned place among the elite for the Addicks. The board's faith would prove well-placed as Charlton was promoted back to the Premier League as champions the next season.

Key players in Charlton's ultimately unsuccessful bid to avoid relegation included Richard Rufus despite his being sent off in his first Premier League game against Newcastle United.

== Kit ==
Charlton's kit was manufactured by Le Coq Sportif and sponsored by Mesh Computers.

== Final league table ==
Pos	Team	Pld	W	D	L	GF	GA	GD	Pts	Qualification or relegation
16	Wimbledon	38	10	12	16	40	63	−23	42	
17	Southampton	38	11	8	19	37	64	−27	41	
18	Charlton Athletic (R)	38	8	12	18	41	56	−15	36	Relegation to Football League First Division
19	Blackburn Rovers (R)	38	7	14	17	38	52	−14	35	Relegation to Football League First Division
20	Nottingham Forest (R)	38	7	9	22	35	69	−34	30	Relegation to Football League First Division

Source: Premier League
Rules for classification: 1) points; 2) goal difference; 3) number of goals scored.
(R) Relegated

Results summary

Overall								Home						Away					
Pld	W	D	L	GF	GA	GD	Pts	W	D	L	GF	GA	GD	W	D	L	GF	GA	GD
38	8	12	18	41	56	−15	36	4	7	8	20	20	0	4	5	10	21	36	−15

Source: 1998-99 FA Premier League table

Results by round

Round	1	2	3	4	5	6	7	8	9	10	11	12	13	14	15	16	17	18	19	20	21	22	23	24	25	26	27	28	29	30	31	32	33	34	35	36	37	38
Ground	A	H	A	A	H	A	H	A	A	H	A	H	H	A	H	A	A	H	A	H	A	H	H	H	H	A	H	A	A	H	A	A	H	H	A	H	A	H
Result	D	W	D	L	L	D	D	W	L	W	D	D	D	L	L	L	L	L	L	L	L	D	L	W	W	W	D	L	D	L	W	L	D	L	L	D	W	L
Position	6	1	3	10	12	14	14	13	14	9	10	11	11	13	15	16	16	16	18	18	19	18	19	18	18	16	16	17	17	19	16	16	17	18	18	19	18	18

Source: 11v11.com: 1998-99 Charlton Athletic results
A = Away; H = Home; W = Win; D = Draw; L = Loss

== Results ==
Charlton Athletic's score comes first

=== Legend ===
Win	Draw	Loss

=== FA Premier League ===
Date	Opponent	Venue	Result	Attendance	Scorers
15 August 1998	Newcastle United	A	0–0	36,719	
22 August 1998	Southampton	H	5–0	16,488	Robinson, Redfearn, Mendonca (3, 1 pen)
29 August 1998	Arsenal	A	0–0	38,014	
9 September 1998	Manchester United	A	1–4	55,147	Kinsella
12 September 1998	Derby County	H	1–2	19,516	Mendonca (pen)
19 September 1998	Liverpool	A	3–3	44,526	Rufus, Mendonca, S Jones
26 September 1998	Coventry City	H	1–1	20,043	Hunt
3 October 1998	Nottingham Forest	A	1–0	22,661	Youds
17 October 1998	Chelsea	A	1–2	34,639	Youds
24 October 1998	West Ham United	H	4–2	20,043	Tiler, Mills, Hunt, Redfearn (pen)
2 November 1998	Tottenham Hotspur	A	2–2	32,202	Hunt (2)
7 November 1998	Leicester City	H	0–0	20,021	
14 November 1998	Middlesbrough	H	1–1	20,043	Mendonca (pen)
21 November 1998	Leeds United	A	1–4	32,487	Mortimer
28 November 1998	Everton	H	1–2	20,043	Kinsella
5 December 1998	Blackburn Rovers	A	0–1	22,568	
12 December 1998	Sheffield Wednesday	A	0–3	26,010	
21 December 1998	Aston Villa	H	0–1	20,043	
26 December 1998	Wimbledon	A	1–2	19,106	Redfearn
28 December 1998	Arsenal	H	0–1	20,043	
9 January 1999	Southampton	A	1–3	15,222	Hunt
17 January 1999	Newcastle United	H	2–2	20,043	Bright, Pringle
31 January 1999	Manchester United	H	0–1	20,043	
8 February 1999	Wimbledon	H	2–0	20,002	Pringle, Blackwell (own goal)
13 February 1999	Liverpool	H	1–0	20,043	K Jones
20 February 1999	Derby County	A	2–0	27,853	Hunt, Pringle
27 February 1999	Nottingham Forest	H	0–0	20,007	
6 March 1999	Coventry City	A	1–2	20,259	Robinson
13 March 1999	Leicester City	A	1–1	20,220	Mendonca
3 April 1999	Chelsea	H	0–1	20,046	
5 April 1999	West Ham United	A	1–0	26,041	Stuart
10 April 1999	Middlesbrough	A	0–2	34,529	
17 April 1999	Leeds United	H	1–1	20,043	Stuart
20 April 1999	Tottenham Hotspur	H	1–4	20,043	Kinsella
24 April 1999	Everton	A	1–4	40,089	Stuart
1 May 1999	Blackburn Rovers	H	0–0	20,041	
8 May 1999	Aston Villa	A	4–3	37,705	Barry (own goal), Mendonca, Robinson, Mills
16 May 1999	Sheffield Wednesday	H	0–1	20,043	

=== FA Cup ===
Round	Date	Opponent	Venue	Result	Attendance	Goalscorers
R3	2 January 1999	Blackburn Rovers	A	0–2	16,631	

=== League Cup ===
Round	Date	Opponent	Venue	Result	Attendance	Goalscorers
R2 1st Leg	16 September 1998	Queens Park Rangers	A	2–0	6,497	Newton, Harper (own goal)
R2 2nd Leg	22 September 1998	Queens Park Rangers	H	1–0 (won 3–0 on agg)	11,726	Youds
R3	27 October 1998	Leicester City	H	1–2	19,671	Mortimer

== First-team squad ==
Squad at end of season

Note: Flags indicate national team as defined under FIFA eligibility rules; some limited exceptions apply. Players may hold more than one non-FIFA nationality.

No.	Pos.	Nation	Player
1	GK	YUG	Saša Ilić (Note: Ilić was born in Melbourne, Australia, but also qualified to represent FR Yugoslavia internationally and made his international debut for FR Yugoslavia in December 1998.)
2	DF	ENG	Danny Mills
3	DF	ENG	Chris Powell
4	MF	ENG	Neil Redfearn
5	DF	ENG	Richard Rufus
6	DF	ENG	Eddie Youds
7	MF	ENG	Shaun Newton
8	MF	IRL	Mark Kinsella (captain)
9	FW	ENG	Andy Hunt
10	FW	ENG	Clive Mendonca
11	MF	WAL	John Robinson (Note: Robinson was born in Bulawayo, Rhodesia (now Zimbabwe), but also qualified to represent Wales internationally and represented them at U-21 level before making his international debut for Wales in 1995.)
12	DF	ENG	Steve Brown
13	GK	AUS	Andy Petterson
14	DF	WAL	Mark Bowen
15	MF	ENG	Keith Jones
16	MF	ENG	Paul Mortimer
17	FW	ENG	Mark Bright
18	MF	ENG	Matty Holmes
19	FW	ENG	Steve Jones
20	DF	ENG	Anthony Barness

No.	Pos.	Nation	Player
22	FW	ENG	Kevin Lisbie (Note: Lisbie was born in Hackney, England, but also qualified to represent Jamaica internationally and would make his international debut for Jamaica in 2002.)
23	DF	ENG	Carl Tiler
24	MF	ENG	Kevin Nicholls
25	DF	ENG	Gary Poole
26	DF	ENG	Paul Konchesky
27	MF	ENG	Scott Parker
28	GK	ENG	Simon Royce
29	FW	ENG	Bradley Allen
30	GK	ENG	Mike Salmon
31	DF	ENG	Anthony Allman
32	DF	ENG	Jonathan Fortune
33	DF	ENG	Kevin James
34	DF	ENG	Matthew Lee
35	GK	ENG	Paul Smith
36	MF	ENG	Frazer Toms
37	MF	ENG	John Barnes (Note: Barnes was born in Kingston, Jamaica, but was raised in England from the age of 12 and represented them at U-21 level before making his international debut for England in May 1983.)
38	DF	ENG	Dave Tuttle (on loan from Crystal Palace)
39	FW	SWE	Martin Pringle
40	MF	ENG	Graham Stuart
41	MF	ENG	Michael Beale

=== Left club during season ===
Note: Flags indicate national team as defined under FIFA eligibility rules; some limited exceptions apply. Players may hold more than one non-FIFA nationality.

No.	Pos.	Nation	Player
13	GK	AUS	Andy Petterson (on loan to Portsmouth)
21	MF	ENG	Paul Emblen (to Wycombe Wanderers)
23	DF	SCO	Stuart Balmer (to Wigan Athletic)

No.	Pos.	Nation	Player
37	DF	NGA	Emeka Ifejiagwa (to Osasuna)
-	DF	ENG	Lee Doherty (to Brighton & Hove Albion)

=== Reserve squad ===
Note: Flags indicate national team as defined under FIFA eligibility rules; some limited exceptions apply. Players may hold more than one non-FIFA nationality.

No.	Pos.	Nation	Player
—	GK	WAL	Sam Turner
—	MF	ENG	Kemal Izzet
—	MF	NZL	Adrian Webster

No.	Pos.	Nation	Player
—	FW	ENG	Charlie MacDonald
—	FW	ENG	Mark McCammon (Note: McCammon was born in Barnet, England, but also qualified to represent Barbados internationally and would make his international debut for Barbados in 2006.)

== Transfers ==
=== In ===
Date	Pos.	Name	From	Fee
22 June 1998	DF	Chris Powell	Derby County	£800,000
25 June 1998	MF	Neil Redfearn	Barnsley	£1,000,000
1 July 1998	FW	Andy Hunt	West Bromwich Albion	Free transfer
2 July 1998	GK	Paul Smith	Walton and Hersham	Free transfer
29 September 1998	DF	Carl Tiler	Everton	£700,000
8 February 1999	DF	John Barnes	Newcastle United	Free transfer
5 March 1999	FW	Martin Pringle	Benfica	£800,000
9 March 1999	FW	Mark McCammon	Cambridge United	Undisclosed
23 March 1999	MF	Graham Stuart	Sheffield United	£1,100,000
25 May 1999	GK	Dean Kiely	Bury	£1,000,000

=== Out ===
Date	Pos.	Name	To	Fee
1 July 1998	DF	Phil Chapple	Peterborough United	Free transfer
17 September 1998	MF	Paul Emblen	Wycombe Wanderers	£60,000
18 September 1998	DF	Stuart Balmer	Wigan Athletic	£200,000
19 March 1999	DF	Lee Doherty	Brighton & Hove Albion	Undisclosed
24 May 1999	MF	Adrian Webster	Colchester United	Free transfer

Transfers in: ▼£5,400,000
Transfers out: ▲£260,000
Total spending: ▼£5,140,000

== Statistics ==
=== Appearances, goals and cards ===
(Starting appearances + substitute appearances)

No.	Pos.	Name	League		FA Cup		League Cup		Total		Discipline	
No.	Pos.	Name	Apps	Goals	Apps	Goals	Apps	Goals	Apps	Goals	Yellow card	Red card
1	GK	(Federal Republic of Yugoslavia) Saša Ilić	23	0	1	0	2	0	26	0	1	0
2	DF	(England) Danny Mills	36	2	1	0	3	0	40	2	10	0
3	DF	(England) Chris Powell	38	0	1	0	3	0	42	0	2	0
4	MF	(England) Neil Redfearn	29+1	3	1	0	2	0	32+1	3	9	0
5	DF	(England) Richard Rufus	27	1	1	0	3	0	31	1	2	2
6	DF	(England) Eddie Youds	21+1	2	1	0	3	1	25+1	3	7	0
7	MF	(England) Shaun Newton	13+3	0	0+1	0	1+1	1	14+5	1	2	0
8	MF	(Republic of Ireland) Mark Kinsella	38	3	1	0	1	0	40	3	3	0
9	FW	(England) Andy Hunt	32+2	6	1	0	2	0	35+2	6	3	0
10	FW	(England) Clive Mendonca	19+6	8	0	0	3	0	22+6	8	11	1
11	MF	(Wales) John Robinson	27+3	3	1	0	3	0	31+3	3	9	0
12	DF	(England) Steve Brown	13+5	0	0	0	0+2	0	13+7	0	3	0
13	GK	(Australia) Andy Petterson	7+3	0	0	0	1	0	8+3	0	0	1
14	DF	(Wales) Mark Bowen	2+4	0	0	0	0	0	2+4	0	0	0
15	MF	(England) Keith Jones	13+9	1	0	0	3	0	16+9	1	1	1
16	MF	(England) Paul Mortimer	10+7	1	0	0	2+1	1	12+8	2	2	0
17	FW	(England) Mark Bright	1+4	1	0+1	0	0+1	0	1+6	1	0	0
18	MF	(England) Matty Holmes	0	0	0+1	0	0	0	0+1	0	0	0
19	FW	(England) Steve Jones	7+19	1	0	0	1+1	0	8+20	1	4	0
20	DF	(England) Anthony Barness	0+3	0	0	0	0	0	0+3	0	0	0
22	FW	(Jamaica) Kevin Lisbie	0+1	0	0	0	0+1	0	0+2	0	0	0
23	DF	(England) Carl Tiler	27	1	1	0	0	0	28	1	5	0
26	DF	(England) Paul Konchesky	1+1	0	0	0	0	0	1+1	0	0	0
27	MF	(England) Scott Parker	0+4	0	1	0	0+1	0	1+5	0	1	0
28	GK	(England) Simon Royce	8	0	0	0	0	0	8	0	0	0
29	FW	(England) Bradley Allen	0	0	0	0	0+1	0	0+1	0	0	0
37	MF	(England) John Barnes	2+10	0	0	0	0	0	2+10	0	0	0
39	FW	(Sweden) Martin Pringle	15+3	3	0	0	0	0	15+3	3	1	0
40	MF	(England) Graham Stuart	9	3	0	0	0	0	9	3	0	0

=== Starting 11 ===
Considering starts in all competitions

- GK: #1, (Federal Republic of Yugoslavia) Saša Ilić, 26
- RB: #2, (England) Danny Mills, 40
- CB: #5, (England) Richard Rufus, 31
- CB: #23, (England) Carl Tiler, 28
- LB: #3, (England) Chris Powell, 42
- RM: #4, (England) Neil Redfearn, 32
- CM: #8, (Republic of Ireland) Mark Kinsella, 40
- CM: #15, (England) Keith Jones, 16 (#6, (England) Eddie Youds has 25 starts as a central defender)
- LM: #11, (Wales) John Robinson, 31
- CF: #9, (England) Andy Hunt, 35
- CF: #10, (England) Clive Mendonca, 22
