= 2001–02 Charlton Athletic F.C. season =

Charlton Athletic
2001–02 season
- Chairman: Richard Murray
- Manager: Alan Curbishley
- Stadium: The Valley
- FA Premier League: 14th
- FA Cup: Fourth round
- League Cup: Fourth round
- Top goalscorer: League: Jason Euell (11); All: Jason Euell (13)
- Highest home attendance: 26,614 (vs. Sunderland, 27 April)
- Lowest home attendance: 7,247 (vs. Port Vale, 12 September)
- Average home league attendance: 24,165
| Home colours | Away colours | Third colours |

During the 2001–02 English football season, Charlton Athletic competed in the FA Premier League. The club also competed in the FA Cup, and the League Cup.

== Season summary ==
Despite being without several key players for long periods of time due to injury, Charlton did well in their 11th season under the management of Alan Curbishley. They were in with a real chance of UEFA Cup qualification as late as March, but a failure to win any of their final eight league games dragged them down to 14th.

Dependable centre back Richard Rufus now began to suffer a series of injury setbacks, missing half of the season.

== Kit ==
Charlton's kit was manufactured by Le Coq Sportif and sponsored by Redbus.

=== Legend ===
| Win | Draw | Loss |

=== FA Premier League ===
| Date | Opponent | Venue | Result | Attendance | Scorers |
|---|---|---|---|---|---|
| 18 August 2001 | Everton | H | 1–2 | 20,451 | Johansson |
| 25 August 2001 | Ipswich Town | A | 1–0 | 22,804 | Lisbie |
| 9 September 2001 | Fulham | H | 1–1 | 20,451 | Melville (own goal) |
| 16 September 2001 | Leeds United | H | 0–2 | 20,451 | |
| 22 September 2001 | Sunderland | A | 2–2 | 46,825 | Quinn (own goal), Brown |
| 29 September 2001 | Leicester City | H | 2–0 | 20,451 | Johansson, Bartlett |
| 13 October 2001 | Middlesbrough | H | 0–0 | 20,451 | |
| 20 October 2001 | Derby County | A | 1–1 | 30,221 | Euell |
| 24 October 2001 | Aston Villa | A | 0–1 | 27,701 | |
| 27 October 2001 | Liverpool | H | 0–2 | 22,887 | |
| 4 November 2001 | Arsenal | A | 4–2 | 38,010 | Brown, Wright (own goal), Jensen, Euell |
| 19 November 2001 | West Ham United | H | 4–4 | 23,198 | Euell (2), Johansson (2) |
| 24 November 2001 | Southampton | A | 0–1 | 31,198 | |
| 1 December 2001 | Newcastle United | H | 1–1 | 24,151 | MacDonald |
| 5 December 2001 | Chelsea | A | 1–0 | 33,504 | Lisbie |
| 8 December 2001 | Tottenham Hotspur | H | 3–1 | 25,125 | Stuart, Lisbie (2) |
| 15 December 2001 | Bolton Wanderers | A | 0–0 | 20,834 | |
| 22 December 2001 | Blackburn Rovers | H | 0–2 | 25,857 | |
| 26 December 2001 | Fulham | A | 0–0 | 17,900 | |
| 29 December 2001 | Everton | A | 3–0 | 31,131 | Stuart, Euell, Konchesky |
| 1 January 2002 | Ipswich Town | H | 3–2 | 25,893 | Robinson, Parker, Euell |
| 12 January 2002 | Blackburn Rovers | A | 1–4 | 23,365 | Euell |
| 21 January 2002 | Aston Villa | H | 1–2 | 25,681 | Stuart |
| 29 January 2002 | Derby County | H | 1–0 | 25,387 | Bart-Williams |
| 3 February 2002 | Middlesbrough | A | 0–0 | 24,189 | |
| 10 February 2002 | Manchester United | H | 0–2 | 26,475 | |
| 24 February 2002 | Leeds United | A | 0–0 | 39,374 | |
| 2 March 2002 | Chelsea | H | 2–1 | 26,354 | Euell (2) |
| 9 March 2002 | Leicester City | A | 1–1 | 18,562 | Euell |
| 18 March 2002 | Tottenham Hotspur | A | 1–0 | 29,602 | Powell |
| 23 March 2002 | Bolton Wanderers | H | 1–2 | 26,358 | Johansson |
| 30 March 2002 | Liverpool | A | 0–2 | 44,094 | |
| 1 April 2002 | Arsenal | H | 0–3 | 26,339 | |
| 6 April 2002 | West Ham United | A | 0–2 | 32,389 | |
| 13 April 2002 | Southampton | H | 1–1 | 26,557 | Rufus |
| 20 April 2002 | Newcastle United | A | 0–3 | 51,360 | |
| 27 April 2002 | Sunderland | H | 2–2 | 26,614 | Euell, Lisbie |
| 11 May 2002 | Manchester United | A | 0–0 | 67,571 | |

=== FA Cup ===
| Round | Date | Opponent | Venue | Result | Attendance | Goalscorers |
|---|---|---|---|---|---|---|
| R3 | 5 January 2002 | Blackpool | H | 2–1 | 17,525 | Stuart (pen), Euell |
| R4 | 26 January 2002 | Walsall | H | 1–2 | 18,573 | Stuart |

=== League Cup ===
| Round | Date | Opponent | Venue | Result | Attendance | Goalscorers |
|---|---|---|---|---|---|---|
| R2 | 12 September 2001 | Port Vale | H | 2–0 | 7,247 | Fortune, Konchesky |
| R3 | 9 October 2001 | West Bromwich Albion | A | 1–0 | 17,734 | Euell (pen) |
| R4 | 27 November 2001 | Watford | A | 2–3 (a.e.t.) | 12,621 | Brown, Robinson |

== Players ==
=== First-team squad ===
Squad at end of season

Note: Flags indicate national team as defined under FIFA eligibility rules; some limited exceptions apply. Players may hold more than one non-FIFA nationality.

| No. | Pos. | Nation | Player |
|---|---|---|---|
| 1 | GK | IRL | Dean Kiely (Note: Kiely was born in Salford, England, and represented them at U-15, U-16, and U-18 level, but also qualified to represent the Republic of Ireland internationally and made his international debut for the Republic of Ireland in November 1999.) |
| 2 | DF | BUL | Radostin Kishishev |
| 3 | DF | ENG | Chris Powell |
| 4 | MF | ENG | Graham Stuart |
| 5 | DF | ENG | Richard Rufus |
| 6 | DF | ENG | Andy Todd |
| 7 | DF | ENG | Chris Bart-Williams (Note: Bart-Williams was born in Freetown, Sierra Leone, but was raised in England and represented them at U-21 and B level.) |
| 8 | MF | IRL | Mark Kinsella (captain) |
| 9 | FW | ENG | Jason Euell (Note: Euell was born in Lambeth, England, and represented them at U-21 level, but also qualified to represent Jamaica internationally through his father and would make his international debut for Jamaica in November 2004.) |
| 11 | MF | WAL | John Robinson (Note: Robinson was born in Bulawayo, Rhodesia (now Zimbabwe), but also qualified to represent Wales internationally and represented them at U-21 level before making his international debut for Wales in 1995.) |
| 12 | DF | ENG | Steve Brown |
| 13 | GK | YUG | Saša Ilić (Note: Ilić was born in Melbourne, Australia, but also qualified to represent FR Yugoslavia internationally and made his international debut for FR Yugoslavia in December 1998.) |
| 14 | FW | SWE | Martin Pringle |
| 15 | DF | ENG | Eddie Youds |
| 16 | DF | SCO | Greg Shields |

| No. | Pos. | Nation | Player |
|---|---|---|---|
| 17 | MF | ENG | Scott Parker |
| 18 | DF | ENG | Paul Konchesky |
| 19 | DF | ENG | Luke Young |
| 20 | MF | DEN | Claus Jensen |
| 21 | FW | FIN | Jonatan Johansson |
| 22 | GK | ENG | Ben Roberts |
| 24 | DF | ENG | Jonathan Fortune |
| 26 | FW | SWE | Mathias Svensson |
| 27 | DF | POR | Jorge Costa (on loan from Porto) |
| 29 | FW | JAM | Kevin Lisbie (Note: Lisbie was born in Hackney, England, but also qualified to represent Jamaica internationally and made his international debut for Jamaica in 2002.) |
| 30 | FW | ENG | Charlie MacDonald |
| 33 | MF | ENG | David Collis |
| 36 | DF | RSA | Mark Fish |
| 37 | FW | RSA | Shaun Bartlett |

=== Left club during season ===
Note: Flags indicate national team as defined under FIFA eligibility rules; some limited exceptions apply. Players may hold more than one non-FIFA nationality.

| No. | Pos. | Nation | Player |
|---|---|---|---|
| 7 | MF | ENG | Shaun Newton (to Wolverhampton Wanderers) |
| 10 | FW | ENG | Clive Mendonca (retired) |
| 23 | MF | ENG | Gavin Peacock (on loan from Queens Park Rangers) |

| No. | Pos. | Nation | Player |
|---|---|---|---|
| 28 | MF | ENG | John Salako (Note: Salako was born in Ibadan, Nigeria, but also qualified to represent England internationally and made his international debut for England in 1991.) (to Reading) |
| 32 | DF | NGR | Danny Shittu (to Queens Park Rangers) |

=== Reserve squad ===
Note: Flags indicate national team as defined under FIFA eligibility rules; some limited exceptions apply. Players may hold more than one non-FIFA nationality.

| No. | Pos. | Nation | Player |
|---|---|---|---|
| — | GK | ENG | Martin Brennan |
| — | DF | ENG | Barry Fuller |
| — | DF | ENG | Paul Robson |
| — | DF | ENG | Osei Sankofa |
| — | DF | ENG | Michael Turner |

| No. | Pos. | Nation | Player |
|---|---|---|---|
| — | MF | JAM | Jamal Campbell-Ryce (Note: Campbell-Ryce was born in Lambeth, England, but also qualified to represent Jamaica internationally and would make his international debut for Jamaica in 2003.) |
| — | MF | ENG | Stacy Long |
| — | MF | ENG | Lloyd Sam (Note: Sam was born in Leeds, England, and represented them at U-20 level, but also qualified to represent Ghana internationally through his parents and would make his international debut for Ghana in October 2015.) |
| — | MF | IRL | Neil McCafferty |
| — | FW | ENG | Mark DeBolla |

== Statistics ==
=== Appearances, goals and cards ===
(Starting appearances + substitute appearances)

| No. | Pos. | Name | League | | FA Cup | | League Cup | | Total | | Discipline | |
| No. | Pos. | Name | Apps | Goals | Apps | Goals | Apps | Goals | Apps | Goals | Yellow card | Red card |
|---|---|---|---|---|---|---|---|---|---|---|---|---|
| 1 | GK | (Republic of Ireland) Dean Kiely | 38 | 0 | 2 | 0 | 3 | 0 | 43 | 0 | 2 | 0 |
| 2 | DF | (Bulgaria) Radostin Kishishev | 0+3 | 0 | 0+1 | 0 | 0 | 0 | 0+4 | 0 | 0 | 0 |
| 3 | DF | (England) Chris Powell | 35+1 | 1 | 2 | 0 | 3 | 0 | 40+1 | 1 | 2 | 0 |
| 4 | MF | (England) Graham Stuart | 31 | 3 | 2 | 2 | 2 | 0 | 35 | 5 | 3 | 1 |
| 5 | DF | (England) Richard Rufus | 10 | 1 | 0 | 0 | 0 | 0 | 10 | 1 | 1 | 0 |
| 6 | DF | (England) Andy Todd | 3+2 | 0 | 0 | 0 | 2 | 0 | 5+2 | 0 | 2 | 0 |
| 7 | DF | (England) Chris Bart-Williams | 10+6 | 1 | 2 | 0 | 0 | 0 | 12+6 | 1 | 2 | 0 |
| 8 | MF | (Republic of Ireland) Mark Kinsella | 14+3 | 0 | 0 | 0 | 1 | 0 | 15+3 | 0 | 2 | 0 |
| 9 | FW | (England) Jason Euell | 31+5 | 11 | 2 | 1 | 2 | 1 | 35+5 | 13 | 5 | 0 |
| 11 | MF | (Wales) John Robinson | 16+12 | 1 | 2 | 0 | 3 | 1 | 21+12 | 2 | 5 | 0 |
| 12 | DF | (England) Steve Brown | 11+3 | 2 | 1+1 | 0 | 2+1 | 1 | 14+5 | 3 | 3 | 1 |
| 17 | MF | (England) Scott Parker | 36+2 | 1 | 0 | 0 | 3 | 0 | 39+2 | 1 | 8 | 1 |
| 18 | DF | (England) Paul Konchesky | 22+12 | 1 | 2 | 0 | 0+3 | 1 | 24+15 | 2 | 4 | 0 |
| 19 | DF | (England) Luke Young | 34 | 0 | 1 | 0 | 3 | 0 | 38 | 0 | 6 | 0 |
| 20 | MF | (Denmark) Claus Jensen | 16+2 | 1 | 0 | 0 | 2 | 0 | 18+2 | 1 | 0 | 0 |
| 21 | FW | (Finland) Jonatan Johansson | 21+9 | 5 | 1+1 | 0 | 2 | 0 | 24+10 | 5 | 2 | 0 |
| 23 | MF | (England) Gavin Peacock | 1+4 | 0 | 0 | 0 | 0 | 0 | 1+4 | 0 | 0 | 0 |
| 24 | DF | (England) Jonathan Fortune | 14+5 | 0 | 2 | 0 | 2 | 1 | 18+5 | 1 | 3 | 0 |
| 26 | FW | (Sweden) Mathias Svensson | 6+6 | 0 | 0+1 | 0 | 0 | 0 | 6+7 | 0 | 2 | 0 |
| 27 | DF | (Portugal) Jorge Costa | 22+2 | 0 | 2 | 0 | 0 | 0 | 24+2 | 0 | 9 | 0 |
| 28 | MF | (England) John Salako | 2+1 | 0 | 0 | 0 | 0+1 | 0 | 2+2 | 0 | 0 | 0 |
| 29 | FW | (Jamaica) Kevin Lisbie | 10+12 | 5 | 1+1 | 0 | 0+2 | 0 | 11+15 | 5 | 2 | 0 |
| 30 | FW | (England) Charlie MacDonald | 0+2 | 1 | 0 | 0 | 0+1 | 0 | 0+3 | 1 | 0 | 0 |
| 36 | DF | (South Africa) Mark Fish | 25 | 0 | 0 | 0 | 1 | 0 | 26 | 0 | 3 | 0 |
| 37 | FW | (South Africa) Shaun Bartlett | 10+4 | 1 | 0+1 | 0 | 2 | 0 | 12+5 | 1 | 2 | 0 |

== Transfers ==
=== In ===
| Date | Pos | Name | From | Fee |
|---|---|---|---|---|
| 22 May 2001 | FW | (South Africa) Shaun Bartlett | FC Zürich | £2,000,000 |
| 4 July 2001 | FW | (England) Jason Euell | Wimbledon | £4,750,000 |
| 25 July 2001 | DF | (England) Luke Young | Tottenham Hotspur | £3,000,000 |
| 3 December 2001 | MF | (England) Chris Bart-Williams | Nottingham Forest | Free |

=== Out ===
| Date | Pos | Name | To | Fee |
|---|---|---|---|---|
| 1 June 2001 | MF | (Iran) Karim Bagheri | Al-Sadd | Free |
| 27 July 2001 | GK | (England) Tony Caig | Hibernian | Free |
| 30 July 2001 | MF | (England) Anthony Allman | Colchester United | Free |
| 7 August 2001 | MF | (England) Shaun Newton | Wolverhampton Wanderers | £850,000 |
| 7 January 2002 | DF | (Nigeria) Danny Shittu | Queens Park Rangers | £350,000 |
| 26 January 2002 | MF | (England) John Salako | Reading | £50,000 |
| 1 February 2002 | FW | (England) Clive Mendonca | Retired | |

Transfers in: ▼£9,750,000
Transfers out: ▲£1,250,000
Total spending: ▼£8,500,000

=== Loan in ===
| Date | Pos | Name | Club | Return | Ref |
|---|---|---|---|---|---|
| 7 August 2001 | MF | (England) Gavin Peacock | Queens Park Rangers | 7 December 2001 | |
| 3 December 2001 | DF | (Portugal) Jorge Costa | FC Porto | 11 May 2002 | |

=== Loan out ===
| Date | Pos | Name | Club | Return | Ref |
|---|---|---|---|---|---|
| 7 September 2001 | GK | (Federal Republic of Yugoslavia) Saša Ilić | Portsmouth | 7 October 2001 | |
| 17 January 2002 | GK | (England) Ben Roberts | Reading | 17 February 2002 | |
| 18 February 2002 | DF | (Scotland) Greg Shields | Walsall | 18 March 2002 | |
| 21 February 2002 | FW | (Sweden) Martin Pringle | Grimsby Town | 27 February 2002 | |
| 21 February 2002 | DF | (England) Andy Todd | Grimsby Town | 22 April 2002 | |
