= 1996–97 Charlton Athletic F.C. season =

Charlton Athletic
1996–97 season
- Chairman: Richard Murray
- Manager: Alan Curbishley
- Stadium: The Valley
- Football League First Division: 15th
- FA Cup: Third round
- League Cup: Third round
- Top goalscorer: League: Leaburn (8); All: Leaburn/Whyte (9)
- Highest home attendance: 15,301 vs. Barnsley (15 February 1997)
- Lowest home attendance: 8,497 vs. Southend United (10 September 1996)
- Average home league attendance: 11,356
Home colours	Away colours	Third colours

During the 1996–97 English football season, Charlton Athletic F.C. competed in the Football League First Division. The club also competed in the FA Cup, and the League Cup.

== Season summary ==
After missing out on promotion to the Premier League the season before in the play-offs, Alan Curbishley was looking to steer Charlton to automatic promotion the following season but it turned out to be a disappointing season for the Addicks, finishing in 15th place.

== Kit ==
Charlton's kit was manufactured by Quaser and sponsored by Viglen.

== Final league table ==
Pos	Team	Pld	W	D	L	GF	GA	GD	Pts
13	Norwich City	46	17	12	17	63	68	−5	63
14	Manchester City	46	17	10	19	59	60	−1	61
15	Charlton Athletic	46	16	11	19	52	66	−14	59
16	West Bromwich Albion	46	14	15	17	68	72	−4	57
17	Oxford United	46	16	9	21	64	68	−4	57

Rules for classification: 1) Points; 2) Goals scored; 3) Goal difference

== Results ==
Charlton Athletic's score comes first

=== Legend ===
Win	Draw	Loss

=== Football League First Division ===
Date	Opponent	Venue	Result	Attendance	Scorers
17 August 1996	Huddersfield Town	A	0–2	11,858	
24 August 1996	West Bromwich Albion	H	1–1	9,642	Leaburn
3 September 1996	Manchester City	A	1–2	25,963	Newton
6 September 1996	Wolverhampton Wanderers	A	0–1	21,072	
10 September 1996	Southend United	H	2–0	8,497	Stuart, Mortimer
14 September 1996	Reading	H	1–0	10,831	Leaburn
20 September 1996	Ipswich Town	A	1–2	10,558	Allen
28 September 1996	Oldham Athletic	H	1–0	12,178	Whyte
12 October 1996	Portsmouth	A	0–2	6,641	
15 October 1996	Sheffield United	A	0–3	14,080	
19 October 1996	Bolton Wanderers	H	3–3	11,091	Whyte (2), Chapple
26 October 1996	Oxford United	H	2–0	10,626	Kinsella, Leaburn
29 October 1996	Tranmere Rovers	A	0–4	5,527	
2 November 1996	Norwich City	A	2–1	14,145	Allen, Kinsella
16 November 1996	Queens Park Rangers	A	2–1	12,360	Poole, Allen
20 November 1996	Birmingham City	H	2–1	8,574	Allen, O'Connell
23 November 1996	Bradford City	H	0–2	12,256	
26 November 1996	Grimsby Town	H	1–3	14,412	Whyte
30 November 1996	Oxford United	A	2–0	7,080	Barness, Whyte
4 December 1996	Stoke City	A	0–1	7,456	
7 December 1996	Swindon Town	H	2–0	10,565	Leaburn, Whyte
14 December 1996	Port Vale	H	1–3	10,003	Chapple
21 December 1996	Crystal Palace	A	0–1	16,279	
26 December 1996	Southend United	A	2–0	7,508	Kinsella, Robinson
28 December 1996	Wolverhampton Wanderers	H	0–0	12,259	
1 January 1997	Ipswich Town	H	1–1	10,186	Robson
11 January 1997	Reading	A	2–2	7,614	Lisbie, Whyte
18 January 1997	Stoke City	H	1–2	9,901	Barness
1 February 1997	Grimsby Town	A	0–2	4,139	
7 February 1997	Tranmere Rovers	H	3–1	11,283	Kinsella, Leaburn, Robson (pen)
15 February 1997	Barnsley	H	2–2	15,301	Nicholls, Lee
22 February 1997	Norwich City	H	4–4	12,405	Kinsella, Robson, Lee, Leaburn
1 March 1997	Swindon Town	A	0–1	9,256	
4 March 1997	Queens Park Rangers	H	2–1	10,610	Leaburn, Balmer
8 March 1997	Crystal Palace	H	2–1	15,000	Lee, Robinson
15 March 1997	Port Vale	A	0–2	5,905	
18 March 1997	Oldham Athletic	A	1–1	4,969	O'Connell
22 March 1997	West Bromwich Albion	A	2–1	17,378	Robinson, Balmer
31 March 1997	Birmingham City	A	0–0	14,525	
5 April 1997	Manchester City	H	1–1	15,000	Leaburn
9 April 1997	Huddersfield Town	H	2–1	11,032	Newton (2)
12 April 1997	Barnsley	A	0–4	11,701	
19 April 1997	Portsmouth	H	2–1	12,342	Bright (2)
25 April 1997	Bolton Wanderers	A	1–4	21,880	Kinsella
1 May 1997	Bradford City	A	0–1	15,780	
4 May 1997	Sheffield United	H	0–0	12,589	

=== FA Cup ===
Round	Date	Opponent	Venue	Result	Attendance	Goalscorers
R3	5 January 1997	Newcastle United	H	1–1	15,000	Kinsella
R3R	15 January 1997	Newcastle United	A	1–2	36,398	Robson

=== League Cup ===
Round	Date	Opponent	Venue	Result	Attendance	Goalscorers
R2 First Leg	17 September 1996	Burnley	H	4–1	4,874	Leaburn, Robinson (2), Allen
R2 Second Leg	24 September 1996	Burnley	A	2–1 (won 6–2 on agg)	2,281	Allen, Whyte
R3	23 October 1996	Liverpool	H	1–1	15,000	Whyte
R3R	13 November 1996	Liverpool	A	1–4	20,714	Newton

== First-team squad ==
Squad at end of season

Note: Flags indicate national team as defined under FIFA eligibility rules; some limited exceptions apply. Players may hold more than one non-FIFA nationality.

No.	Pos.	Nation	Player
—	GK	ENG	Mike Salmon
—	GK	AUS	Andy Petterson
—	DF	ENG	Anthony Barness
—	DF	ENG	Steve Brown
—	DF	ENG	Dean Chandler
—	DF	ENG	Phil Chapple
—	DF	ENG	Gary Poole
—	DF	ENG	Richard Rufus
—	DF	ENG	Kevin Scott (on loan from Tottenham Hotspur)
—	DF	ENG	Jamie Stuart
—	DF	ENG	Paul Sturgess
—	DF	SCO	Stuart Balmer
—	MF	ENG	Keith Jones
—	MF	ENG	Paul Mortimer

No.	Pos.	Nation	Player
—	MF	ENG	Shaun Newton
—	MF	ENG	Kevin Nicholls
—	MF	ENG	Brendan O'Connell
—	MF	ENG	Ricky Otto (on loan from Birmingham City)
—	MF	ENG	Mark Robson
—	MF	WAL	John Robinson (Note: Robinson was born in Bulawayo, Rhodesia (now Zimbabwe), but also qualified to represent Wales internationally and represented them at U-21 level before making his international debut for Wales in 1995.)
—	MF	IRL	Mark Kinsella
—	FW	ENG	Bradley Allen
—	FW	ENG	Mark Bright
—	FW	ENG	Steve Jones
—	FW	ENG	Carl Leaburn
—	FW	ENG	Jason Lee (on loan from Nottingham Forest)
—	FW	ENG	Kevin Lisbie (Note: Lisbie was born in Hackney, England, but also qualified to represent Jamaica internationally and would make his international debut for Jamaica in 2002.)
—	FW	ENG	David Whyte
