= 1999–2000 Charlton Athletic F.C. season =

Charlton Athletic
1999–2000 season
- Chairman: Richard Murray
- Manager: Alan Curbishley
- Stadium: The Valley
- First Division: 1st (promoted)
- FA Cup: Sixth round
- Worthington Cup: Second round
- Top goalscorer: League: Hunt (24); All: Hunt (25)
- Lowest home attendance: 18,663 Walsall (6 November 1999)
- Average home league attendance: 19,558
| Home colours | Away colours |

During the 1999–2000 English football season, Charlton Athletic F.C. competed in the Football League First Division. The club also competed in the FA Cup, and the League Cup.

== Season summary ==
Alan Curbishley and his Charlton side won the First Division title to regain promotion to the FA Carling Premiership for the 2000–2001 season at the first time of asking.

A key player in the previous season's unsuccessful bid to avoid relegation, Richard Rufus, remained with the club and enjoyed a very productive season scoring six goals and helping Charlton to win the First Division title.

== Kit ==
Charlton's kit was manufactured by Le Coq Sportif and sponsored by Mesh Computers.

== Final league table ==
| Pos | Team | Pld | W | D | L | GF | GA | GD | Pts | Qualification or relegation |
|---|---|---|---|---|---|---|---|---|---|---|
| 1 | Charlton Athletic (C, P) | 46 | 27 | 10 | 9 | 79 | 45 | +34 | 91 | Promotion to the Premier League |
| 2 | Manchester City (P) | 46 | 26 | 11 | 9 | 78 | 40 | +38 | 89 | Promotion to the Premier League |
| 3 | Ipswich Town (O, P) | 46 | 25 | 12 | 9 | 71 | 42 | +29 | 87 | Qualification for the First Division play-offs |
| 4 | Barnsley | 46 | 24 | 10 | 12 | 88 | 67 | +21 | 82 | Qualification for the First Division play-offs |
| 5 | Birmingham City | 46 | 22 | 11 | 13 | 65 | 44 | +21 | 77 | Qualification for the First Division play-offs |

Rules for classification: 1) Points; 2) Goal difference; 3) Goals scored
(C) Champions; (O) Play-off winners; (P) Promoted

== Results ==
Charlton Athletic's score comes first

=== Legend ===
| Win | Draw | Loss |

=== Football League First Division ===
| Matchday | 1 | 2 | 3 | 4 | 5 | 6 | 7 | 8 | 9 | 10 | 11 | 12 | 13 | 14 | 15 | 16 | 17 | 18 | 19 | 20 | 21 | 22 | 23 | 24 | 25 | 26 | 27 | 28 | 29 | 30 | 31 | 32 | 33 | 34 | 35 | 36 | 37 | 38 | 39 | 40 | 41 | 42 | 43 | 44 | 45 | 46 |
|---|---|---|---|---|---|---|---|---|---|---|---|---|---|---|---|---|---|---|---|---|---|---|---|---|---|---|---|---|---|---|---|---|---|---|---|---|---|---|---|---|---|---|---|---|---|---|
| Ground | H | H | A | H | A | A | H | H | A | A | H | H | A | A | H | A | A | H | A | H | H | A | A | H | A | H | H | A | A | H | H | H | A | A | H | A | H | A | H | A | A | H | H | A | H | A |
| Result | W | W | L | W | W | D | W | W | W | L | D | W | L | W | W | W | W | L | W | W | W | D | D | W | W | W | W | W | W | W | W | W | W | W | L | D | W | W | W | D | D | L | D | D | L | L |
| Position | 1 | 4 | 9 | 11 | 8 | 9 | 5 | 2 | 6 | 9 | 9 | 8 | 9 | 6 | 3 | 2 | 2 | 2 | 2 | 2 | 2 | 2 | 3 | 3 | 2 | 1 | 1 | 1 | 1 | 1 | 1 | 1 | 1 | 1 | 1 | 1 | 1 | 1 | 1 | 1 | 1 | 1 | 1 | 1 | 1 | 1 |

Source: WorldFootball.com
A = Away; H = Home; W = Win; D = Draw; L = Loss

| Date | Opponent | Venue | Result | Attendance | Scorers |
|---|---|---|---|---|---|
| 7 August 1999 | Barnsley | H | 3-1 | 19,268 | Mendonca (3, 2 pens) |
| 21 August 1999 | Norwich City | H | 1-0 | 19,623 | Rufus |
| 28 August 1999 | Fulham | A | 1-2 | 15,154 | Melville (own goal) |
| 11 September 1999 | Bolton Wanderers | H | 2-1 | 19,028 | Stuart, Mendonca |
| 18 September 1999 | Sheffield United | A | 2-1 | 13,216 | Hunt (2) |
| 25 September 1999 | Tranmere Rovers | A | 2-2 | 5,846 | Mendonca (pen), Kinsella |
| 28 September 1999 | Stockport County | H | 4-0 | 19,842 | Hunt (3), Mendonca (pen) |
| 2 October 1999 | Birmingham City | H | 1-0 | 19,753 | Shields |
| 16 October 1999 | Portsmouth | A | 2-0 | 14,812 | Robinson, Salako |
| 19 October 1999 | Ipswich Town | A | 2-4 | 17,940 | Hunt (2) |
| 23 October 1999 | West Bromwich Albion | H | 0-0 | 19,346 | |
| 26 October 1999 | Tranmere Rovers | H | 3-2 | 19,491 | Brown, Robinson, Rufus |
| 30 October 1999 | Birmingham City | A | 0-1 | 19,172 | |
| 2 November 1999 | Crewe Alexandra | A | 2-0 | 4,741 | Stuart, Pringle |
| 6 November 1999 | Walsall | H | 2-1 | 18,663 | Hunt, Stuart |
| 12 November 1999 | Grimsby Town | A | 5-2 | 6,849 | Rufus (2), Mendonca, Hunt, Groves (own goal) |
| 20 November 1999 | Manchester City | H | 0-1 | 20,043 | |
| 23 November 1999 | Swindon Town | A | 2-1 | 6,515 | Robinson, Newton |
| 27 November 1999 | Port Vale | H | 2-2 | 19,266 | Mendonca (2) |
| 30 November 1999 | Blackburn Rovers | H | 1-2 | 18,939 | Newton |
| 4 December 1999 | Barnsley | A | 1-1 | 14,553 | Jones |
| 18 December 1999 | Queens Park Rangers | A | 0-0 | 14,709 | |
| 26 December 1999 | Crystal Palace | H | 2-1 | 20,043 | Salako, Pringle |
| 28 December 1999 | Huddersfield Town | A | 2-1 | 17,415 | Hunt, Robinson |
| 3 January 2000 | Nottingham Forest | H | 3-0 | 19,787 | Shields, Stuart, Hunt |
| 11 January 2000 | Wolverhampton Wanderers | A | 3-2 | 18,464 | Rufus, Pringle, Robinson |
| 15 January 2000 | Crewe Alexandra | H | 1-0 | 19,125 | Stuart |
| 22 January 2000 | Norwich City | A | 3-0 | 15,642 | Hunt (3) |
| 5 February 2000 | Stockport County | A | 3-1 | 8,185 | Hunt (3) |
| 12 February 2000 | Wolverhampton Wanderers | H | 2-0 | 20,043 | Stuart, Brown |
| 15 February 2000 | Fulham | H | 1-0 | 19,940 | Robinson |
| 26 February 2000 | Sheffield United | H | 1-0 | 19,249 | Robinson |
| 4 March 2000 | Bolton Wanderers | A | 2-0 | 15,000 | Pringle, Hunt |
| 7 March 2000 | Walsall | A | 4-2 | 6,227 | Hunt (2), Kinsella (2) |
| 11 March 2000 | Swindon Town | H | 0-1 | 19,569 | |
| 19 March 2000 | Manchester City | A | 1-1 | 32,139 | Robinson |
| 22 March 2000 | Grimsby Town | H | 4-0 | 19,364 | Newton, Svensson, Hunt, Tiler |
| 25 March 2000 | Crystal Palace | A | 1-0 | 22,577 | Kitson |
| 31 March 2000 | Queens Park Rangers | H | 2-1 | 19,617 | Newton, Parker |
| 4 April 2000 | Port Vale | A | 2-2 | 4,513 | Rufus, Hunt |
| 8 April 2000 | Nottingham Forest | A | 1-1 | 20,922 | Hunt |
| 14 April 2000 | Huddersfield Town | H | 0-1 | 19,739 | |
| 21 April 2000 | Portsmouth | H | 1-1 | 20,043 | Stuart |
| 24 April 2000 | Blackburn Rovers | A | 1-1 | 18,587 | Svensson |
| 29 April 2000 | Ipswich Town | H | 1-3 | 20,043 | Hunt |
| 7 May 2000 | West Bromwich Albion | A | 0-2 | 22,101 | |

=== FA Cup ===
| Round | Date | Opponent | Venue | Result | Attendance | Goalscorers |
|---|---|---|---|---|---|---|
| R3 | 11 December 1999 | Swindon Town | H | 2-1 | 10,939 | Kinsella (2) |
| R4 | 8 January 2000 | Queens Park Rangers | H | 1-0 | 16,798 | MacDonald |
| R5 | 29 January 2000 | Coventry City | A | 3-2 | 23,400 | Robinson, Newton, Hunt |
| QF | 19 February 2000 | Bolton Wanderers | A | 0-1 | 20,131 | |

=== League Cup ===
| Round | Date | Opponent | Venue | Result | Attendance | Goalscorers |
|---|---|---|---|---|---|---|
| R2 1st Leg | 14 September 1999 | Bournemouth | H | 0-0 | 10,346 | |
| R2 2nd Leg | 21 September 1999 | Bournemouth | A | 0-0 (lost 1-3 on pens) | 4,369 | |

== First-team squad ==
Squad at end of season

Note: Flags indicate national team as defined under FIFA eligibility rules; some limited exceptions apply. Players may hold more than one non-FIFA nationality.

| No. | Pos. | Nation | Player |
|---|---|---|---|
| 1 | GK | IRL | Dean Kiely (Note: Kiely was born in Salford, England, and represented them at U-15, U-16, and U-18 level, but also qualified to represent the Republic of Ireland internationally and made his international debut for the Republic of Ireland in November 1999.) |
| 2 | DF | ENG | Anthony Barness |
| 3 | DF | ENG | Chris Powell |
| 4 | MF | ENG | Graham Stuart |
| 5 | DF | ENG | Richard Rufus |
| 6 | DF | ENG | Carl Tiler |
| 7 | MF | ENG | Shaun Newton |
| 8 | MF | IRL | Mark Kinsella |
| 9 | FW | ENG | Andy Hunt |
| 10 | FW | ENG | Clive Mendonca |
| 11 | MF | WAL | John Robinson (Note: Robinson was born in Bulawayo, Rhodesia (now Zimbabwe), but also qualified to represent Wales internationally and represented them at U-21 level before making his international debut for Wales in 1995.) |
| 12 | DF | ENG | Steve Brown |
| 13 | GK | YUG | Sasa Ilic (Note: Ilić was born in Melbourne, Australia, but also qualified to represent FR Yugoslavia internationally and made his international debut for FR Yugoslavia in December 1998.) |
| 14 | FW | SWE | Martin Pringle |
| 15 | DF | ENG | Eddie Youds |
| 16 | DF | SCO | Greg Shields |
| 17 | MF | ENG | Scott Parker |

| No. | Pos. | Nation | Player |
|---|---|---|---|
| 18 | DF | ENG | Paul Konchesky |
| 19 | DF | ENG | Andy Todd |
| 20 | MF | ENG | Keith Jones |
| 22 | GK | ENG | Simon Royce |
| 23 | DF | ENG | Anthony Allman |
| 24 | DF | ENG | Jonathan Fortune |
| 25 | FW | ENG | Leigh Hales |
| 27 | MF | ENG | Kemal Izzet |
| 28 | MF | ENG | Kevin James |
| 29 | FW | ENG | Kevin Lisbie (Note: Lisbie was born in Hackney, England, but also qualified to represent Jamaica internationally and would make his international debut for Jamaica in 2002.) |
| 30 | FW | ENG | Charlie MacDonald |
| 31 | FW | ENG | Mark McCammon (Note: McCammon was born in Barnet, England, but also qualified to represent Barbados internationally and would make his international debut for Barbados in 2006.) |
| 32 | GK | WAL | Sam Turner |
| 33 | FW | SWE | Mathias Svensson |
| 34 | MF | ENG | John Salako (Note: Salako was born in Ibadan, Nigeria, but also qualified to represent England internationally and made his international debut for England in 1991.) |
| 35 | DF | BEL | Steve Barbé (on loan from Molenbeek) |
| 36 | FW | ENG | Paul Kitson (on loan from West Ham United) |

=== Left club during season ===
Note: Flags indicate national team as defined under FIFA eligibility rules; some limited exceptions apply. Players may hold more than one non-FIFA nationality.

| No. | Pos. | Nation | Player |
|---|---|---|---|
| 19 | FW | ENG | Steve Jones (to Bristol City) |
| 21 | MF | ENG | Matty Holmes (released) |
| 26 | MF | ENG | David Hockley (released) |

| No. | Pos. | Nation | Player |
|---|---|---|---|
| 33 | GK | FIN | Antti Niemi (on loan from Rangers) |
| 33 | DF | ARG | Juan Cobián (to Aberdeen) |
