= Mark Kinsella =

Irish footballer and manager

Personal information
- Full name: Mark Anthony Kinsella
- Date of birth: 12 August 1972 (age 54)
- Place of birth: Dublin, Ireland
- Position: Midfielder

Youth career
- 1988–1989: Home Farm

Senior career*
Years	Team	Apps	(Gls)
1989–1996	Colchester United	180	(27)
1996–2002	Charlton Athletic	208	(20)
2002–2004	Aston Villa	21	(0)
2004	West Bromwich Albion	18	(1)
2004–2006	Walsall	43	(1)
2008	Lewes	1	(0)
Total		471	(49)

International career
1991–1994	Republic of Ireland U21	8	(1)
1998	Republic of Ireland B	1	(0)
1998–2004	Republic of Ireland	48	(3)

Managerial career
- 2006: Walsall (caretaker)
- 2006–2008: Charlton Athletic Reserves
- 2011–2012: Daventry Town
- 2012–2014: Colchester United (assistant)
- 2014–2015: Drogheda United (assistant)
- 2015: Drogheda United
- 2016–2017: Drogheda United (assistant)
- * Club domestic league appearances and goals

Mark Anthony Kinsella (born 12 August 1972) is an Irish football manager and former player, currently a coach at Drogheda United after previously being both the manager and assistant manager. He played as a central midfielder for most of his career.

Kinsella began his career at Colchester United, before spells at Charlton Athletic, Aston Villa, West Bromwich Albion, Walsall and Lewes. He played 48 times for the Republic of Ireland, scoring three goals and playing in the 2002 FIFA World Cup in Japan and South Korea. Kinsella is a former manager of Daventry Town.

== Club career ==
=== Colchester United ===
Kinsella joined Colchester United as a 17-year-old (he was actually signed by the former Rangers manager Jock Wallace) and played there for seven seasons, including two in the Conference, and played at Wembley in 1992 when Colchester won the FA Trophy. He was nicknamed "Sheedy" by the fans, in honour of the Everton player, and is among the club's most revered former players.

=== Charlton Athletic ===
Kinsella moved to Charlton Athletic in September 1996 for £150,000. At Charlton he captained the team to a dramatic victory over Sunderland in the 1998 Division 1 Play-off Final, with Kinsella scoring one of the penalties in the shootout. Following relegation after only one season in the Premier League in 1999, Kinsella lifted the First Division championship trophy with Charlton the following year, with the South East London outfit returning to the top-flight in 2000.

Kinsella is remembered by Charlton fans as a turning point in their recent history, he was the first player in the modern era to stay with Charlton when his performances placed him as a top ten midfielder in the country via the Carling Opta Stats. His skill, talent and sometimes individual carrying of the team in the 1998–99 season places him above that of Richard Rufus, Clive Mendonca, Andy Hunt and John Robinson in Charlton's list of greats in the late 1990s teams. In 2001, he suffered an injury, which allowed Scott Parker to take his place in the team. Kinsella could not reclaim his place in the Charlton first team after coming back from injury, so he was sold to Aston Villa in 2002, for a fee of £1 million.

=== Aston Villa ===
Kinsella made his debut for Aston Villa on 24 August 2002 against Tottenham Hotspur. He later went on to make 24 appearances in his first season. After a good start in the first half of the 2002–03 season he rarely made an appearance in the second half of the season and had a couple injuries that set him back. In Kinsella's second season he only made two appearances and left Aston Villa mid-season in early 2004.

=== West Bromwich Albion ===
Kinsella moved to West Bromwich Albion in January 2004, on a short-term contract until the end of the season. He made 18 appearances for the club, helping them to win promotion to the Premiership. His only goal for Albion came in a 3–0 win over Coventry City on 6 March 2004.

=== Walsall ===
Kinsella then transferred to Walsall in July 2004, signing a two-year deal. After two injury damaged seasons, Kinsella took charge of Walsall on a caretaker basis, following Kevan Broadhurst's sacking in April 2006, earning one win and suffering one defeat in his two games in charge. He continued to combine playing and coaching at Walsall before being lured back to Charlton in December 2006. His last professional match was in Walsall's League Two home defeat to promotion rivals Swindon Town on 9 December 2006. Kinsella scored two goals for Walsall, once against Merthyr Tydfil in the FA Cup, and once against Wycombe Wanderers in the league.

== International career ==
Kinsella won 48 caps for the Irish national team, scoring 3 times and was named Irish Footballer of the Year in 2000. He also captained the side in a friendly against Finland in November 2000. Although rarely remembered, he formed an excellent midfield partnership with Roy Keane in the qualifying stages for the 2002 World Cup. Keane was quoted as stating that Ireland's form during that campaign was down to the presence and performances of Kinsella. After Keane's much publicised dismissal from the squad before the 2002 World Cup, Kinsella formed a solid partnership with future Charlton player Matt Holland.

== Managerial and coaching career ==
While still a player at Walsall, Kinsella took on the additional roles of reserve-team manager and first-team coach. He was appointed development coach at Charlton Athletic in December 2006, with responsibility for the development of young professional players, liaison with the academy and the managing the reserve team. After the appointment of Alan Pardew, Kinsella's role was changed to that of reserve-team manager. It was announced on 10 June 2008 that he has been given a new one-year contract at the club.

In November 2008 when Alan Pardew left Charlton by mutual consent, Kinsella left his post as Reserve team manager, being replaced by U18 Youth Coach Damian Matthew, to adopt a more senior role in the first team, helping Caretaker manager Phil Parkinson, while a replacement for Pardew was found. In December 2008, Parkinson was confirmed as the new Charlton manager, and Kinsella assumed the role of first-team coach permanently. He was sacked along with Phil Parkinson on 4 January 2011. He was linked with return to his former club Colchester United as manager in August 2009, but the job went to Aidy Boothroyd.

He became manager of Daventry Town in June 2011, leaving the club in July 2012. Having left Daventry, Kinsella joined former St Neots Town manager Dennis Greene's coaching staff at Conference North side Histon in August 2012.

Mark was appointed Colchester United assistant manager on 27 September 2012, to work alongside fellow Irishman Joe Dunne.

On 1 September 2014, Mark Kinsella was sacked as assistant manager of Colchester United.

On 29 November 2014, Kinsella was announced as assistant manager of League of Ireland side Drogheda United. Kinsella replaced Johnny McDonnell as manager following McDonnell's departure from the club after a 4–1 home defeat to bottom side Limerick.

On 10 November 2015, Drogheda appointed Pete Mahon as manager and Kinsella stepped back into a coaching role.

On 16 April 2016, the Football Association of Ireland announced that Kinsella, along with former internationals Damien Duff, Kenny Cunningham, Keith Andrews and Stephen McPhail, would help coach some of the Republic of Ireland's youth players. Then on 31 August 2018 Kinsella moved to a specific role with the under-21s team.

== Personal life ==
He is the father of Liam Kinsella and 2020 Olympic bronze medallist Alice Kinsella.

== Career statistics ==
=== Club ===
Appearances and goals by club, season and competition
Club	Season	League			FA Cup		League Cup		Europe		Total	
Club	Season	Division	Apps	Goals	Apps	Goals	Apps	Goals	Apps	Goals	Apps	Goals
Colchester United	1989–90	Fourth Division	6	0	0	0	1	0	–		7	0
Colchester United	1990–91	Conference National	11	0	0	0			–		11	0
Colchester United	1991–92	Conference National	42	3	3	1			–		46	4
Colchester United	1992–93	Third Division	38	6	3	0	2	0	–		43	6
Colchester United	1993–94	Third Division	42	8	1	0	2	1	–		45	9
Colchester United	1994–95	Third Division	42	6	4	1	2	0	–		48	7
Colchester United	1995–96	Third Division	45	5	1	0	2	1	–		48	6
Colchester United	1996–97	Third Division	7	2	0	0	3	1	–		10	3
Charlton Athletic	1996–97	First Division	37	6					–			
Charlton Athletic	1997–98	First Division	46	6					–			
Charlton Athletic	1998–99	Premier League	38	2								
Charlton Athletic	1999–2000	First Division	38	3								
Charlton Athletic	2000–01	Premier League	32	2					–			
Charlton Athletic	2001–02	Premier League	17	0								
Aston Villa	2002–03	Premier League	19	0								
Aston Villa	2003–04	Premier League	1	0								
West Bromwich Albion	2003–04	First Division	18	1								
Walsall	2004–05	League One	22	0					–			
Walsall	2005–06	League One	10	0					–			
Walsall	2006–07	League Two	11	1					–			
Career total			522	51								

=== International ===
Appearances and goals by national team and year
National team	Year	Apps	Goals
Republic of Ireland	1998	5	0
Republic of Ireland	1999	9	0
Republic of Ireland	2000	6	1
Republic of Ireland	2001	5	1
Republic of Ireland	2002	10	1
Republic of Ireland	2003	9	0
Republic of Ireland	2004	4	0
Total		48	3

== Honours ==
Colchester United

- Football Conference: 1991–92
- FA Trophy: 1991–92

Charlton Athletic

- Football League First Division: 1999–2000; play-offs: 1998

Individual

- Colchester United Player of the Year: 1993–94, 1995–96
- PFA Team of the Year: 1995–96 Third Division, 1999–2000 First Division
- Charlton Athletic Player of the Year: 1997–98, 1998–99
- FAI Senior International Player of the Year: 2000
