= Scott Parker =

English footballer and manager (born 1980)

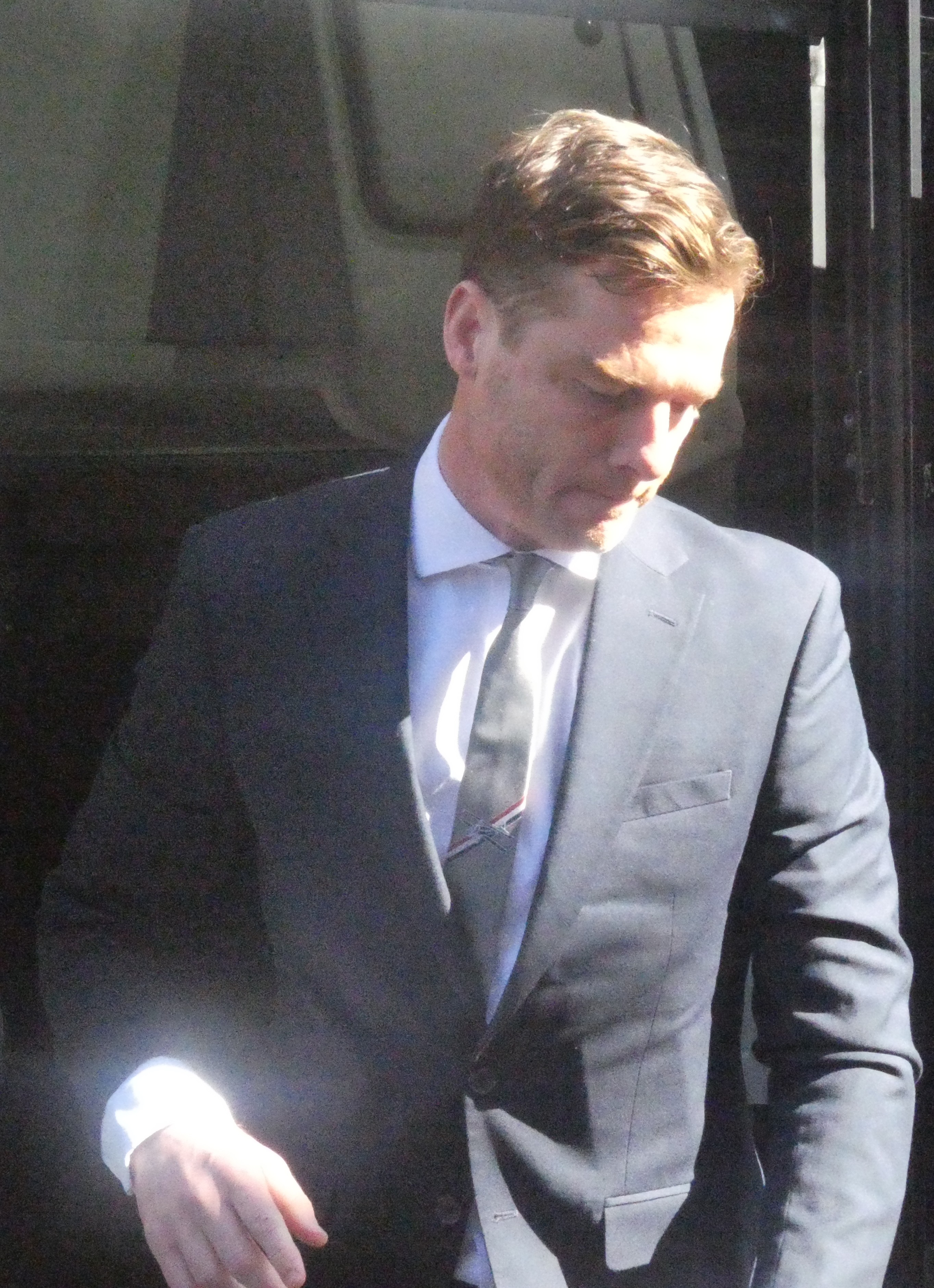
- Parker in 2026

Personal information
- Full name: Scott Matthew Parker
- Date of birth: 13 October 1980 (age 46)
- Place of birth: Lambeth, Greater London, England
- Height: 5 ft 9 in (1.75 m)
- Position: Midfielder

Team information
- Current team: West Ham United (head coach)

Youth career
- 1990–1997: Charlton Athletic

Senior career*
Years	Team	Apps	(Gls)
1997–2004	Charlton Athletic	128	(9)
2000	→ Norwich City (loan)	6	(1)
2004–2005	Chelsea	15	(1)
2005–2007	Newcastle United	55	(4)
2007–2011	West Ham United	113	(10)
2011–2013	Tottenham Hotspur	50	(0)
2013–2017	Fulham	119	(6)
Total		486	(31)

International career
1996–1997	England U16	7	(2)
1999	England U18	3	(1)
1998	England U19	1	(0)
2000–2002	England U21	11	(0)
2003–2013	England	18	(0)

Managerial career
- 2019–2021: Fulham
- 2021–2022: Bournemouth
- 2022–2023: Club Brugge
- 2024–2026: Burnley
- 2026–: West Ham United
- * Club domestic league appearances and goals

Scott Matthew Parker (born 13 October 1980) is an English professional football manager and former player who is the head coach of EFL Championship club West Ham United.

Parker began his career at Charlton Athletic, and was loaned to Norwich City, before joining Chelsea for a £10 million fee in January 2004. He did not play regularly at Chelsea, and moved to Newcastle United the following year, where he was made captain. Parker joined West Ham United in 2007, and was the FWA Footballer of the Year for the 2010–11 season despite the club being relegated. He was then signed by Tottenham Hotspur and joined Fulham in 2013. He would play 119 league matches for Fulham in both the Premier League and the Championship, before retiring at the end of the 2016–17 season.

Parker has represented England at every level from under-16 to senior, making his full debut in 2003. Uniquely, he won his first four England caps while playing for four different clubs. Parker was a member of the England team which reached the quarter-finals at UEFA Euro 2012.

Parker was appointed caretaker manager of Fulham in February 2019, and hired on a permanent basis that summer. In his first season in charge, he guided them to promotion to the Premier League after winning the Championship play-offs, but they were relegated back the following season. He then left to join Bournemouth in 2021, and again won promotion from the Championship in his first season. After a 9–0 loss to Liverpool in the club's fourth league game of the season, he was dismissed, and then hired by Club Brugge, from which he was sacked after 12 games in March 2023. In July 2024, he was appointed as the head coach of Burnley, and won them promotion to the Premier League in his first season in charge, but they were relegated the following season. In November 2026, he joined West Ham United as head coach.

== Early life ==
Scott Matthew Parker was born on 13 October 1980 in Lambeth, Greater London, and attended Haberdashers' Aske's Hatcham College in New Cross. As a 13-year-old, he appeared in a well-known English advert for McDonald's, in which he played keepie uppie, during the 1994 FIFA World Cup campaign. Parker is a graduate of The Football Association's now-defunct national School of Excellence at Lilleshall.

== Playing career ==
=== Club career ===
==== Charlton Athletic ====
After graduating from Lilleshall, Parker signed for Charlton Athletic as a trainee and made his first-team debut as a substitute against Bury in the First Division on 23 August 1997, a match which ended 0–0. He signed his first professional contract with the club two months later. Over the next couple of years he made only a few sporadic substitute appearances for Charlton, although he was one of the brightest prospects in English football. In October 2000, Charlton, then in the Premier League, loaned Parker to First Division club Norwich City for two months to give the England under-21 international some first-team experience. At Norwich he scored once against Sheffield Wednesday. On his return to The Valley, Parker was immediately called into the first team to replace injured captain Mark Kinsella. Parker played so well for Charlton that, upon his return from injury, Kinsella could not regain his place in the starting line-up. Parker soon became the linchpin of Charlton's midfield, combining tenacious tackling with an ability to carry the ball quickly from defence to attack and play telling passes, creating many chances for his teammates.

==== Chelsea ====
Parker, who had been consistently linked with moves away from Charlton for several years, finally left The Valley on 30 January 2004 to join Chelsea on a four-and-a-half-year contract for a £10 million fee. Alan Curbishley, the Charlton manager, criticised his attitude following news of Chelsea's interest, accusing him of bad behaviour and saying that "...his conduct in training has not been what it should have been." Parker was initially signed as cover for Claude Makélélé and Frank Lampard, but did not get too many chances to play in his preferred position. He scored his only goal for Chelsea in a 2–0 win against Portsmouth at Fratton Park on 11 February. At the end of the 2003–04 season, Parker was named as the PFA Young Player of the Year.

Following the summer signings of Arjen Robben and Tiago Mendes, Parker's first-team opportunities were limited during 2004–05 season. Although he found first-team opportunities hard to come by at Chelsea, he was a regular starter in Chelsea's League Cup matches, a competition where he played in three consecutive victories against West Ham, Newcastle and Fulham. His problems were compounded when he broke a metatarsal bone in a match against his former club, Norwich City. Due to this injury, Parker missed both legs of the League Cup semi-final against Manchester United and the final against Liverpool, although he took part in the celebrations.

==== Newcastle United ====
Parker was sold the following summer, moving to Newcastle United in July 2005 for a £6.5 million fee. He became a regular in the Newcastle first team and was one of the few players at the club to show any consistency during an often difficult season in which Newcastle finished in seventh place, despite having a very poor start under Graeme Souness. His first Newcastle goal came against his former club Charlton in a 3–1 defeat on 25 March 2006. Later that month he was diagnosed with glandular fever, putting an end to his season. The timing was especially unfortunate for Parker, who had been playing well for Newcastle, as it ended any hopes he may have had of forcing his way into the 2006 FIFA World Cup.

In July 2006, he was named Newcastle United's new captain by manager Glenn Roeder, succeeding the retired Alan Shearer. His first goal as captain came against Wigan Athletic on 19 August 2006, in a 2–1 win on the first day of the season. Parker scored his second goal of the season against Fulham in September 2006, but after he was substituted Newcastle conceded 2 goals and subsequently lost the match. Despite Newcastle's poor form, his performances earned him a recall to the England squad in September after an absence of more than two years. In November, Parker scored a goal in the 116th minute against Watford in the League Cup and then scored in the penalty shoot-out to allow Newcastle to progress in the competition. He scored his fourth goal of 2006–07 against Tottenham Hotspur in December 2006.

Scott Parker was found to be the second best player in the country for December 2006 by Sky Sports and Opta Index. He led Newcastle on their way to UEFA Intertoto Cup victory and was presented with the Intertoto Cup plaque in March 2007 before the UEFA Cup first-leg tie with AZ.

==== West Ham United ====
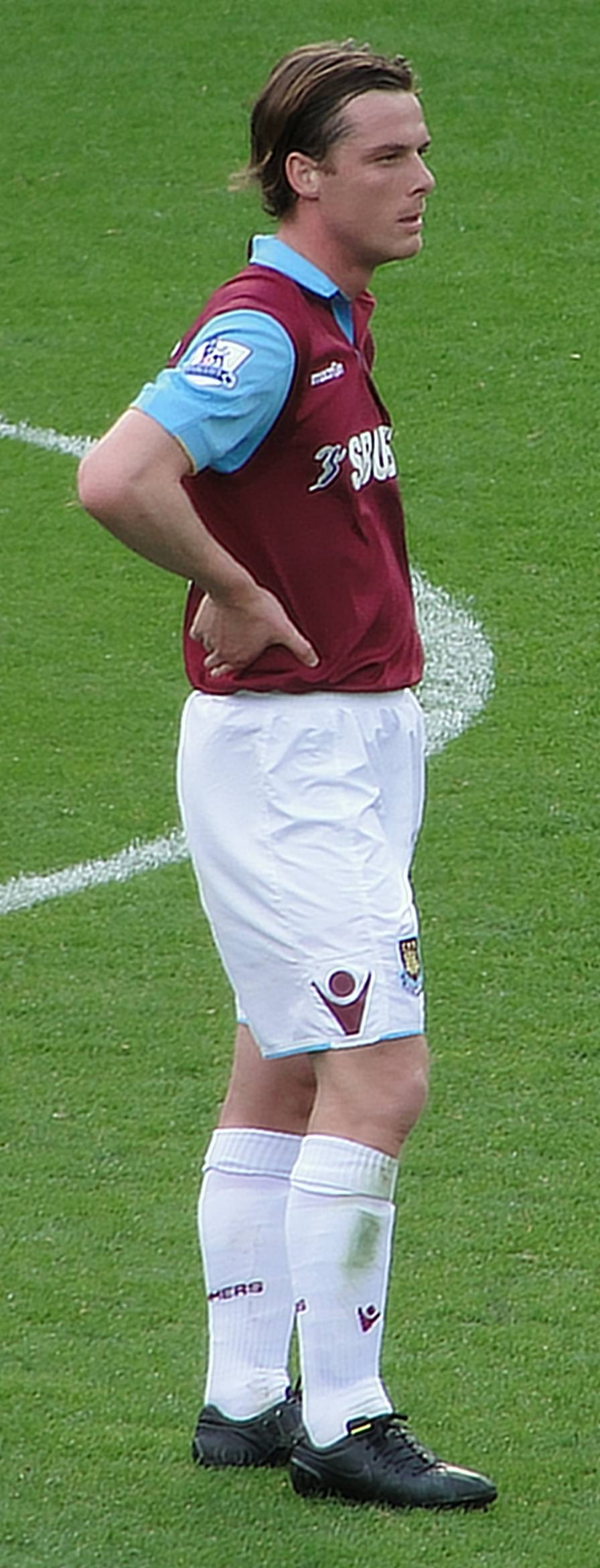
Parker playing for West Ham United in 2011

In June 2007, West Ham United signed Scott Parker for a £7 million fee. Due to injury, he did not make his first-team debut until 26 September 2007 in the 1–0 League Cup victory against Plymouth Argyle. His full Premier League debut came on 29 September 2007 in the 1–0 home defeat to Arsenal, a match which saw Parker sustaining another injury and being substituted for Hayden Mullins at half-time. Parker scored his first goal for West Ham, a last-minute winner in the 2–1 win at Middlesbrough on 22 December 2007.

In 2008–09, Parker played a major part of West Ham's season and on 24 May 2009 was voted Hammer of the Year, by the club's supporters. and became the first player since Julian Dicks in 1997 to retain the award after winning again on 4 May 2010.

He was again one of West Ham's key players in 2009–10, scoring the winning goal in a vital 3–2 win against Wigan Athletic, which ensured another season of Premier League football for West Ham.

In July 2010, West Ham chairman David Sullivan stated that Parker was not for sale to another club at any price. This came after a bid from Tottenham Hotspur and also public interest from Aston Villa. In September 2010 Parker signed a new, five-year, contract with West Ham which also made him the highest paid player in the club's history.

Parker scored three goals in his first six appearances in 2010–11. His goals came in matches against Oxford United, Chelsea, and Stoke City. He was widely regarded as one of the most consistent English midfielders over the previous few years. There were calls from England supporters and Avram Grant for the midfielder to be included in England's squad and feature on a regular basis.

On 12 February Carlton Cole praised Scott Parker's "inspirational" pep talk at half time after, being 3–0 down, West Ham earned a 3–3 draw against West Bromwich Albion. Cole was quoted as saying of the talk "If you were there you would have had a tear in your eye". Parker was named Premier League Player of the Month for February 2011 following his performances in West Ham's 3–1 wins over Blackpool and Liverpool. Following his performances for West Ham despite their relegation, and his England recall, Parker was placed on the six-strong shortlist for the prestigious PFA Players' Player of the Year Award. He missed out on the PFA award but was named the FWA Footballer of the Year.

Parker started the first four matches of 2011–12 for West Ham United in the Championship and scored his first goal of the season, and tenth league goal for the club against Watford on 16 August 2011.

Amid speculation that Tottenham Hotspur would sign the player, Parker handed West Ham co-owner David Gold a hand written transfer request, saying "I have had a fantastic four years at West Ham United and will never forget all the support I have had from the fans and everyone associated with the club." "The manager and board have tried hard to convince me to stay but at this stage in my career, I need to be playing in the Premier League, especially now that I am involved with England." "I hope the fans will understand and respect my decision and I wish the club every success in their fight for promotion this season."

==== Tottenham Hotspur ====
On 31 August 2011, Tottenham and West Ham both announced the transfer of Parker to Spurs, with the fee believed to be £5.5 million. Tottenham said "We are delighted to announce that we have reached agreement with West Ham United for the permanent transfer of Scott Parker." With Scott Parker playing for Tottenham Hotspur, it meant that he was the only player to represent clubs in North, East, South and West London in the Premier League. On 10 September 2011 Parker made his Spurs' debut, providing an assist for fellow debutant Emmanuel Adebayor. He made his home debut the following week in a 4–0 win over Liverpool. Parker finished his first four matches for Tottenham on the winning team. He captained them in a 2–1 away win over Blackburn on 23 October. Parker finished his first season at Tottenham being named as their Player of the Year for the 2011–12 season. Parker was injured on international duty before the start of 2012–13 and did not make his first appearance of the season until 16 December as a 90th-minute substitute.

American journalist William Saletan had high praise for Parker's defensive skills after seeing the QPR match in person at White Hart Lane. "Parker doesn't score or get credited with assists. He leaves that to the guys up front," he wrote.

What Parker does instead is win games. He does this not by punctuating the match but by controlling it. He smothers oncoming attacks. He forces opponents off the ball. He orchestrates distribution out of the back, setting in motion a Spurs onslaught that will culminate 60 yards downfield ... You can't watch the game up close without noticing Parker.

==== Fulham ====
On 19 August 2013, Parker signed a three-year contract with Fulham, for an undisclosed fee. On 23 November 2013, Parker was made captain for the match against Swansea City in the absence of Brede Hangeland, and scored his first goal for them in the 2–1 loss at Craven Cottage. Fulham were relegated at the end of the season. Parker retired from playing in June 2017.

=== International career ===
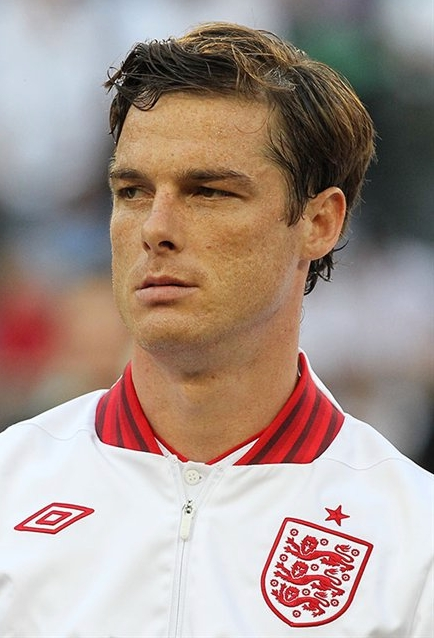
Parker with England at UEFA Euro 2012

Parker represented England at every level from under-16 to the senior team. He earned nine caps for the England under-21 team.

Parker's international debut for the senior England team came on 16 November 2003 when he came on in the 66th minute as a substitute replacing Wayne Rooney in a 3–2 defeat against Denmark.

His form earned him a place in the starting line-up for England's European Championships qualifier away to Croatia on 11 October 2006. In a 3–5–2 formation Parker was restricted to tracking back and covering due to the attacking players in the team like Frank Lampard and Steven Gerrard. England boss Steve McClaren specifically told Parker to chase the wingers and assist the two wing backs, Gary Neville and Ashley Cole. England lost 2–0 and Parker would not feature again for England for four and a half years.

On 11 May 2010, Parker was revealed to be among manager Fabio Capello's 30-man preliminary squad list for the 2010 FIFA World Cup. However, he was not included in the final 23-man squad.

Parker came on as a second-half substitute for Frank Lampard in a friendly against Denmark on 9 February 2011 to become the first player to receive his first four full caps whilst playing for four different clubs . On 26 March that year, he played in the Millennium Stadium against Wales in the qualifiers for UEFA Euro 2012 and was recognised as one of England's top players in the victory, acting as a holding midfielder in Capello's newly adopted 4–3–3 formation.

On 12 November 2011, Parker was named man of the match in a friendly against UEFA Euro 2008 and 2010 FIFA World Cup winners Spain in the 1–0 win. Parker captained England on 29 February 2012 in their 2–3 defeat by the Netherlands at Wembley.

Following Roy Hodgson's appointment as England manager, Parker was selected as part of England's UEFA Euro 2012 preliminary squad and was kept in for the final 23-man squad. He started all four of England's matches, helping the team top their group with wins against Sweden and Ukraine and a draw with France before they were knocked out in the quarter finals by Italy.

His final cap came in March 2013, in a 2014 FIFA World Cup qualification match against San Marino, coming on as a substitute for Frank Lampard.

=== Style of play ===
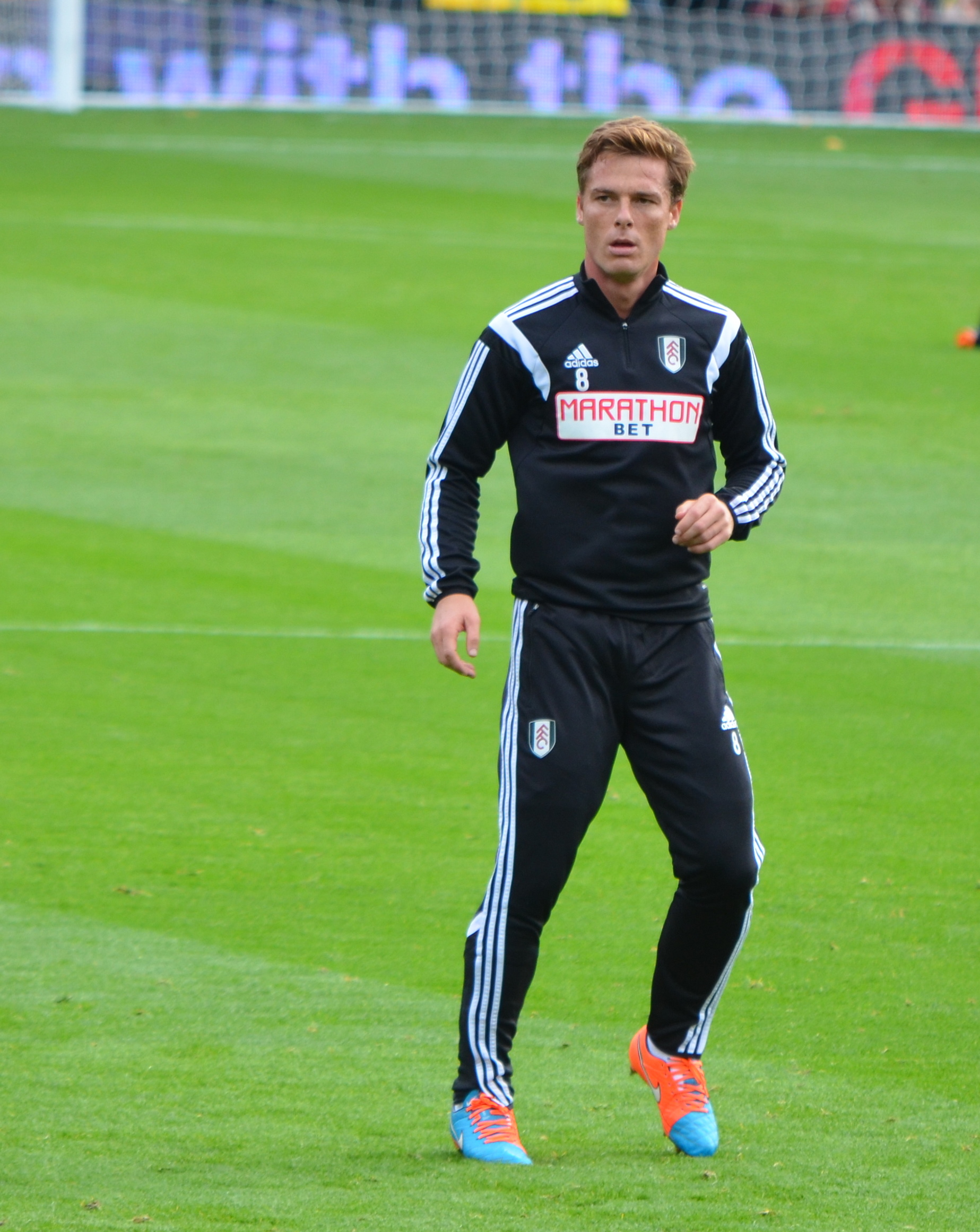
Parker warming up for Fulham in 2014

Parker was known as a tough tackling central midfielder.

On the international stage, Parker had been among the notable England players to have been criticised and panned for their hard-working but less technical style of play. Overlooked for major tournaments such as UEFA Euro 2004 and the 2010 FIFA World Cup, in 2012 Parker was a regular presence in the line-up, being partnered with Steven Gerrard. Although England had a relatively disappointing Euro 2012 campaign, some viewed the partnership of Parker and Gerrard as one of the positives.

== Managerial career ==
=== Fulham ===
Shortly after his retirement from playing, Parker returned to Tottenham Hotspur, coaching their under-18 squad, as well as being announced as a club ambassador. In July 2018, Parker left Tottenham to return to Fulham, who had just gained promotion back to the Premier League, serving as first-team coach, linking up with former manager Slaviša Jokanović. He was retained in his coaching position after Claudio Ranieri was brought in to replace a dismissed Jokanović that November.

Ranieri was dismissed on 28 February 2019, having overseen no improvement to the team's results, leaving the club in a relegation battle. Parker was then appointed as caretaker manager that same day, the club now sat nineteenth in the Premier League table. He took charge of the team for the first time three days later, where they lost 2–1 to visitors Chelsea. Fulham were relegated to the Championship after a disappointing returning league campaign, their relegation confirmed after a 4–1 thrashing by Watford, with five games remaining.

After speculation arose over who would replace Ranieri on a permanent basis following relegation, chairman Shahid Khan appointed Parker as manager permanently on a two-year contract. Parker was able to retain the majority of his players, despite relegation, with star striker Aleksandar Mitrović signing a new contract during the summer. During his first season in charge, the COVID-19 pandemic resulted in all English sport being suspended from March until June 2020; Fulham ultimately finished the season in fourth place, missing out on automatic promotion by two points, thus qualifying to the promotion play-offs. After defeating Cardiff City over two legs in the semi-finals, they beat Brentford in the play-off final to achieve promotion back to the Premier League at the first time of asking.

Fulham's return to the Premier League however did not begin smoothly: they lost their first four games and failed to win until November, when they beat relegation rivals West Bromwich Albion 2–0 at Craven Cottage. Towards the end of the 2020–21 season, Parker reportedly became a surprise contender for the Tottenham Hotspur managerial vacancy, after José Mourinho was dismissed, but he remained at the club. Parker's side were relegated to the Championship once again in May 2021 after suffering defeat to Burnley, who were above them in the Premier League table. Following relegation, Parker said that Fulham must try to break the cycle of relegation and promotion and establish themselves in the top flight. On 28 June, the club announced that Parker had left by mutual consent.

=== Bournemouth ===
The same day his departure from Fulham was finalised, Parker was appointed as head coach of Bournemouth, replacing Jonathan Woodgate on a three-year contract. After guiding the club to 13 points from a possible 15, Parker was awarded the league's Manager of the Month award for September 2021. Parker won the award again in October after leading Bournemouth to five wins in five matches, conceding just one goal in the process. Parker guided Bournemouth to promotion back to the Premier League after two years away in his first season as manager. The side finished as runners-up to Fulham sealing second place on 3 May, with one game remaining in the season, with a 1–0 win against fourth-placed Nottingham Forest.

Bournemouth won their first game back in the top flight, defeating Aston Villa 2–0 at home on 6 August. After that win, the team lost its next three games by an aggregate score of 16–0, losing 4–0 to Manchester City, 3–0 to Arsenal, before a 9–0 loss away at Liverpool on 27 August, a joint-record for the largest score margin in Premier League history. Following the Liverpool match, Parker expressed his frustrations with the club's transfer policy, stating they were currently "unequipped" for the Premier League. Three days after the Liverpool match, Bournemouth announced they had parted company with Parker. Gary O'Neil succeeded Parker.

=== Club Brugge ===
On 31 December 2022, Parker was appointed manager of Belgian champions Club Brugge, succeeding Carl Hoefkens at a team in fourth place and 12 points off the lead. His first game on 8 January was a 3–1 loss at leaders Genk in the Pro League. Parker inherited a team that had reached the last 16 of the UEFA Champions League, where his team lost 7–1 on aggregate to Benfica. On 8 March, the day after the 5–1 second leg defeat at the Estádio da Luz, and having won twice in 12 overall games to fall to 21 points off the lead, he was dismissed. Ronny Deila was his successor.

=== Burnley ===
On 5 July 2024, Burnley confirmed the appointment of Parker as head coach on a three-year contract. He replaced Vincent Kompany, who had left for Bayern Munich. On 21 April 2025, Parker guided Burnley to Premier League football following a 2–1 win at Turf Moor to Sheffield United. In a post-match interview Parker credited the player group, club and fans, and advised overall life perspective. He was named Championship Manager of the Month for April 2025 following sixteen points from six matches.

On 30 April 2026, Burnley announced that Parker had left the club by mutual consent, eight days after a 1–0 loss to Manchester City confirmed the club's relegation back to the EFL Championship.

=== West Ham United ===
On 4 November 2026, Parker returned to West Ham United as head coach on a two-and-a-half-year deal. He replaced Nuno Espírito Santo after his disappointing start to the season. Parker's first game managing West Ham saw his side fight back from a 3-goal half-time deficit for a 3–3 draw against Cardiff City later that same day.

== Personal life ==
Parker met Carly Arter when he was 16, and they married when he was 20. The couple have four sons.

Parker is the brother-in-law of footballer Harry Arter, whom he managed at Fulham.

== Career statistics ==
=== Club ===
Appearances and goals by club, season and competition
Club	Season	League			FA Cup		League Cup		Other		Total	
Club	Season	Division	Apps	Goals	Apps	Goals	Apps	Goals	Apps	Goals	Apps	Goals
Charlton Athletic	1997–98	First Division	3	0	1	0	0	0	0	0	4	0
Charlton Athletic	1998–99	Premier League	4	0	1	0	1	0	—		6	0
Charlton Athletic	1999–2000	First Division	15	1	1	0	2	0	—		18	1
Charlton Athletic	2000–01	Premier League	20	1	3	0	2	0	—		25	1
Charlton Athletic	2001–02	Premier League	38	1	0	0	3	0	—		41	1
Charlton Athletic	2002–03	Premier League	28	4	1	0	0	0	—		29	4
Charlton Athletic	2003–04	Premier League	20	2	0	0	2	1	—		22	3
Charlton Athletic	Total		128	9	7	0	10	1	0	0	145	10
Norwich City (loan)	2000–01	First Division	6	1	—		—		—		6	1
Chelsea	2003–04	Premier League	11	1	1	0	—		5 (Note: Appearances in UEFA Champions League)	0	17	1
Chelsea	2004–05	Premier League	4	0	0	0	3	0	4	0	11	0
Chelsea	Total		15	1	1	0	3	0	9	0	28	1
Newcastle United	2005–06	Premier League	26	1	3	1	2	0	1 (Note: Appearance in UEFA Intertoto Cup)	0	32	2
Newcastle United	2006–07	Premier League	29	3	0	0	2	1	10 (Note: Two appearances in UEFA Intertoto Cup, eight appearances in UEFA Cup)	0	41	4
Newcastle United	Total		55	4	3	1	4	1	11	0	73	6
West Ham United	2007–08	Premier League	18	1	0	0	2	0	—		20	1
West Ham United	2008–09	Premier League	28	1	3	0	1	0	—		32	1
West Ham United	2009–10	Premier League	31	2	0	0	2	0	—		33	2
West Ham United	2010–11	Premier League	32	5	3	0	5	2	—		40	7
West Ham United	2011–12	Championship	4	1	—		0	0	—		4	1
West Ham United	Total		113	10	6	0	10	2	—		129	12
Tottenham Hotspur	2011–12	Premier League	29	0	5	0	0	0	0	0	34	0
Tottenham Hotspur	2012–13	Premier League	21	0	2	0	0	0	6 (Note: Appearances in UEFA Europa League)	0	29	0
Tottenham Hotspur	Total		50	0	7	0	0	0	6	0	63	0
Fulham	2013–14	Premier League	29	2	1	0	2	0	—		32	2
Fulham	2014–15	Championship	37	3	2	0	2	0	—		41	3
Fulham	2015–16	Championship	24	1	0	0	0	0	—		24	1
Fulham	2016–17	Championship	29	0	1	0	1	0	0	0	31	0
Fulham	Total		119	6	4	0	5	0	0	0	128	6
Career total			486	31	28	1	32	4	26	0	572	36

=== International ===
Appearances and goals by national team and year
National team	Year	Apps	Goals
England	2003	1	0
England	2004	1	0
England	2006	1	0
England	2011	7	0
England	2012	7	0
England	2013	1	0
Total		18	0

== Managerial statistics ==
As of match played 21 November 2026

Managerial record by team and tenure
Team	From	To	Record					Ref.
Team	From	To	P	W	D	L	Win %	Ref.
Fulham	28 February 2019	28 June 2021	105	37	25	43	35.2	
Bournemouth	28 June 2021	30 August 2022	55	28	14	13	50.9	
Club Brugge	31 December 2022	8 March 2023	12	2	6	4	16.7	
Burnley	5 July 2024	30 April 2026	88	36	24	28	40.9	
West Ham United	4 November 2026	Present	3	0	2	1	0.0	
Total			263	103	71	89	39.2	

== Honours ==
=== Player ===
Charlton Athletic

- Football League First Division: 1999–2000

Chelsea

- Football League Cup: 2004–05

Newcastle United

- UEFA Intertoto Cup: 2006

Individual

- Charlton Athletic Player of the Year: 2002–03
- Charlton Athletic Young Player of the Year: 1998–99
- PFA Young Player of the Year: 2003–04
- West Ham United Hammer of the Year: 2008–09, 2009–10, 2010–11
- Premier League Player of the Month: February 2011, November 2011
- FWA Footballer of the Year: 2010–11
- England Player of the Year: 2011
- PFA Team of the Year: 2011–12 Premier League

=== Manager ===
Fulham

- EFL Championship play-offs: 2020

Bournemouth

- EFL Championship runner-up: 2021–22

Burnley

- EFL Championship runner-up: 2024–25

Individual

- EFL Championship Manager of the Month: September 2021, October 2021, April 2025
- EFL Championship Manager of the Season: 2024–25
