= Martin Pringle =

Swedish footballer and manager (born 1970)

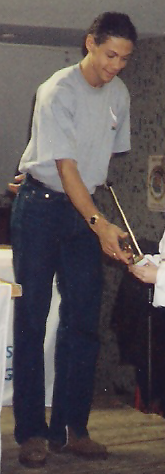
- Pringle in 1995

Personal information
- Full name: Martin Ulf Pringle
- Date of birth: 18 November 1970 (age 55)
- Place of birth: Gothenburg, Sweden
- Height: 1.88 m (6 ft 2 in)
- Position: Centre forward

Team information
- Current team: Varbergs BoIS (manager)

Youth career
- Stenungsund

Senior career*
Years	Team	Apps	(Gls)
1991–1994	Stenungsund		
1994–1996	Helsingborgs IF	64	(15)
1996–1999	Benfica	41	(6)
1999	→ Charlton Athletic (loan)	7	(3)
1999–2002	Charlton Athletic	58	(8)
2002	→ Grimsby Town (loan)	2	(0)
Total		172	(32)

International career
1995–1996	Sweden	2	(1)

Managerial career
- 2003–2004: GAIS (assistant)
- 2004–2008: Göteborg FC (women)
- 2008–2009: Örgryte (assistant)
- 2009–2011: Västra Frölunda
- 2011: FC Copenhagen (assistant)
- 2012–2014: FC Copenhagen B
- 2014–2015: Ängelholms FF (assistant)
- 2015–2018: Eskilsminne IF
- 2019–: Varbergs BoIS (director of sports)
- * Club domestic league appearances and goals

Martin Ulf Pringle (born 18 November 1970) is a Swedish former professional footballer who played as a centre forward, and the current manager of Varbergs BoIS.

As a player, he played from 1991 until his career was cut short by injury in 2002. Having started his career with Stenungsund he soon moved on to Helsingborgs IF before a switch to Portugal in 1996 with Benfica. In 1999, he moved to England with Charlton Athletic. Having suffered a horrific injury at Athletic that sidelined him for up to a year he returned in 2002 in a loan spell with Grimsby Town but was forced to retire in his second game for the club following a leg breaking tackle that ended his professional football career.

Pringle has since subsequently forged a career in coaching, notably in women's football.

== Club career ==
=== Early career and Benfica ===
Born in Gothenburg of Jamaican descent, Pringle did not play top flight football until well into his 20s, when he joined Helsingborgs IF. After consistent performances, he caught the eye of Portugal's S.L. Benfica, which signed him in August 1996.

However, Pringle's chances at the Lisbon club were very limited, and he amassed just over 40 league appearances in nearly three full seasons. His best individual campaign was his first, as he started in 11 of his 15 matches and scored three times with Benfica eventually ranking third.

=== Charlton Athletic ===
In January 1999, Pringle signed for Premier League outfit Charlton Athletic on a two-month loan from Benfica. Under the stewardship of Alan Curbishley, the club was embroiled in a relegation battle and had added Pringle to bolster the club's attacking ranks which included the likes of Clive Mendonca, Andy Hunt, Kevin Lisbie and Bradley Allen. He was handed his debut on 9 January 1999 in the club's 1–3 away defeat against Southampton when he replaced Steve Jones in the 71st minute.

In his second game for Charlton, Pringle scored a dramatic 90th minute equaliser against Newcastle United in a 2–2 draw at The Valley. In March 1999, following his two-month loan at the club, he signed permanently for a fee of £800,000 but, ultimately was unable to help the Addicks avoid relegation, finishing the season with three goals in 18 games.

During the 1999–2000 season, Pringle and Charlton were eventual winners of the First Division and earned an automatic return to the top flight. He remained a favoured forward in the team's strike force, scoring another Premier League goal against Chelsea in a 2–0 win on 18 November 2000, but spent the entire following campaign on the sidelines due to injury.

==== Loan to Grimsby Town ====
On his return to fitness, Pringle was loaned out to First Division outfit Grimsby Town, along with Charlton teammate Andy Todd, in February 2002. He made his debut for his new team in a 0–0 away draw with Nottingham Forest on 23 February 2002. In his second game for the Mariners, with the score 3–1 in their favour against Stockport County, opposition defender Dave Challinor went in for a challenge on Pringle, which would break one of his legs in two places. He was rushed immediately to the Diana, Princess of Wales Hospital in Grimsby.

==== Retirement ====
Despite his injury, Pringle was subsequently given the opportunity to stay at Charlton and was given a squad number and registered for the club for the 2002–03 season. On 4 November 2002, however, he was forced to retire from professional football.

== International career ==
Pringle was capped twice by Sweden during one year, his debut coming in 1995.

== Managerial career ==
Pringle then took up coaching, his first head coach spell being with Kopparbergs/Göteborg FC in the Swedish Women's League. In 2008, he returned to the men's game, assisting at Örgryte IS.

In December 2009, Pringle was named Västra Frölunda IF manager. On 11 July 2011, he and Johan Lange joined Roland Nilsson's coaching staff at FC Copenhagen. In 2014 he returned to Sweden, first to assist Ängelholms FF and then to manage Eskilsminne IF. In December 2019 he started as director of sports in then-newly promoted Allsvenskan club Varbergs BoIS.

== Career statistics ==
Appearances and goals by national team and year
National team	Year	Apps	Goals
Sweden	1995	1	0
Sweden	1996	1	1
Total		2	1

Scores and results list Sweden's goal tally first, score column indicates score after each Pringle goal.

List of international goals scored by Martin Pringle
No.	Date	Venue	Opponent	Score	Result	Competition	Ref.
1	22 January 1996	Hong Kong Stadium, Causeway Bay, Hong Kong Island, Hong Kong	Japan	1–1	1–1 (a.e.t.)	1996 Lunar New Year Cup	

== Honours ==
Charlton Athletic

- Football League First Division: 1999–2000
