= Frazer Toms =

English footballer

Personal information
- Date of birth: 13 September 1979 (age 47)
- Place of birth: Ealing, London, England
- Height: 6 ft 1 in (1.85 m)
- Position: Left midfielder

Senior career*
Years	Team	Apps	(Gls)
1998–1999	Charlton Athletic	0	(0)
1999–2003	Barnet	115	(7)
2003–2004	St Albans City	1	(0)
2004	Farnborough Town	4	(0)
2005–2006	Northwood	11	(0)
2006	King's Lynn	?	(?)
2006–2007	Harlow Town	?	(?)
2007	Harrow Borough	?	(?)
2007–2008	Barton Rovers	?	(?)
2008–2009	Uxbridge	?	(?)
Total		131	(7)
- * Club domestic league appearances and goals

Frazer Toms (born 13 September 1979) in Ealing, London, England, is an English professional footballer who played for Barnet in the Football League. After retiring as a player, Toms coached Surrey United teams in Surrey, British Columbia.
