= Paul Emblen =

English footballer

Personal information
- Full name: Paul David Emblen
- Date of birth: 3 April 1976 (age 50)
- Place of birth: Bromley, England
- Height: 5 ft 11 in (1.80 m)
- Position: Midfielder

Senior career*
Years	Team	Apps	(Gls)
1993–1997	Tonbridge Angels	140	(31)
1997–1998	Charlton Athletic	4	(0)
1997–1998	→ Brighton & Hove Albion (loan)	16	(4)
1998	→ Wycombe Wanderers (loan)	4	(0)
1998–2002	Wycombe Wanderers	59	(3)
2002–2005	Tonbridge Angels	21	(10)
Total		244	(48)
- * Club domestic league appearances and goals

Paul David Emblen (born 3 April 1976) is an English former professional footballer who played for Tonbridge Angels, Charlton Athletic, Brighton & Hove Albion and Wycombe Wanderers. His brother Neil was also a professional footballer.
