= Lee Doherty =

English footballer

Personal information
- Full name: Lee Joseph Doherty
- Date of birth: 6 February 1980 (age 46)
- Place of birth: Camden, England
- Position: Defender

Youth career
- 1997–1998: Arsenal

Senior career*
Years	Team	Apps	(Gls)
1998–1999	Charlton Athletic	0	(0)
1999	Brighton & Hove Albion	3	(0)
1999–2000	Chesham United		
2000	Crawley Town		
2000	Wealdstone		
2000	Ware		
2000	Bishop's Stortford		
- St Albans City
- Grays Athletic
2001–200?	Crawley Town		
- Fisher Athletic
200?–2002	Tooting & Mitcham United		
2002–	Enfield		
- Molesey
- Dulwich Hamlet
- Walton & Hersham
- Wembley
- Leatherhead
- * Club domestic league appearances and goals

Lee Joseph Doherty (born 6 February 1980) is an English former professional footballer who played in the Football League for Brighton & Hove Albion.

== Career ==
Doherty began his career as an apprentice at Arsenal, but never made a league appearance for the club. He moved on to Charlton Athletic in December 1998, but made no senior appearances before joining Brighton & Hove Albion three months later. He made his Football League debut on 20 March 1999 in a goalless draw away to Hartlepool United, and appeared twice more in Third Division matches, but was released at the end of the season. After a spell with Isthmian League club Chesham United, he signed for Crawley Town of the Southern League in January 2000. He continued his tour of non-league football in London and the home counties with clubs including Wealdstone, Ware, Bishop's Stortford, St Albans City, Grays Athletic, Fisher Athletic, Tooting & Mitcham United, Enfield, Molesey, Dulwich Hamlet, Walton & Hersham, Wembley and Leatherhead.
