= Kevin Lisbie =

Footballer (born 1978)

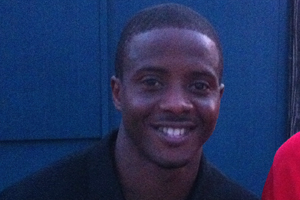
- Lisbie at Leyton Orient in 2013

Personal information
- Full name: Kevin Anthony Lisbie
- Date of birth: 17 October 1978 (age 48)
- Place of birth: Hackney, England
- Height: 5 ft 10 in (1.78 m)
- Position: Striker

Team information
- Current team: Cray Valley Paper Mills (manager)

Youth career
- 1994–1996: Charlton Athletic

Senior career*
Years	Team	Apps	(Gls)
1996–2007	Charlton Athletic	155	(16)
1999	→ Gillingham (loan)	7	(4)
1999	→ Reading (loan)	2	(0)
2000–2001	→ Queens Park Rangers (loan)	2	(0)
2005	→ Norwich City (loan)	6	(1)
2006	→ Derby County (loan)	7	(1)
2007–2008	Colchester United	42	(17)
2008–2011	Ipswich Town	41	(6)
2009–2010	→ Colchester United (loan)	41	(13)
2010–2011	→ Millwall (loan)	20	(4)
2011–2015	Leyton Orient	111	(46)
2015	→ Stevenage (loan)	3	(0)
2015–2016	Barnet	3	(0)
2017	Whitehawk	2	(0)
2017–2021	Cray Valley Paper Mills	54	(41)
2022	VCD Athletic	6	(3)
Total		502	(152)

International career^{‡}
2002–2004	Jamaica	10	(2)

Managerial career
- 2026–: Cray Valley Paper Mills
- * Club domestic league appearances and goals as of 23:59, 11 February 2023 (UTC) ‡ National team caps and goals as of 23:59, 11 February 2023 (UTC)

Kevin Anthony Lisbie (born 17 October 1978) is a former professional footballer and manager who played as a striker. Born in London, he earned ten international caps for Jamaica. He is currently manager at Cray Valley Paper Mills.

== Club career ==
=== Charlton Athletic ===
Born in Hackney, London, to Jamaican parents, Lisbie made his professional debut for Charlton Athletic during the 1996–97 season.

He joined Queens Park Rangers on a month-long loan in December 2000. He was placed on the transfer list by Charlton in February 2002, but eventually signed a new two-year deal with Charlton in May. Reading had been tracking Lisbie, but ended their interest in late 2003, although Reading manager Alan Pardew said he would wait until Lisbie's contract with Charlton would come to an end. Possibly his best moment in a Charlton shirt was a hat-trick against Liverpool in a 3–2 win over the Merseyside club in September 2003. Lisbie signed a new three-year deal with Charlton in June 2004. He was a regular for Charlton during the 2004–05 season, until he started suffering from a series of nosebleeds, which revealed a benign tumour in the back of his nose, which was treated over the summer of 2005.

Lisbie made a month-long loan move to Norwich City in September 2005 and was recalled by Charlton in October. Later that season, in February 2006, he spent a month on loan at Derby County as the club tried to resolve an injury crisis. Lisbie was ruled out for three months with a shoulder injury in October 2006, and returned for Charlton's game against Bolton Wanderers in January 2007.

Lisbie was released by Charlton in July of that year after struggling to break into the first team.

=== Colchester United ===
In August 2007, following a successful trial period, Lisbie joined Colchester United. Over the season he scored 17 goals and finished the club's top scorer, but could not prevent Colchester's relegation from the Championship. Colchester, trying to fend off interest in Lisbie from their East Anglian rivals Ipswich Town, offered him a new contract. However, Ipswich triggered a release clause in Lisbie's contract and the transfer was agreed between the two clubs.

=== Ipswich Town ===
Lisbie signed a three-year deal with Ipswich Town for fee of £600,000 in July 2008. Despite a promising start to his Ipswich career, he struggled to hold down a regular first-team spot.

He was released from his contract at Ipswich Town in May 2011.

==== Loan to Colchester United ====
In August 2009, Lisbie rejoined Colchester United, now playing in League One, on a season-long loan deal. He scored a brace in his second debut for the club in a 7–1 victory against Colchester's recently relegated rivals Norwich City. Lisbie finished as the club's top scorer again with 13 goals as the club finished eighth in League One.

==== Loan to Millwall ====
Lisbie was quickly signed on another season-long loan deal, this time by Kenny Jackett's Millwall side after they secured a return to the Championship in 2010. Lisbie's season was blighted by injury and finished that particular season with four goals in 19 appearances.

=== Leyton Orient ===
Lisbie signed on a free transfer for League One side Leyton Orient on a four-month contract, on 9 September 2011.

During the 2013 January transfer window, Orient accepted an offer from Sheffield United for Lisbie, but the striker turned down talks with the Blades. Orient immediately offered Lisbie a new 18-month contract which he signed on 4 February 2013. He was named as the club's player of the season for 2012–13.

On 4 March 2014, Lisbie signed a new one-year contract extension with Orient.

After a very successful period at Orient, Lisbie suffered a shoulder injury which ruled him out of the first team for much of the early part of the 2014–15 season. On his return, he found it difficult to re-establish his place among several other strikers at the club. On 17 March 2015, he signed on a month's loan with League Two Stevenage with his contract expiring at the end of the season.

=== Later career ===
Lisbie signed for Barnet on 29 May 2015. Following injury problems, he played just four times for the Bees, all as substitute, before leaving the club on 11 January 2016 in search of first-team football, having fallen behind John Akinde, Aaron McLean and Michael Gash in the pecking order. Shortly after his release Lisbie went back to his old club Leyton Orient on trial and played in a reserve game against Southend United.

He continued to keep fit by training with Orient while looking for another club and in January 2017 signed for National League South side Whitehawk. Lisbie scored within four minutes of his full Whitehawk debut in a 3–1 defeat at Crawley Town in the Sussex Senior Cup on 10 January 2017, but left the club the following month after only three substitute appearances; two in the league, and one in the FA Trophy.

Before the 2017–18 season started, Lisbie played and scored in a friendly game for Grays Athletic against Southend Manor. In October 2017 he joined Cray Valley Paper Mills. Lisbie spent two seasons with Cray before retiring after playing in the 2019 FA Vase Final. Lisbie returned for Cray in an FA Trophy match in October 2019. In 2022 he joined VCD Athletic.

== International career ==
Lisbie was capped ten times by Jamaica between 2002 and 2004. He made his debut in a 5–0 friendly defeat against the United States. Lisbie scored twice for Jamaica, both goals coming in 2003, in friendlies against Australia and El Salvador.

== Personal life ==
Lisbie has twin sons, Kyrell and Kyreece, and a younger son Kaion, who also play football. Kyrell scored a penalty equaliser on 15 November 2023 as eighth-tier Cray Valley Paper Mills hosted Charlton in an FA Cup first round replay, albeit in a 6–1 loss for his team. Kaion came on as a sub for Kyreece in Colchester United's EFL Trophy win over Fulham U21s on 11 November 2025 .

== Career statistics ==
=== Club ===
As of 9 April 2022

Appearances and goals by club, season and competition
Club	Season	League			FA Cup		League Cup		Other		Total	
Club	Season	Division	Apps	Goals	Apps	Goals	Apps	Goals	Apps	Goals	Apps	Goals
Charlton Athletic	1996–97	First Division	25	1	1	0	3	0	—		29	1
Charlton Athletic	1997–98	First Division	17	1	0	0	1	0	0	0	18	1
Charlton Athletic	1998–99	Premier League	1	0	0	0	1	0	—		2	0
Charlton Athletic	1999–2000	First Division	0	0	1	0	0	0	—		1	0
Charlton Athletic	2000–01	Premier League	18	0	2	0	2	2	—		22	2
Charlton Athletic	2001–02	Premier League	22	5	2	0	2	0	—		26	5
Charlton Athletic	2002–03	Premier League	32	4	1	0	0	0	—		33	4
Charlton Athletic	2003–04	Premier League	9	4	0	0	1	1	—		10	5
Charlton Athletic	2004–05	Premier League	17	1	0	0	2	0	—		19	1
Charlton Athletic	2005–06	Premier League	6	0	1	0	0	0	—		7	0
Charlton Athletic	2006–07	Premier League	8	0	0	0	1	0	—		9	0
Charlton Athletic	Total		155	16	8	0	13	3	0	0	176	19
Gillingham (loan)	1998–99	Second Division	7	4	0	0	0	0	0	0	7	4
Reading (loan)	1999–2000	Second Division	2	0	0	0	0	0	0	0	2	0
Queens Park Rangers (loan)	2000–01	First Division	2	0	0	0	0	0	—		2	0
Norwich City (loan)	2005–06	Championship	6	1	0	0	0	0	—		6	1
Derby County (loan)	2005–06	Championship	7	1	0	0	0	0	—		7	1
Colchester United	2007–08	Championship	42	17	1	0	0	0	—		43	17
Ipswich Town	2008–09	Championship	41	6	1	0	3	1	—		45	7
Ipswich Town	2009–10	Championship	0	0	0	0	0	0	—		0	0
Ipswich Town	2010–11	Championship	0	0	0	0	0	0	—		0	0
Ipswich Town	Total		41	6	1	0	3	1	—		45	7
Colchester United (loan)	2009–10	League One	41	13	1	0	1	0	0	0	43	13
Millwall (loan)	2010–11	Championship	20	4	1	0	2	0	—		23	4
Leyton Orient	2011–12	League One	37	12	1	0	0	0	0	0	38	12
Leyton Orient	2012–13	League One	28	16	3	0	2	0	1 (Note: Appearance in Football League Trophy)	0	34	16
Leyton Orient	2013–14	League One	39	16	0	0	2	2	1	0	42	18
Leyton Orient	2014–15	League One	7	2	0	0	1	0	0	0	8	2
Leyton Orient	Total		111	46	4	0	5	2	2	0	122	48
Stevenage (loan)	2014–15	League Two	3	0	0	0	0	0	0	0	3	0
Barnet	2015–16	League Two	3	0	1	0	0	0	—		4	0
Whitehawk	2016–17	National League South	2	0	0	0	0	0	1	0	3	0
Cray Valley Paper Mills	2017–18	SCEL Premier Division	25	23	0	0	0	0	5	4	30	27
Cray Valley Paper Mills	2018–19	SCEL Premier Division	22	17	0	0	0	0	13	9	35	26
Cray Valley Paper Mills	2019–20	Isthmian League South East Division	6	1	0	0	0	0	1 (Note: Appearance(s) in FA Trophy)	0	7	1
Cray Valley Paper Mills	2020–21	Isthmian League South East Division	1	0	0	0	0	0	0	0	1	0
Cray Valley Paper Mills	Total		54	41	0	0	0	0	19	13	73	54
VCD Athletic	2021–22	Isthmian League South East Division	6	3	0	0	0	0	0	0	6	3
Career total			502	152	17	0	24	6	22	13	565	171

=== International ===
Appearances and goals by national team and year
National team	Year	Apps	Goals
Jamaica	2002	4	0
Jamaica	2003	4	2
Jamaica	2004	2	0
Total		10	2

Scores and results list Jamaica's goal tally first, score column indicates score after each Lisbie goal.

List of international goals scored by Kevin Lisbie
No.	Date	Venue	Opponent	Score	Result	Competition	Ref.
1	7 September 2003	Madejski Stadium, Reading, England	Australia	1–1	1–2	Friendly	
2	16 November 2003	The National Stadium, Kingston, Jamaica	El Salvador	2–0	3–0	Friendly	

== Honours ==
Individual

- Football League One Player of the Month: November 2012
- Leyton Orient Player of the Season: 2012–13
