= Phil Parry =

Welsh journalist

- Born: Wales
- Occupation(s): Journalist, author
- Years active: 1983–present
- Employer: Freelance
- Notable credit(s): BBC Wales Panorama; Week In, Week Out; Newsnight Wales at One; Good Evening Wales Public Eye BBC 2 Daily Mail South Wales Echo
- Awards: BT Wales - Journalist Of The Year, TV Reporter Of The Year and Radio Reporter Of The Year, BAFTA Cymru, Royal Television Society (RTS)

Phil Parry is a Welsh freelance journalist and author formerly of BBC Cymru Wales. His work has appeared on BBC Wales Panorama, and Newsnight, and he was a presenter on the Welsh current affairs programme Week In, Week Out until 1999. He is winner of Journalist Of The Year, BT Wales TV reporter of the year, and radio reporter of the year. His programmes have won in the current affairs category of the Royal Television Society (RTS) awards, and he has been a reporter on BBC 2’s Public Eye. He currently runs the online investigative website "The Eye".

== Career ==
Parry joined BBC Wales in 1987 where for ten years he was a reporter for Week in Week Out. He later presented BBC Radio Wales news programmes. The 2003 BBC Wales Panorama programme "Fair Cops", presented by Parry, questioned the police investigation of Clydach murderer David Morris. South Wales Police Detective Inspector Shane Ahmed sued the BBC for defamation, and won an out of court settlement. The programme won a BAFTA Cymru award for best current affairs programme in 2004. Afterwards, in 2010, he left the BBC. Since then, he has been a freelance journalist and launched his own investigative website "The Eye" in 2011. Then, in 2019, he wrote and published the book "A Good Story" (ISBN 9781916453258), giving an account of his career in journalism, and his difficulties with hereditary spastic paraplegia.
