= Bradley Allen =

English footballer and coach (born 1971)

Personal information
- Full name: Bradley James Allen
- Date of birth: 13 September 1971 (age 55)
- Place of birth: Harold Wood, London, England
- Height: 5 ft 8 in (1.73 m)
- Position: Forward

Team information
- Current team: Tottenham Hotspur (Academy Coach)

Youth career
- Queens Park Rangers

Senior career*
Years	Team	Apps	(Gls)
1988–1996	Queens Park Rangers	81	(27)
1996–1999	Charlton Athletic	40	(9)
1999	→ Colchester United (loan)	4	(1)
1999–2002	Grimsby Town	80	(15)
2002	Peterborough United	11	(3)
2002–2003	Bristol Rovers	8	(1)
2003–2004	Hornchurch	8	(3)
2004	Redbridge	6	(2)
Total		238	(61)

International career
1992–1993	England U21	8	(2)
- * Club domestic league appearances and goals

Bradley James Allen (born 13 September 1971) is an English football coach and former professional footballer, who is an academy coach at Premier League side Tottenham Hotspur.

As a player, he was a forward who notably played in the Premier League for Queens Park Rangers and Charlton Athletic. He also played in the Football League for Colchester United, Grimsby Town, Peterborough United and Bristol Rovers before finishing his career with spells in non-league with Hornchurch and Redbridge. He represented England at under-21 level, earning eight caps and scoring two goals.

Allen joined Tottenham Hotspur as a youth team coach in 2013, having previously worked as a PE Teacher and sports co-commentator.

== Club career ==
=== Queens Park Rangers ===
Born in Harold Wood, London, Allen began his career with Queens Park Rangers, where he signed professionally in 1988 during the tenure of Jim Smith, although Smith was replaced by Trevor Francis midway through Allen's first professional season. Over the coming years, he went from strength to strength and began to see regular runs in the first-team. During the inaugural Premier League season in 1992–93 season, Allen played six times and scored twice, once in a 1–1 draw with Chelsea in January 1993 and the winner during a 2–1 win against Aston Villa at Loftus Road in May 1993. On 20 November 1993, he scored a hat-trick in a 3–0 win against Everton.

Allen was eventually placed on the transfer list during the ill-fated 1995–96 season in which Rangers were relegated. In total, Allen scored 27 goals in 81 league games for QPR.

=== Charlton Athletic ===
First Division Charlton Athletic paid £400,000 for Allen's services in March 1996. He scored six goals in 21 appearances in the league and League Cup in his first full season with the club but chances became harder to come by for Allen, as he made only 14 first-team appearances and could net only two goals during the 1997–98 season as Charlton were promoted to the Premier League. He then made only one appearance for the club in the 1998–99 season, and then joined Division Two side Colchester United in February 1999. This spelt the end of his time with Charlton, having scored nine goals in 40 league appearances.

Recruited by Colchester manager Mick Wadsworth, Allen made his debut for the U's in a 1–1 home draw with Reading on 27 February 1999, before being replaced by Steve Forbes after 68 minutes. He scored one goal while on loan with the club, a 40th-minute equaliser during a 2–2 draw with Oldham Athletic on 9 March. Allen made four appearances in total during his short stay at Layer Road.

=== Grimsby Town ===
Allen was placed on the transfer list at Charlton and transferred to Grimsby Town in the summer of 1999, who at the time plied their trade in the First Division under Alan Buckley. He scored nine goals in 36 games in all competitions in the 1999–2000 season but found himself limited to just 25 appearances in the 2000–01 season, being limited by injuries and only managing to score six goals. The 2001–02 season saw a return of five goals in 31 games, but his injury record and Grimsby's financial plight saw Allen released at the end of the season. He ended his Grimsby stay with 15 goals in 80 league games.

=== Peterborough United ===
Allen joined Peterborough United on trial in the summer of 2002, where he featured in a friendly against Rushden & Diamonds. However, he initially delayed joining the club and also refused offers from Bristol Rovers, Conference promotion hopefuls Doncaster Rovers and Cyprus-based club APOEL Nicosia. He then had an unsuccessful trial spell with Brighton & Hove Albion before signing for Peterborough on 29 August 2002. Allen scored three goals in 11 games for the Posh but Peterborough chairman Barry Fry confirmed that his short-term contract would not be renewed when it expired in December 2002. Having been linked with a move to Carlisle United.

=== Bristol Rovers ===
Bristol Rovers signed Allen in November 2002 from Peterborough following the expiry of his short-term contract. He made eight appearances in the league for the club and scored one goal against Cambridge United, as he was released at the end of the 2002–03 season. He also scored once in the FA Cup against Rochdale.

=== Hornchurch ===
Ambitious Isthmian League club Hornchurch signed Allen in September 2003 following trials with a number of clubs. He was one of a number of former professional players with Football League experience in a squad that knocked League side Darlington out of the FA Cup in 2003. However, with the club facing financial turmoil, Hornchurch began releasing players during the 2003–04 season, with Allen one of the squad members released.

=== Redbridge ===
Following his release from Hornchurch, Allen quickly joined Conference South side Ford United, who would later change name to become Redbridge. Having scored on his debut, his stint did not last long, and was subsequently released in July 2004, with club manager Craig Edwards stating that the club would prefer "to go with younger players" for the coming season and that there were financial implications. Allen then joined Billericay Town on trial, scoring in a pre-season friendly against Grays Athletic.

== International career ==
Allen represented England at youth level and earned eight caps at under-21 level, where he scored twice.

== Coaching career ==
After retiring from the game in 2004, Allen became a PE teacher and became an academy coach at Tottenham Hotspur, where he is running the under-15 side.

== Media career ==
In addition to his coaching, Allen has worked in the media, providing co-commentary for Sky Sports Football First programme and also for radio coverage. Allen is also a regular co-commentator on BBC London 94.9, formerly alongside Phil Parry.

== Personal life ==
Allen comes from a famous footballing family. He is the son of former Chelsea, Tottenham and QPR player and manager Les Allen. His brother is former England international Clive Allen and his nephew is former Barnet player Oliver Allen. His uncle, Dennis Allen played over 300 league games for Reading, and his cousin Martin Allen has managed a number of Football League clubs, alongside representing QPR and West Ham United. He is also related to Charlie Allen, Martin's son, who has played for Notts County and Gillingham. Bradley is also a cousin to Paul Allen, who made appearances for West Ham, Tottenham and Southampton amongst others.
