= Saša Ilić (footballer, born 1972) =

Serbian-Australian soccer player

Personal information
- Full name: Saša Ilić
- Date of birth: 18 July 1972 (age 54)
- Place of birth: Melbourne, Australia
- Height: 1.93 m (6 ft 4 in)
- Position: Goalkeeper

Youth career
- Broadmeadow Magic
- Bonnyrigg White Eagles

Senior career*
| Years | Team | Apps | (Gls) |
| 1991–1993 | Grafičar Beograd | | |
| 1993–1996 | Radnički Beograd | 61 | (0) |
| 1996-1997 | St. Leonards Stamcroft | | |
| 1997–2002 | Charlton Athletic | 51 | (0) |
| 2000 | → West Ham United (loan) | 1 | (0) |
| 2001 | → Portsmouth (loan) | 7 | (0) |
| 2002–2003 | ZTE | 4 | (0) |
| 2003 | Portsmouth | 0 | (0) |
| 2003–2004 | Barnsley | 25 | (0) |
| 2004–2005 | Blackpool | 3 | (0) |
| 2005 | Aberdeen | 0 | (0) |
| 2005 | Leeds United | 0 | (0) |
| Total | | 152 | (0) |

International career
| 1998–2001 | FR Yugoslavia | 2 | (0) |
- * Club domestic league appearances and goals

Saša Ilić (Serbian Cyrillic: Саша Илић, pronounced [sâʃa ǐːliːt͡ɕ] or [îːliːt͡ɕ]; born 18 July 1972) is a Serbian Australian retired footballer who played as a goalkeeper.

== Club career ==
Born in Melbourne, Ilić started playing soccer with Sydney-based Bonnyrigg White Eagles. He later moved to his parents' home country and started playing for Grafičar Beograd in the Belgrade Zone League, before signing with Radnički Beograd of the First League of FR Yugoslavia.

After moving to England, Ilić played for non-league side St. Leonards Stamcroft. Ilić later credited St Leonards with helping him settle into English football.

In October 1997, Ilić joined Charlton Athletic, where he enjoyed the most notable spell of his career. He was a regular in goal in the latter half of the 1997–98 season and kept a record nine clean sheets in a row, including both play-off semi-finals against Ipswich Town. The run was ended as Charlton gained promotion after a classic 4–4 play-off final, in which he saved the deciding penalty from Michael Gray in a 7–6 win over Sunderland on penalties in the First Division play-off final. After Charlton's relegation in 1998–99, Ilić lost his place in the team to new signing Dean Kiely.

In February 2000 he went on loan to West Ham United but made just one appearance - a 4–0 defeat at home to Everton in the Premier League. In September 2001 he went on loan to Portsmouth and made seven appearances.

Ilić left Charlton in 2002 and joined Hungarian side ZTE where he played against Manchester United in a UEFA Champions League qualifier. ZTE won the first leg 1–0 but lost the second leg 5–0, a game in which Ilić was also sent off for a foul on Ruud van Nistelrooy.

In February 2003 he returned to Portsmouth to provide back up to Shaka Hislop and Yoshikatsu Kawaguchi. However he made no appearances as Portsmouth won promotion to the Premier League, and then joined Barnsley in August 2003.

In March 2005, he signed for Leeds United on a deal until the end of the season.

== International career ==
Ilić made two appearances for the FR Yugoslavia national football team. His debut was in December 1998 in a friendly match against Israel as a second-half substitute and his second and last appearance was in a home loss against Russia during the 2002 FIFA World Cup qualification.

== Honours ==
Charlton Athletic

- Football League First Division play-offs: 1998
