= Eddie Youds =

English footballer

Personal information
- Full name: Edward Paul Youds
- Date of birth: 3 May 1970 (age 56)
- Place of birth: Liverpool, England
- Position: Defender

Senior career*
Years	Team	Apps	(Gls)
1988–1991	Everton	8	(0)
1989	→ Cardiff City (loan)	1	(0)
1990	→ Wrexham (loan)	20	(2)
1991–1995	Ipswich Town	50	(1)
1995	→ Bradford City (loan)	7	(2)
1995–1998	Bradford City	79	(6)
1998–2002	Charlton Athletic	53	(2)
2002–2003	Huddersfield Town	25	(0)
2003–2005	Grays Athletic		
Total		243	(13)
- * Club domestic league appearances and goals

Edward Paul Youds (born 3 May 1970) is an English former professional footballer, who played as a defender from 1988 to 2005.

He notably played in the Premier League with Ipswich Town and Charlton Athletic, having also played in the Football League for Everton, Cardiff City, Wrexham, Bradford City and Huddersfield Town before finishing his career in non-League with Grays Athletic.

== Playing career ==
Born in Liverpool, Youds began his career with Everton and also played for Cardiff City, Wrexham, Ipswich Town, Bradford City, Charlton Athletic, Huddersfield Town and Grays Athletic, before retiring in 2005 at 35.

He was captain for Bradford City's 1996 Second Division play-off final victory against Notts County. While at Charlton, he played in the club's dramatic win over Sunderland in the 1998 First Division play-off final, winning 7–6 on penalties after a 4–4 draw.

== Personal life ==
Youds now works as a property development manager in London.

== Honours ==
Bradford City

- Football League Second Division play-offs: 1996

Charlton Athletic

- Football League First Division: 1999–2000; play-offs: 1998
