= Steve Brown (footballer, born 1972) =

English footballer and manager

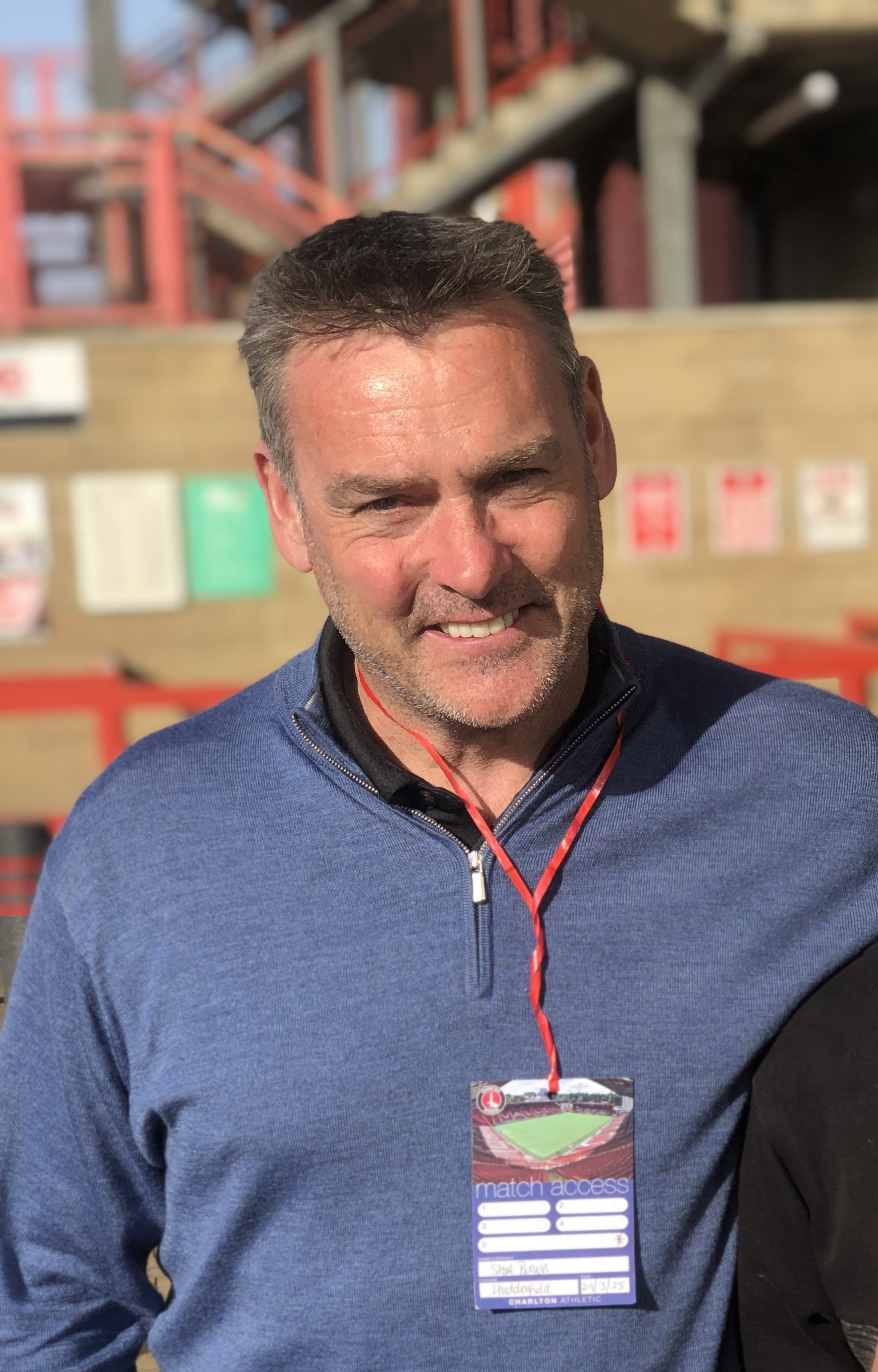
- Steve Brown in 2025

Personal information
- Full name: Steven Byron Brown
- Date of birth: 13 May 1972 (age 54)
- Place of birth: Brighton, England
- Position: Centreback

Youth career
- 1987–1988: Whitehawk
- 1988–1990: Charlton Athletic

Senior career*
Years	Team	Apps	(Gls)
1987–1988	Whitehawk	4	(0)
1990–2002	Charlton Athletic	242	(9)
2002–2005	Reading	40	(1)
Total		286	(10)

Managerial career
- 2013–2014: Ebbsfleet United
- 2015: Lewes
- 2018–2019: Margate
- * Club domestic league appearances and goals

Steven Byron "Steve" Brown (born 13 May 1972) is an English former football player and most recently the manager of Margate.

== Career ==
Born in Brighton, Brown played youth football with Whitehawk, where his father Gary Brown was first team coach. He made his first team debut as a 15-year old in 1988 before being spotted playing for Brighton Boys by Charlton Athletic.

He began with Charlton Athletic in 1988 as a 16-year old, before turning professional at the club where he spent most of his career as a defender. Brown's spell at Charlton saw the club twice gain promotion to the Premier League, once as champions of the First Division in 2000 and the other in their dramatic win over Sunderland in the 1998 play-off final, winning 7–6 on penalties after a 4–4 draw, with Brown scoring one of the penalties. An extremely popular player with supporters, he also acquired the reputation of a versatile player; indeed, he played in goal four times for Charlton without conceding. This memorably happened in the Premier League against Aston Villa when Andy Petterson was sent off. He also captained the side on numerous occasions and played in the team that equalled the league record of 12 straight wins whilst in the First Division (now Championship). He was an integral part of the squad that retained Premier League status in 2001 and he helped Charlton secure their highest-ever finish in the Premier League before his departure in December 2002.

After over twelve years with Charlton, he was signed by former Charlton teammate Alan Pardew for Reading in late 2002. After two and a half years, scoring once against Crystal Palace, he retired from the game with a recurrence of an anterior cruciate ligament injury which had ruptured earlier in his career.

== After football ==
Brown became a youth coach at Charlton Athletic before moving to West Ham United (by then managed by Pardew) to become reserve-team coach. He ended his role in July 2007 after Alan Pardew's dismissal led to changes in the back room staff. Brown then worked as head of football at Ardingly College whilst attaining his UEFA A Licence and led the school's first XI to the quarter-finals of the national cup. Whilst at Ardingly, Brown scouted for Charlton Athletic and was often heard commentating on the radio for BBC London.

After attaining his UEFA A Licence in 2008, Brown agreed to become the Brighton youth team manager. During his spell at Brighton his team finished second and fifth in the league and progressed through to the fourth and third rounds of the FA Youth Cup. In his two-year spell at Brighton, 11 youth players signed professional contracts, five of which made first-team appearances.

In 2011 Brown became Nicky Forster's assistant at Dover Athletic in the Conference South. Dover made the play off final in their second year in charge narrowly losing to Salisbury.

On 3 June 2013, Brown was appointed manager of Ebbsfleet United, succeeding Liam Daish. He appointed former Charlton player Steve Gritt as his assistant.

On 26 November 2014, Ebbsfleet United announced Brown's departure from the club, Brown left with a 52% win ratio and the club sat in fourth position in the league. The previous season saw Ebbsfleet win the Kent senior cup and make the playoff final in his first year as a manager.

On 4 March 2015, Brown was announced as the new interim manager of Isthmian Premier Division side Lewes until the end of this season. After ensuring the Sussex club's survival from relegation after winning 5 of the last 11 games, Brown was appointed Lewes manager on a permanent basis ahead of the 2015–16 season. On 24 September 2015, Brown's resignation was accepted by the Lewes board after a poor start to the season, Brown cited a 33% budget cut as the reason for his resignation.

Brown was manager of Margate FC from November 2016 to February 2019. He is head coach for the 1st Eleven at Lancing College, an independent school in West Sussex. Brown is also a regional scout for Stoke City's Academy and summarises for BBC London, a job he's held since 2004.

== Honours ==
Charlton Athletic

- Football League First Division: 1999–2000; play-offs: 1998
