= Anthony Barness =

English footballer (born 1973)

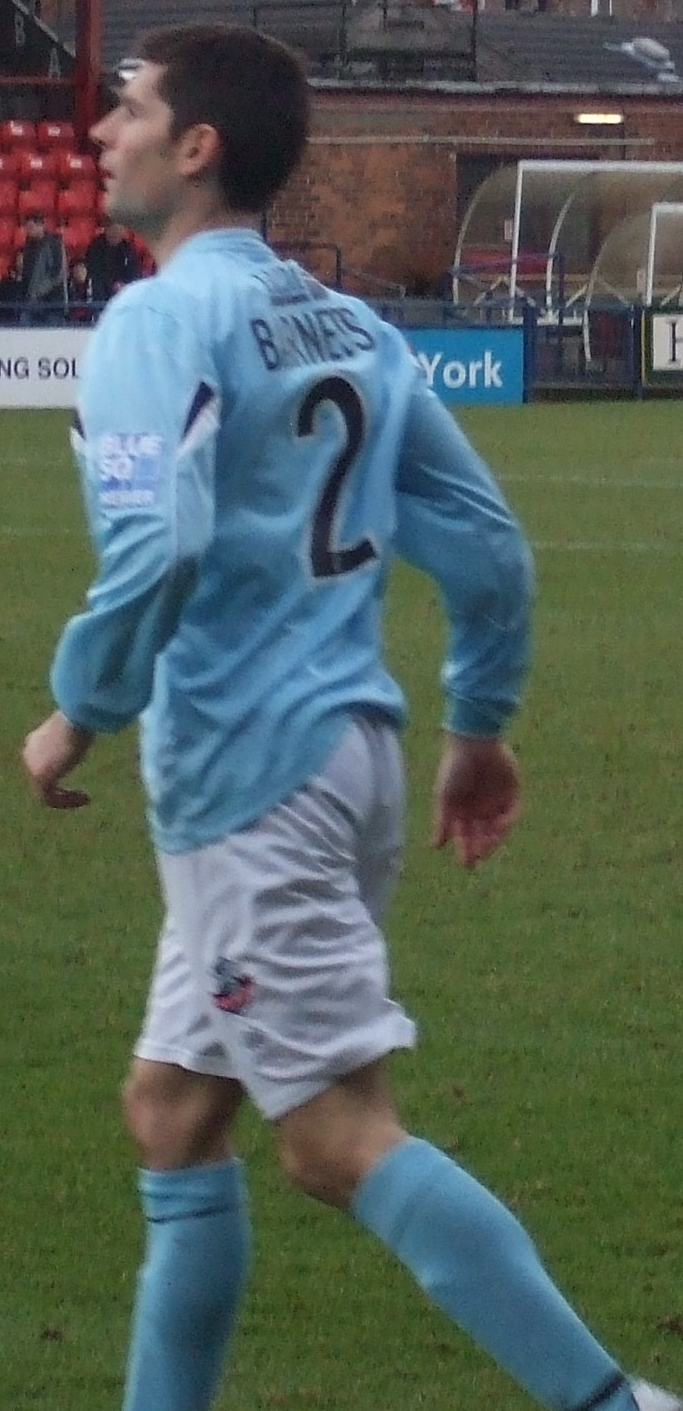
- Barness playing for Lewes in 2009

Personal information
- Full name: Anthony Barness
- Date of birth: 25 February 1973 (age 53)
- Place of birth: Lewisham, London, England
- Height: 5 ft 10 in (1.78 m)
- Position: Defender

Senior career*
| Years | Team | Apps | (Gls) |
| 1991–1992 | Charlton Athletic | 27 | (1) |
| 1992–1996 | Chelsea | 14 | (0) |
| 1993 | → Middlesbrough (loan) | 0 | (0) |
| 1996 | → Southend United (loan) | 5 | (0) |
| 1996–2000 | Charlton Athletic | 93 | (3) |
| 2000–2005 | Bolton Wanderers | 93 | (0) |
| 2005–2007 | Plymouth Argyle | 37 | (0) |
| 2007 | → Grays Athletic (loan) | 6 | (0) |
| 2007–2011 | Lewes | 110 | (0) |
| Total | | 385 | (4) |
- * Club domestic league appearances and goals as of 12:41, 23 October 2010 (UTC)

Anthony Barness (born 25 February 1973) is an English former professional footballer who played as a defender from 1991 until 2011.

He notably played in the Premier League for Chelsea, Charlton Athletic and Bolton Wanderers and in the Football League for Middlesbrough, Southend United and Plymouth Argyle. He also played non-League football for Grays Athletic and Lewes.

== Career ==
Born in Lewisham, England, Barness started out as a trainee for Charlton Athletic. In his first spell at Charlton he scored Charlton's opening riposte after going 3–0 down at Newcastle, this strike was the goal of the match. Charlton went on to win the match 3–4 and this has been voted in the top 20 Charlton matches of all time.

His potential was spotted by a youth-scouting Chelsea side in 1992 and signed for £350,000— though some have said Chelsea only signed Barness after failing to sign his teammate, Scott Minto. During the four years which he spent at the club however, his chances of league starts were taken away from him at every possible opportunity. Thus, after just nineteen appearances in four years, he was loaned out to Middlesbrough (in August 1993) and Southend United (in February 1996).

Barness left Chelsea in August 1996, and returned to Charlton Athletic for a fee of £165,000. He was an important and regular part of the Charlton team, managed by Alan Curbishley. In his first season back at The Valley, he was a virtual ever present and a top performer in a Charlton side struggling after the sale of Lee Bowyer. Barness suddenly left the first team in 1997 being replaced by Mark Bowen at left back and occasionally Paul Konchesky, and only made a handful of appearances from then on many at right back. Although Mark Bowen was an excellent performer for Charlton in the 97/98 season, many Charlton fans were perplexed by Anthony's replacement as he'd been a very reliable player. Alan Curbishley was quoted at the time of dropping him, that he'd been virtually ever present the previous season and appeared close to burn out. Though the fans saw a minimal drop off in form, it retains a mystery why he fell out of favour with Alan Curbishley.

On the move again in 2000, he went to Bolton Wanderers on a free transfer deal and was initially a regular starter in Lancashire, but was soon relegated to starting only in Cup competitions – which manager Sam Allardyce often left to the second team. In his second year Barness made the right-back position his own, and became a fans favourite due to his effort for the cause. Barness continued to play for the first team over the next couple of years. He was set to move on loan to West Ham United in February 2004 but was recalled within 24 hours after Bolton suffered an injury crisis. He then played a vital role for Bolton as they set a record for the most consecutive wins by their club.

After being released by Bolton in May 2005, he joined Championship side Plymouth Argyle on a free transfer the following month. He impressed fans with solid performances throughout his first season with Argyle. He was released from his contract at Plymouth by manager Ian Holloway on 30 January 2007.

In February 2007, he had a trial with Yeovil Town. In March 2007, Barness signed for Grays Athletic until the end of the season, leaving two months later.

In August 2007 he signed for then Conference South side Lewes. Since then, Barness has remained an integral part of the first team squad. He was the only first team player to remain at Lewes after the controversial sacking of Steve King and the appointment of Kevin Keehan.

== Personal life ==
Barness retired at the end of the 2010–11 season to concentrate on his ceramic tiling business. Barness has two daughters, Kate and Isabel.

== Career statistics ==
(as of 13 September 2006)

| Club | Season | League | | FA Cup | | League Cup | | Total | |
| Club | Season | Apps | Goals | Apps | Goals | Apps | Goals | Apps | Goals |
| Charlton Athletic | 1991–92 | 22 (0) | 1 | 3 (0) | — | 2 (0) | — | 27 (0) | 1 |
| Charlton Athletic | 1992–93 | 5 (0) | — | — | — | — | — | 5 (0) | — |
| Charlton Athletic | Total | 27 (0) | 1 | 3 (0) | — | 2 (0) | — | 32 (0) | 1 |
| Chelsea | 1992–93 | 2 (0) | — | — | — | — | — | 2 (0) | — |
| Chelsea | 1993–94 | 13 (2) | — | — | — | 1 (0) | — | 14 (2) | — |
| Chelsea | 1994–95 | 0 (0) | — | — | — | — | — | 0 (0) | — |
| Chelsea | 1995–96 | — | — | — | — | 1 (0) | — | 1 (0) | — |
| Chelsea | Total | 15 (2) | — | — | — | 2 (0) | — | 17 (2) | — |
| Southend United (On Loan) | 1995–96 | 5 (0) | — | — | — | — | — | 5 (0) | — |
| Southend United (On Loan) | Total | 5 (0) | — | — | — | — | — | 5 (0) | — |
| Charlton Athletic | 1996–97 | 45 (0) | 2 | 2 (0) | — | 4 (0) | — | 51 (0) | 2 |
| Charlton Athletic | 1997–98 | 22 (8) | 1 | 0 (1) | — | 1 (0) | — | 23 (9) | 1 |
| Charlton Athletic | 1998–99 | 0 (3) | — | — | — | — | — | 0 (3) | — |
| Charlton Athletic | 1999–00 | 17 (2) | — | 1 (0) | — | — | — | 18 (2) | — |
| Charlton Athletic | Total | 84 (13) | 3 | 3 (1) | — | 5 (0) | — | 92 (16) | 3 |
| Bolton Wanderers | 2000–01 | 20 (3) | — | 2 (0) | — | 2 (0) | — | 24 (3) | — |
| Bolton Wanderers | 2001–02 | 19 (6) | — | 2 (0) | — | 2 (0) | — | 23 (6) | — |
| Bolton Wanderers | 2002–03 | 21 (4) | — | 1 (0) | — | — | — | 22 (4) | — |
| Bolton Wanderers | 2003–04 | 11 (4) | — | 2 (0) | — | 4 (2) | — | 17 (6) | — |
| Bolton Wanderers | 2004–05 | 5 (3) | — | 0 (2) | — | 1 (0) | — | 6 (5) | — |
| Bolton Wanderers | Total | 76 (20) | — | 7 (2) | — | 9 (2) | — | 92 (24) | — |
| Plymouth Argyle | 2005–06 | 33 (3) | — | 1 (0) | — | 2 (0) | — | 36 (3) | — |
| Plymouth Argyle | 2006–07 | 1 (0) | — | — | — | 1 | — | 2 (0) | — |
| Plymouth Argyle | Total | 34 (3) | — | 1 (0) | — | 3 (0) | — | 38 (3) | — |
| Career Total | | 245 (38) | 4 | 14 (3) | — | 21 (2) | — | 280 (45) | 4 |

== Honours ==
Charlton Athletic

- Football League First Division: 1999–2000

Bolton Wanderers

- Football League First Division play-offs: 2001
- Football League Cup runner-up: 2003–04

Lewes

- Conference South: 2007–08
