= 1974 in association football =

The following are the football (soccer) events of the year 1974 throughout the world.

== Events ==
- The FIFA World Cup is held from June 12 to July 7 in West Germany. West Germany wins its second title, defeating much favored Netherlands 2–1 in the final. Surprisingly, Poland take 3rd after defeating Brazil 1–0.
- European Cup: Bayern Munich beats Atlético Madrid 4–0 in the final. This was the first German EC win.
- UEFA Cup: Feyenoord wins 2–1 (Away) and 2–0 (Home) in the final against Tottenham Hotspur, winning the cup for the first time.
- UEFA Cup Winners Cup: 1. FC Magdeburg wins 2–0 over AC Milan, winning the cup for the first time. This also marks the only instance of an East German club winning a European title.
- Copa Libertadores 1974: Won by Independiente after defeating São Paulo Futebol Clube on an aggregate score of 1–0.
- February 17 – Zamalek disaster, that occurred in Cairo, before a friendly match between Zamalek SC & Dukla Prague.
- May 1 – PSV Eindhoven claims the Dutch Cup by defeating title holders NAC Breda: 6–0.
- September 18 – Dutch club FC Amsterdam makes its European debut by defeating Malta's Hibernians F.C. 5–0 in the first round of the UEFA Cup, with two goals from Nico Jansen.

== Winners club national championship ==
=== Asia ===
- Qatar: Al-Sadd SC

=== Europe ===
- East Germany: Magdeburg
- England: Leeds United
- France: AS Saint-Étienne
- Hungary: Újpest FC
- Italy: Lazio
- Netherlands: Feyenoord
- Poland: Ruch Chorzów
- Scotland: Celtic
- Spain: Barcelona
- Turkey: Fenerbahçe
- West Germany: Bayern Munich
- Yugoslavia: Hajduk Split

=== North America ===
- Mexico: Cruz Azul
- United States / Canada:
  - Los Angeles Aztecs (NASL)

=== South America ===
- Argentina
  - Metropolitano – Newell's Old Boys
  - Nacional – San Lorenzo
- Brazil – Vasco da Gama

== International tournaments ==
- African Cup of Nations in Egypt (March 1 – 14 1974)
  1. Zaire
  2. Zambia
  3. Egypt
- 1974 British Home Championship (May 11–18, 1974)

Shared by England and Scotland

- FIFA World Cup in West Germany (June 13 – July 7, 1974)
  1. West Germany
  2. Netherlands
  3. Poland

== Births ==
- January 2 – Jason de Vos, Canadian soccer player and sportscaster
- January 6 – Daniel Cordone, Argentinian striker
- January 10 – Bob Peeters, Belgian footballer
- January 11 – Jens Nowotny, German footballer
- January 13 – Marios Kyriakou, retired Cypriot footballer
- January 20 – David Dei, Italian club footballer and coach
- January 22 – Jörg Böhme, German footballer
- January 31 – Bob Mulder, Dutch footballer
- February 8 – Mariusz Krzywda, Polish former professional footballer
- March 5 – Jens Jeremies, German footballer
- March 9 – Franz Calustro, Bolivian footballer
- March 14 – Mark Fish, South-African footballer
- March 30 – Tomislav Butina, Croatian footballer
- March 31 – Charis Nicolaou, Cypriot footballer
- April 6 – Robert Kovač, Croatian footballer
- May 19 – Leszek Pokładowski, Polish former professional footballer
- May 28 – Hans-Jörg Butt, German footballer
- May 31 – René Soller, retired Swiss footballer
- June 1 – Mirko Andrić, Serbian former professional footballer
- June 26 – Pablo Galdames, Chilean footballer
- July 27 – Alfonso Sánchez, Andorran footballer
- August 27 – Adriano da Cruz, retired Brazilian footballer
- August 28 – Oliver Glasner, Austrian football player and manager
- August 29 – Denis Caniza, Paraguayan footballer
- September 5 – Ivo Ulich, Czech footballer
- September 7 – Macamito (Paulo "Macamito" Macamo), Mozambican footballer
- September 16 – Fricson George, Ecuadorian footballer
- September 21 – Ruslan Shumskikh, former Russian professional footballer
- October 5 – Jeff Strasser, Luxembourgish footballer
- November 4 – Jérôme Leroy, French footballer
- November 9 – Alessandro Del Piero, Italian footballer
- November 10 – Igor Sypniewski, Polish footballer (died 2022)
- November 12 – Raúl Pareja, retired Spanish footballer
- November 16 – Paul Scholes, English footballer
- December 3 – Damiën Hertog, Dutch footballer
- December 12 – Franklin Anangonó, Ecuadorian footballer
- December 20 – Paul Linger, English club footballer
- December 22
  - Michael Barron, English club footballer, coach, and manager
  - Dani García, Spanish international
- December 24 – Marcelo Salas, Chilean footballer
- December 29 – Nikolai Korovkin, Russian football coach and former player

== Deaths ==
=== March ===
- March 26 – Werner Kohlmeyer, West-German defender, winner of the 1954 FIFA World Cup. (49, heart failure)

=== June ===
- June 8 – Anfilogino Guarisi, Brazilian/Italian striker, winner of the 1934 FIFA World Cup and first ever Italian player to score in a FIFA World Cup qualification match. (68)
- June 13 – Ernesto Vidal, Uruguayan striker, winner of the 1950 FIFA World Cup. (52)

=== July ===
- July 1 – Kick Smit, Dutch footballer. (62)

=== September ===
- 7 September – Juan Antonio Ipiña (62), Spanish footballer
- 24 September – Canhoteiro (41), Brazilian striker, winner of the Pequena Taça do Mundo of 1955.

=== October ===
- October 28 – Everaldo, Brazilian left back, winner of the 1970 FIFA World Cup and active player of Grêmio Foot-Ball Porto Alegrense . (30; car crash)
