= Andrić =

Andrić (Serbo-Croatian pronunciation: [ǎːŋdrit͡ɕ]) is a Croatian and Serbian surname, derived from Andrija. Notable people with the surname include:

- Aleksandra Andrić (born 2008), Serbian judoka
- Dragan Andrić (born 1962), former Yugoslav water poloist
- Dragan Andrić (born 1975), Serbian politician
- Dragan Andrić (born 1989), Serbian footballer
- Dragan "Andra" Andrić (fl. 1980–1998), former bass guitar player of the Serbian band Piloti
- Dušan Andrić (born 1946), former Yugoslav footballer
- Ivo Andrić (1892–1975), Yugoslav novelist and Nobel laureate
- Ivo Andrić-Lužanski (born 1956), Bosnian Croat politician
- Klara Andric (born 1981), Austrian politician
- Komnen Andrić (born 1995), Serbian footballer
- Lukša Andrić (born 1985), Croatian basketball player
- Mario Andric (born 1998), Austrian footballer
- Mihajlo Andrić (born 1994), Serbian basketball player
- Mila Andrić (born 1990), Serbian hurdler
- Miodrag Andrić (1943–1989), Serbian actor
- Mirko Andrić (born 1976), Serbian footballer
- Nemanja Andrić (born 1987), Serbian footballer
- Nikola Andrić (1867–1942), Croatian writer, philologist and translator.
- Nikola Andrić (born 1992), Serbian footballer
- Srđan Andrić (born 1980), Croatian footballer
- Stefan Andrić (born 1996), Serbian-born Macedonian footballer
- Vicko Andrić (1793–1866), Croatian architect
- Viktor Andrić (born 1958), formerly known as Ivica Rajić, Croatian military officer and convicted war criminal
- Vjekoslav Andrić (born 1992), Slovenian footballer

== See also ==
- Andrew § South Slavic surnames
