= 2005–06 FC Crotone season =

F.C. Crotone
2005–06 season
- Chairman: Raffaele Vrenna
- Head coach: Gian Piero Gasperini
- Stadium: Stadio Ezio Scida
- Serie B: 9th
- Coppa Italia: Second round

The 2005–06 season was the 96th season in the existence of F.C. Crotone and the club's second consecutive season in the second division of Italian football. In addition to the domestic league, Crotone participated in this season's edition of the Coppa Italia.

== Players ==
=== First-team squad ===
Note: Flags indicate national team as defined under FIFA eligibility rules; some limited exceptions apply. Players may hold more than one non-FIFA nationality.

No.	Pos.	Nation	Player
1	GK	ITA	David Dei
2	DF	MAR	Jamal Alioui
2	DF	BRA	Ângelo
3	DF	ITA	Francesco Scardina
4	MF	ITA	Alfredo Cardinale
5	DF	ITA	Francesco Rossi
6	MF	ITA	Ferdinando Giuliano
6	DF	ITA	Simone Paolo Puleo
7	MF	FRA	Sébastien Piocelle
8	GK	ITA	Salvatore Soviero
9	FW	ITA	Nello Russo
9	FW	ITA	Graziano Pellè
10	FW	ITA	Nazzareno Tarantino
11	DF	FRA	Abdoulay Konko
13	FW	CZE	Jaroslav Šedivec
15	MF	ITA	Andrea Gentile
16	GK	ITA	Ilario Lamberti
17	GK	ITA	Rosario Cosimo
18	MF	ITA	Antonio Galardo
19	DF	ITA	Antonio Scerbo
20	FW	PAR	Tomás Guzmán

No.	Pos.	Nation	Player
20	FW	UZB	Ilyos Zeytullayev
21	DF	ITA	Gennaro Scarlato
22	FW	ITA	Giuseppe Turano
23	FW	ITA	Nicola Ferrari
24	DF	ITA	Domenico Maietta
25	DF	ITA	Pier Luigi Borghetti
26	DF	ITA	Giovanni Paschetta
27	FW	BRA	Jeda
28	MF	CRO	Ivan Jurić
44	MF	ITA	Giampaolo Ciarcià
50	MF	ITA	Stefano Vallone
58	FW	ITA	Simone Tambone
62	MF	ITA	Luca Scicchitano
77	MF	ITA	Andrea Gasperini
81	MF	BRA	Paquito
84	FW	ALG	Abdelkader Ghezzal
85	MF	ITA	Antonio Nocerino
86	DF	ITA	Emilio Scarriglia
86	MF	ITA	Raffaele Giove Laino
87	DF	ITA	Giuseppe Figliomeni

== Competitions ==
=== Overall record ===
Competition	First match	Last match	Starting round	Final position	Record							
Competition	First match	Last match	Starting round	Final position	Pld	W	D	L	GF	GA	GD	Win %
Serie B	4 September 2005	May 2006	Matchday 1	9th	42	18	9	15	56	48	+8	42.86
Coppa Italia	7 August 2005	14 August 2005	First round	Second round	2	1	0	1	4	3	+1	50.00
Total					44	19	9	16	60	51	+9	43.18

Last updated: May 2006
Source: Competitions

=== Serie B ===
==== League table ====
Pos	Team	Pld	W	D	L	GF	GA	GD	Pts
7	Arezzo	42	17	15	10	45	34	+11	66
8	Bologna	42	16	16	10	55	42	+13	64
9	Crotone	42	18	9	15	56	48	+8	63
10	Brescia	42	15	15	12	54	44	+10	60
11	Pescara	42	14	12	16	41	50	−9	54

Source: Almanacco Illustrato del Calcio 2007, Panini Edizioni, Modena, November 2006
Rules for classification: 1) points; 2) head-to-head points; 3) head-to-head goal difference; 4) head-to-head goals scored; 5) goal difference; 6) number of goals scored.

==== Results by round ====
Round	1	2	3	4	5	6	7	8	9	10	11	12	13	14	15	16
Ground	A	H	A	H	H	A	H	A	H	A	H	A	H	A	A	H
Result	L	W	L	W	L	D	W	W	D	L	W	D	D	D	D	L
Position																

Updated to match(es) played on May 2006. Source: Serie B
A = Away; H = Home; W = Win; D = Draw; L = Loss

==== Matches ====
7 September 2005 1	Arezzo	2–0	Crotone	Arezzo
--:-- CEST (UTC+2)

4 September 2005 2	Crotone	4–0	Piacenza	Crotone
--:-- CEST (UTC+2)

5 October 2005 3	Modena	1–0	Crotone	Modena
--:-- CEST (UTC+2)

10 September 2005 4	Crotone	2–1	Bari	Crotone
--:-- CEST (UTC+2)

16 September 2005 5	Crotone	0–2	Vicenza	Crotone
--:-- CEST (UTC+2)

20 September 2005 6	Torino	0–0	Crotone	Turin
--:-- CEST (UTC+2)

24 September 2005 7	Crotone	3–1	Catania	Crotone
--:-- CEST (UTC+2)

1 October 2005 8	Bologna	1–2	Crotone	Bologna
--:-- CEST (UTC+2)

9 October 2005 9	Crotone	1–1	Mantova	Crotone
--:-- CEST (UTC+2)

17 October 2005 10	Catanzaro	1–0	Crotone	Catanzaro
--:-- CEST (UTC+2)

22 October 2005 11	Crotone	1–0	Atalanta	Crotone
--:-- CEST (UTC+2)

26 October 2005 12	Cesena	0–0	Crotone	Cesena
--:-- CEST (UTC+2)

29 October 2005 13	Crotone	0–0	Pescara	Crotone
--:-- CEST (UTC+2)

5 November 2005 14	Hellas Verona	1–1	Crotone	Verona
--:-- CET (UTC+1)

13 November 2005 15	Ternana	1–1	Crotone	Terni
--:-- CET (UTC+1)

21 November 2005 16	Crotone	0–1	Rimini	Crotone
--:-- CET (UTC+1)
