= Korovkin =

Korovkin (Russian: Коровкин) is a Russian masculine surname, its feminine counterpart is Korovkina. It may refer to

- Michael Korovkin(born 1948), Russian-born Canadian/Italian academic and writer
- Nelli Korovkina (born 1989), Russian football player
- Nikita Korovkin (born 1983), Russian ice hockey defenceman
- Nikolai Korovkin (born 1974), Russian football player
- Pavel Korovkin (1913–1985), Russian mathematician
