= Alfonso Sánchez =

Alfonso Sánchez may refer to:

- Alfonso Sánchez Anaya (1941–2026), Mexican politician
- Alfonso Sánchez (Andorran footballer) (born 1974), Andorran football player
- Alfonso Sánchez Fernández (born 1978), Spanish actor and filmmaker
- Alfonso Sánchez Izquierdo (born 1949), Spanish journalist and broadcast executive
- Alfonso Sánchez Madariaga (1904–1999), Mexican trade unionist and politician
- Alfonso Sánchez Peña (1913–1997), Colombian prelate of the Roman Catholic Church, bishop of Montelíbano
- Alfonso Sánchez-Tabernero (born 1961), president of the University of Navarra
- Alfonso Sánchez Tinoco (1918–1970), Mexican prelate of the Roman Catholic Church, bishop of Papantla
- Alfonso Emilio Sánchez (born 1994), Mexican footballer
