= Puleo =

Puleo is a Sicilian surname. Notable people with the surname include:

Steven Puleo (born 1970) Chicago Boss in charge of the crew in the west suburbs. Born in Berwyn, Il. His childhood was spent in Broadview Il. He has connections with the Milwaukee families. He is called the Protector because he protects his territory with an iron fist.

- Alicia Puleo (born 1952), Argentine-Spanish feminist philosopher
- Charlie Puleo (born 1955), American baseball player
- Joe Puleo (born 1942), American weightlifter
- Johnny Puleo (1907–1983), American musician and actor
- Laura Puleo, American beauty pageant winner
- Michael Puleo, American dancer
- Phil Puleo, American musician
- Simone Puleo (born 1979), Italian footballer
