= Tabernero =

Tabernero is a Spanish-language occupational surname literally meaning "tavern keeper". Notable people with the surname include:

- Alfonso Sánchez-Tabernero
- Javier Martínez Tabernero
- Santiago Tabernero, (born 1961), Spanish film director and screenwriter
