= Le Bourgeois gentilhomme =

1670 comédie-ballet by Molière

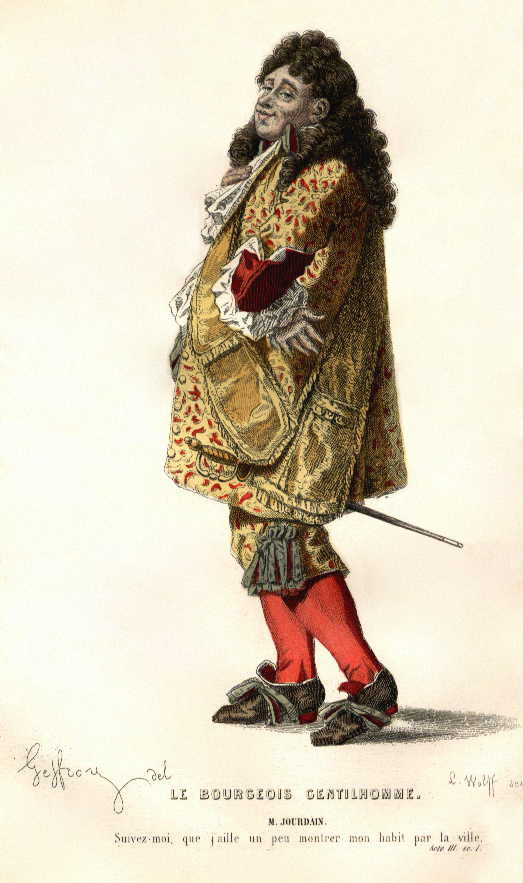
- Le Bourgeois gentilhomme
- Written by: Molière
- Music by: Jean-Baptiste Lully
- Characters: Monsieur Jourdain; Madame Jourdain; Lucile; Nicole; Cléonte; Covielle; Count Dorante; Marchioness Dorimène
- Original language: French; Sabir
- Subject: social climbing satire
- Genre: comédie-ballet
- Setting: Paris

Premiere
- Date premiered: October 14, 1670
- Place premiered: Château de Chambord; Versailles, France

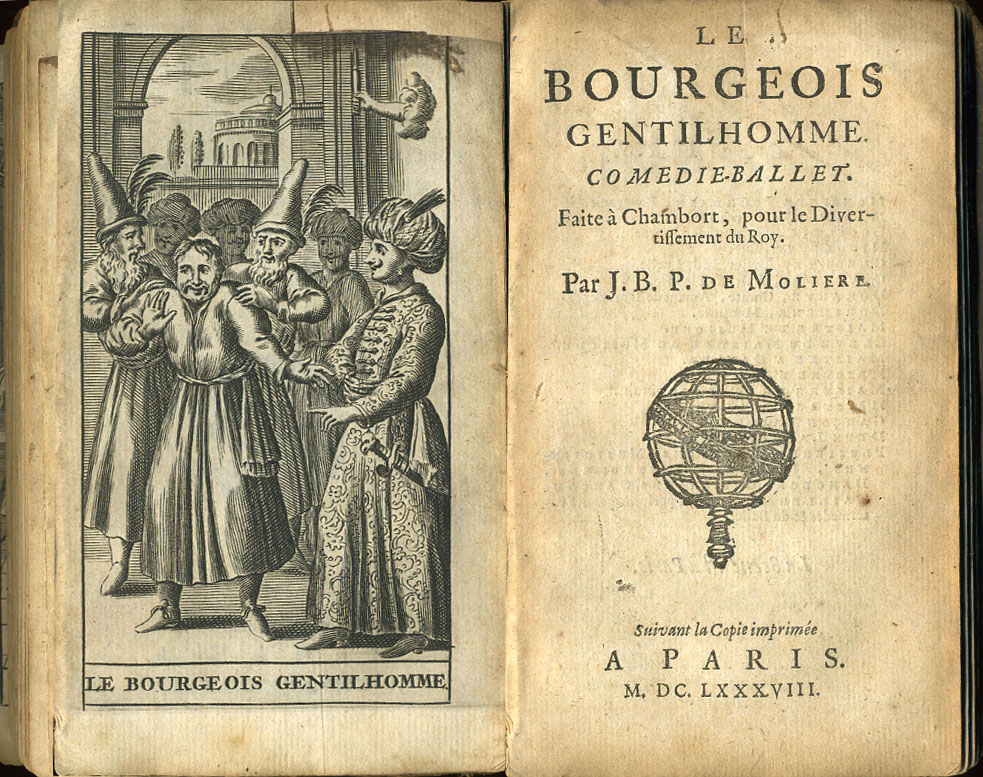
Frontispiece and title page of Le Bourgeois gentilhomme from a 1688 edition

Le Bourgeois gentilhomme (French pronunciation: [lə buʁʒwa ʒɑ̃tijɔm], variously translated as The Bourgeois Gentleman, The Middle-Class Aristocrat or The Would-Be Noble) is a five-act comédie-ballet — a play with music, dance and singing — first performed on 14 October 1670 for the court of Louis XIV at the Château of Chambord. Its text is by Molière, its music by Lully.

Molière's own troupe of actors gave the premiere; choreography was by Pierre Beauchamp, sets were by Carlo Vigarani and costumes by the Chevalier d’Arvieux. Public performances followed at the theatre of the Palais-Royal starting on 23 November 1670.

Le Bourgeois gentilhomme satirizes attempts at social climbing and the bourgeois personality, poking fun both at the vulgar, pretentious middle-class and the vain, snobbish aristocracy. The title is meant as an oxymoron: in Molière's France, a gentleman was by definition nobly born, and thus there could be no such thing as a bourgeois gentleman. The play is in prose (except for the ballet openings which are in verse).

== Synopsis ==
The play takes place at Mr. Jourdain's house in Paris. Jourdain is a middle-aged "bourgeois" whose father grew rich as a cloth merchant. The foolish Jourdain now has one aim in life, which is to rise above this middle-class background and be accepted as an aristocrat. To this end, he orders splendid new clothes and is very happy when the tailor's boy mockingly addresses him as "my Lord". He applies himself to learning the gentlemanly arts of fencing, dancing, music and philosophy, despite his age; in doing so he continually manages to make a fool of himself, to the disdain of the Dancing Master and the Music Master. His philosophy lesson becomes a basic lesson on language in which he is surprised and delighted to learn that he has been speaking prose all his life without knowing it.

Par ma foi ! il y a plus de quarante ans que je dis de la prose sans que j'en susse rien, et je vous suis le plus obligé du monde de m'avoir appris cela.

My faith! For more than forty years I have been speaking prose while knowing nothing of it, and I am the most obliged person in the world to you for telling me so.

Madame Jourdain, his intelligent wife, sees that he is making a fool of himself and urges him to return to his previous middle-class life, and to forget all he has learned. A cash-strapped nobleman called Dorante has attached himself to M. Jourdain. He secretly despises Jourdain but flatters his aristocratic dreams. For example, by telling Jourdain that he mentioned his name to the King at Versailles, he can get Jourdain to pay his debts. Jourdain's dreams of being upper-class go higher and higher. He dreams of marrying a Marchioness, Dorimène, and having his daughter Lucile marry a nobleman. But Lucile is in love with the middle-class Cléonte. Of course, M. Jourdain refuses his permission for Lucile to marry Cléonte.

Then Cléonte, with the assistance of his valet Covielle and Mme Jourdain, disguises himself and presents himself to Jourdain as the son of the Sultan of Turkey. Jourdain is taken in and is very pleased to have his daughter marry foreign royalty. He is even more delighted when the "Turkish prince" informs him that, as father of the bride, he too will be officially ennobled at a special ceremony. The play ends with this ridiculous ceremony, including the Sabir language standing in for Turkish.

== Performances ==
The original production brought together the finest actors and musicians of the time. Molière, aged 48, played the role of Monsieur Jourdain, clothed in bright colors trimmed with silver lace and multicolored feathers; André Hubert played Madame Jourdain (travesti); Mlle de Brie played Dorimène; Armande Béjart played Lucile; and the composer Jean-Baptiste Lully danced the mufti in the last act cérémonie des Turcs.

Le Bourgeois gentilhomme reflected the then-current trend for les turqueries, all things related to the Ottoman Empire. The work stemmed from the scandal caused by the Turkish ambassador Suleiman Aga who, upon visiting the court of Louis XIV in 1669, affirmed the superiority of the Ottoman court over that of the Sun King.

1. Ouverture

2. Gravement

3. Sarabande

4. Bourée

5. Gaillarde Canarie

6. Gavotte

7. Loure

8. Air des Espagnoles

9. Menuet 1 and 2

10. Chaconne des Scaramouche, Trivelins

11. Marche pour la Ceremonie des Turcs
Performed by the Advent Chamber Orchestra

The first performance of Der Bürger als Edelmann, a German version of the play, took place on 25 October 1912, adapted by Hugo von Hofmannsthal with incidental music by Richard Strauss. The turquerie was replaced by an appended operatic entertainment Ariadne auf Naxos, composed by Strauss to a libretto by Hofmannsthal, in which Jourdain's eccentric requirements have led to Ariadne being marooned on a desert island where there just happens to be a commedia dell'arte troupe. The production was directed by Max Reinhardt. The combination of play and opera proved problematic. Hofmannsthal created a revised version of the play, reinstating the turquerie and removing the opera. Strauss provided further incidental music including some arrangements of Lully. Meanwhile, the entertainment was provided with a separate operatic prologue and this is the form in which Ariadne is now usually given.

George Balanchine choreographed a number of modern versions, from the 1930s to the 1970s, using Strauss's score. The first version was performed in 1932 by Wassily de Basil and René Blum's Ballet Russe de Monte-Carlo, featuring David Lichine and Tamara Toumanova, with sets by Alexandre Benois. In 1944, a new version of the ballet was performed by the second iteration of the Ballet Russe de Monte-Carlo, with Nicholas Magallanes (taking over for an injured Frederic Franklin), Maria Tallchief, and Nathalie Krassovska. The most well-known version, from 1979 for the New York City Opera, featured input from Jerome Robbins, who stepped in during a period of Balanchine's illness. Peter Martins also choreographed one scene near the end of the ballet. The production starred Jean-Pierre Bonnefoux, Patricia McBride, Rudolf Nureyev, Darla Hoover, Michael Puleo and students of the School of American Ballet.

In 2005 Le Poème Harmonique in collaboration with Benjamin Lazar (stage director) and Cécile Roussat (choreographer) presented Le Bourgeois gentilhomme at the Utrecht Baroque Festival. Informed by the musical and theatrical traditions of 17th century France, the production revived the musical and dance interludes originally scored by Jean-Baptiste Lully and the work was presented in its entirety. The wardrobe was notably bourgeois and ridiculous, evidently the intent of the directors to present Monsieur Jordain as a naive, stunned and yet vulnerable man new to the world of money and privilege "victim and architect of the action". The use of candlelight as the only lighting source on stage and a frontal performance style even during conversations between characters gave the production a distinctly baroque air and was well received. The 2005 production was the first ever since the play's first performance to render it in its entirety, as faithful as possible to the original score and script by Molière and Lully.

== Roles ==
- Monsieur Jourdain: a bourgeois
- Madame Jourdain: his wife
- Lucile: the daughter of Monsieur Jourdain
- Nicole: their maid
- Cléonte: suitor of Lucile
- Covielle: Cléonte's lackey and who takes an interest in Nicole
- Dorante: Count, suitor of Dorimène
- Dorimène: Marchioness, a widow
- Master of Philosophy
- Music Master
- Pupil of the Music Master
- Dancing Master
- Fencing Master
- Tailor
- Tailor's apprentice
- Two lackeys

Many male and female musicians, instrumentalists, dancers, cooks, tailor's apprentices, and others are needed for the interludes.

== Audio adaptations ==
An hour-long version adapted by Harry McFadden was broadcast on the NBC radio series Great Plays on December 18, 1938.
