= Figliomeni =

Figliomeni is an Italian surname. Notable people with the surname include:

- Domenic Figliomeni, Canadian boxer
- Giuseppe Figliomeni, Italian footballer
- Joseph Figliomeni, Canadian lawyer
- Angelo Figliomeni, Canadian mobster
- Rocco Figliomeni, Italian restaurant owner
