= Dance Suite from Keyboard Pieces by François Couperin =

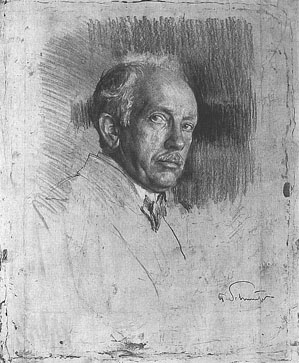
Schmutzer's Engraved portrait of Strauss, 1922

The orchestral Dance Suite from Keyboard Pieces by François Couperin (Tanzsuite aus Klavierstücken von François Couperin), TrV 245 was composed by Richard Strauss in 1923 and consists of eight movements, each one based on a selection of pieces from François Couperin's Pièces de Clavecin written for the solo harpsichord over the period 1713 to 1730. It is also sometimes referred to as simply The Couperin Suite.

== Composition history ==
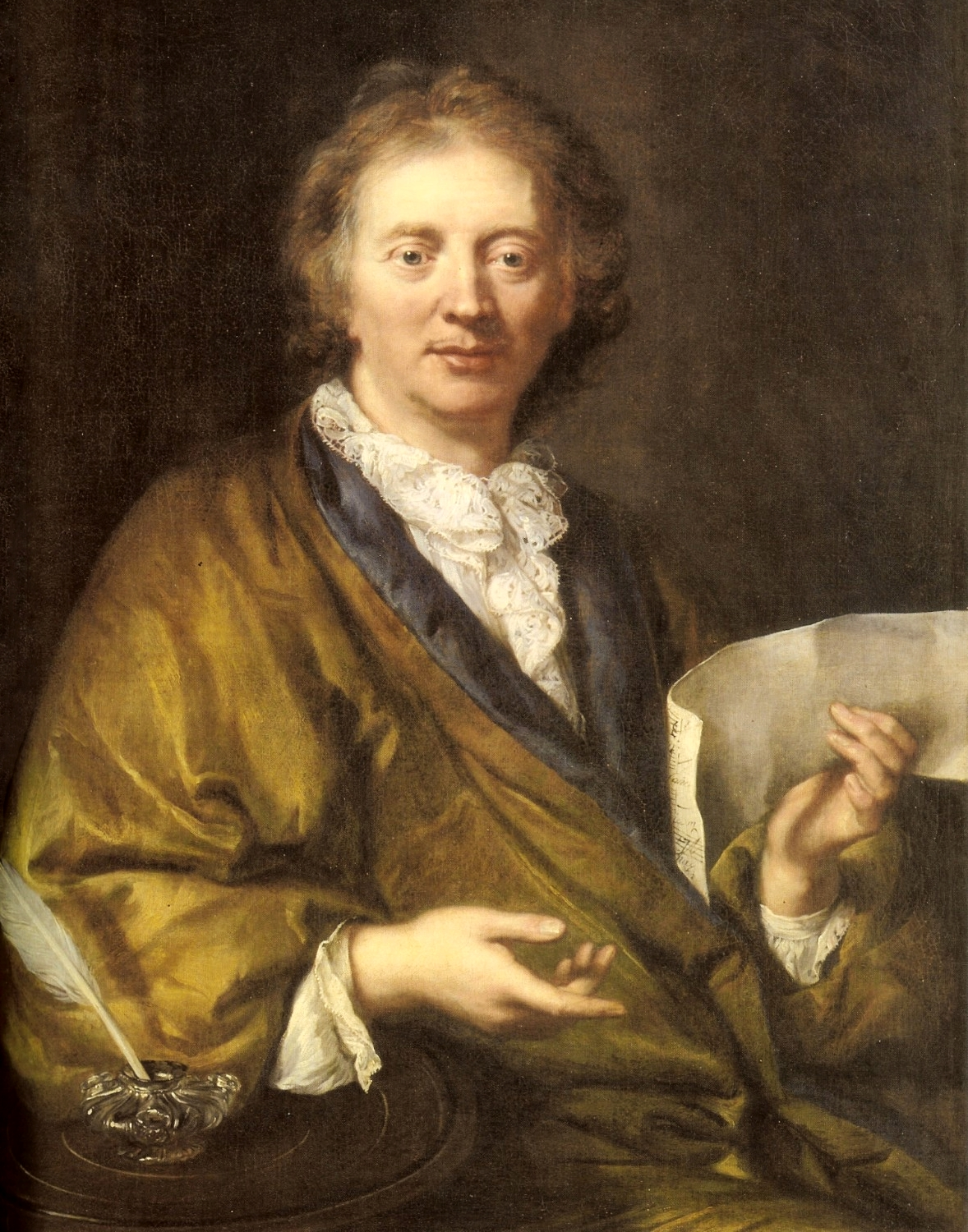
François Couperin, (1668–1733). Anonymous artist, Collection of the Château de Versailles.

The origins of the Dance Suite arose out of the collaboration of Strauss with Heinrich Kröller (1880–1930) who had choreographed Strauss' ballet Josephslegende for its 1921 Berlin premier. The arrangements by Strauss of Couperin's keyboard pieces were part of a "Ballettsoirée" (ballet evening) which premiered on 17 February 1923 (as part of the Vienna Fasching or carnival), which consisted of four parts. Part 1 was François Couperin: social and theatrical dances in the manner of Louis XV based on books 1–4 of Couperin's Pièces de Clavecin (composed over the period 1713 to 1730). Part 2 was Maurice Ravel's Mother Goose which made its Viennese premier (with Ravel's orchestration). Part 3 was a selection of Rameau's music titled The Ballerina's suitors: a dance scene in Ballet style from the time of Louis XIV (it is not known if the music was arranged for the modern orchestra, and if so by whom). The evening concluded (as it had to) with part 4 entitled "Galloppwalzer" by Vienna's very own Johann Strauss II, consisting of the Tritsch-Tratsch-Polka Op. 214 followed by the Accelerationen-Walzer Op.234. This was "pure dance display" evoking the Vienna of the "Ringstrasse era" (1858-1900).

As co-director of the Vienna opera, Strauss had collaborated closely with Kröller in selecting the music for the "Ballet evening". However, Strauss's main role was selecting and orchestrating the Couperin keyboard pieces. Strauss had long been a Francophone and he had a longstanding interest in French music. In his work on Ariadne auf Naxos and Le bourgeois gentilhomme suite he had "appropriated and reinterpreted" music from the French Baroque (Jean-Baptiste Lully in particular).

The music he had arranged for the Ballettsoirée was published as his Tanzsuite aus Klavierstücken von François Couperin, (TrV 245) in 1923 (Strauss did not give it an opus number). Each piece in the Dance suite is based on two or more of Couperin's keyboard pieces, except for the final march which is based on a single piece. The grouping of the pieces reflects the needs of the Ballet. Whilst the orchestration retains the period feel (for example, the ornamentation), the Ballet suggested more recent combinations of instruments: for example the opening section of the Carillon is arranged for Glockenspiel, Celesta, Harp and Harpsichord which is more suggestive of a Tchaikovsky ballet than the French Baroque. Strauss also composed codas to end several of the movements. "Strauss seems to have made a purposeful attempt to integrate the past and the 1923 present, whereby his Tanzesuite has a special relationship to canonized neoclassicism".

== Performance history ==
The complete Balletsoirée was performed only twice, once on 17 February 1923 conducted by Clemens Krauss and again in Vienna on 25 July 1929. However, the dance suite took on a life of its own, often under the title "Couperin Suite", both as a concert piece and as a stand-alone short ballet. The ballet had its German premiere at Darmstadt on 24 March 1924, and at the Dresden Opera in 1930. Subsequent performances with new choreography were put on in Vienna (1944, 1970), Bayreuth and Munich (1951), Dresden (2014). Part of the Dance suite was used for the music to go with the 1926 silent film Der Rosenkavalier which was performed several times in Germany, London and New York.

Strauss returned to Couperin and wrote a second suite Divertimento for Chamber Orchestra after Keyboard Pieces by Couperin, Op. 86 which was published in 1942. This contained additional material Strauss had written for a ballet Verklungene Feste: Tanzvisionen aus zwei Jahrhunderten (Bygone Celebrations: Dance Visions from Two Centuries) in 1940.

== Source of each movement ==
	Strauss Suite	Score	Source in Couperin (Book, order, piece)
I	Einzug und feierlicher Reigen (Pavanne)		1. Les Graces incomparable, ou le Conti (3,16,1); 2. La Superbe, ou le Forqueray (3,17,1)
II	Courante		1. Premier Courante (1,1,2); 2. Seconde Courante (1,1,3); 3. Les Nonetes (1,1,13)
III	Carillon		1. Le Carillon de Cithere (3,14,6); 2. L'Evaporee (3,15,3)
IV	Sarabande		1. Sarabande: La Majestueuse (1,1,4); 2. Les sentimens, sarabande (1,1,11)
V	Gavotte		1. La Fileuse (2,12,6); 2. Gavotte (4,26,2); 3. Les sartires, chevre pieds (seconde partie) (4,23,5); 4. La bourbonnoise, gavotte (1,1,14); 5. La Princesse Marie (premier partie) (4,20,1)
VI	Wirbeltanz		1. Le Turbulent 3,18,4); 2. Le petits moulins a vent (3,17,2); 3. Les tricoteuses (4,23,2)
VII	Allemande und Menuett		1. Allemande a deux clavecins (2,9,1); 2. Les charmes (2,9,3)
VIII	Marsch		1. Les matelots provencales (Premier partie) (1,3,11)
	Source: Norman Del Mar (vol. 2, p. 277); Heisler, pp 109–10)		

Couperin's collection of solo harpsichord pieces (pièces de clavecin) is organized into 25 suites for which Couperin used the term "ordre" in the sense of "sequence". Each sequence consists of several pieces, with a title for each piece. Depending on the publisher, these are also divided into volumes. However, the original publication was in four volumes (volume 1 published in 1713 contains sequences 1–5, volume 2 published in 1717 contains sequences 6–12, volume 3 published in 1722 contains sequences 13–19, volume 4 published in 1730 contains sequences 20–25). In the second column the name of the piece is given followed by three numbers: first the "livre" or volume in which it was originally published; second the "ordre" or sequence in which it occurs; thirdly its position in this sequence. For example, the 8th movement of the dance suite "Marsch" comes from "Les matelots provençals" the 11th piece in sequence 3 contained in volume 1.

== Instrumentation ==
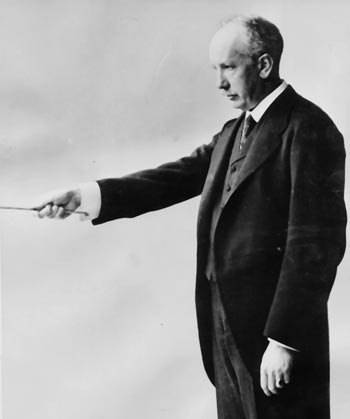
Strauss the conductor, around 1924

The dance suite uses a chamber orchestra with the following instrumentation:

- 2 flutes, oboe, cor anglais (oboe), 2 clarinets, 2 bassoons
- 2 horns, trumpet, trombone
- Glockenspiel
- Harpsichord, harp, celesta
- Strings 4, 3, 2, 2, 2

== Recordings ==
There have been several recordings of this piece, including:

CD title (release date)	Orchestra and conductor	Reference
Richard Strauss - Komponist, Dirigent, Pianist und Klavierbegleiter, Volume 3 (2010)	Vienna Philharmonic, Richard Strauss	Documents 291373
Tanzsuite aus Klavierstücken von François Couperin (2006)	Chamber Orchestra of Europe, Erich Leinsdorf	COE Records – CDCOE809
Richard Strauss: Complete Tone Poems and Concertos (2014)	Sinfonietta de Montréal, Charles Dutoit	Decca Collectors Edition – 4786480
Ballet Suites after Couperin (1999)	Bamberg Symphony, Karl Anton Rickenbacher	Koch – 365352
R. Strauss: Complete Orchestral Works (remaster 2014)	Staatskapelle Dresden, Rudolf Kempe	Warner Classics – 4317802
Strauss: Verklungene Feste / Tanzsuite / Divertimento. (1993)	Tokyo Metropolitan Symphony Orchestra, Hiroshi Wakasugi	Denon Records B00000DT02

The recording with Strauss conducting the Vienna Philharmonic was made in 1944 as part of his 80th birthday celebrations.

== Sources ==
- Wayne Heisler Jr., The Ballet Collaborations of Richard Strauss, University of Rochester Press, 2009. ISBN 978-1-58046-321-8
- Norman Del Mar, Richard Strauss: a critical commentary on his life and works (second edition), Volume 2. Faber and Faber, London (1986). ISBN 978-0-571-25097-4.
