= Le bourgeois gentilhomme (Strauss) =

Orchestral suite

- orchestral suite by Richard Strauss
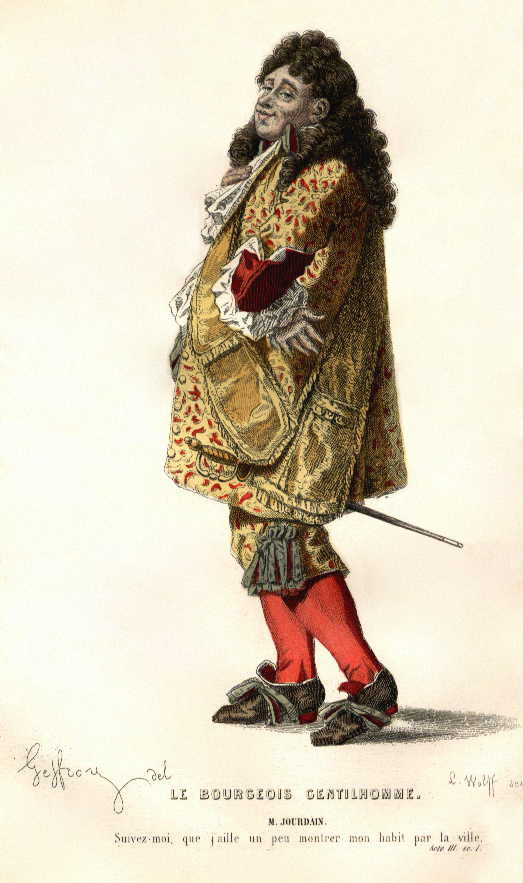
- M. Jourdain, Le bourgeois gentilhomme, the title character in the play.
- English: The merchant gentleman
- Catalogue: TrV 228c
- Opus: 60
- Composed: 25 December 1917
- Scoring: Chamber orchestra

Premiere
- Date: April 9, 1918

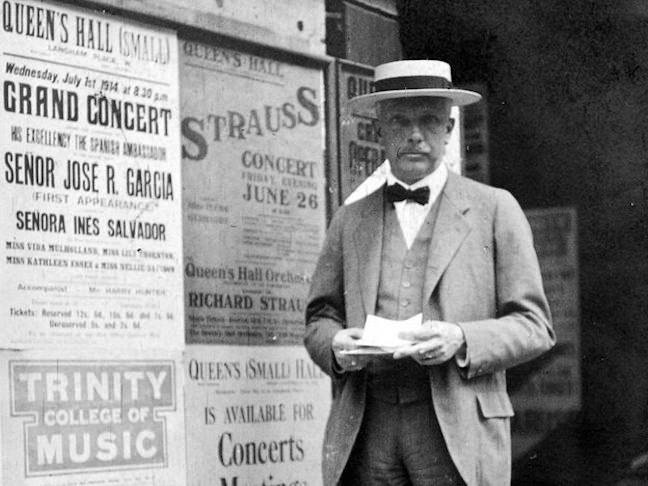
Strauss in London, June 1914 after receiving his honorary Doctorate from Oxford University

Le bourgeois gentilhomme (in German, Der Bürger als Edelmann), Op. 60, is an orchestral suite compiled by Richard Strauss from music he wrote between 1911 and 1917.

The work has a complex genesis. Originally, Strauss's collaborator Hugo von Hofmannsthal had the idea of reviving Molière's 1670 play Le bourgeois gentilhomme, simplifying its plot, introducing a commedia dell'arte troupe, adding incidental music, and concluding what would be a long evening with a newly written one-act opera called Ariadne auf Naxos. This idea did materialize, as planned, in Stuttgart on 25 October 1912. But it was apparent that the result was too long and expensive and that many in the audience for the play were uninterested in the opera, and vice versa. Strauss and Hofmannsthal accordingly opted to separate the two works entirely. In the case of the opera, this meant Strauss composing a new “Prologue” for it to explain the presence of the comedians. (The revised Ariadne auf Naxos premiered four years later and has been a success ever since.) As regards the play, Hofmannsthal devised an ending closer to Molière's original, with Strauss adding to his existing incidental music to support the new conclusion. This premiered in 1917.

An adaptation of Moliere's play by Peter Ustinov was presented and recorded in 1997 with Ustinov narrating and playing the parts, incorporating Strauss's music.

It was from the now-lengthened incidental music that Strauss compiled his orchestral suite. He finished this task on Christmas Day 1917, and the resulting concert work received its premiere in Berlin on 9 April 1918 with Strauss himself conducting. The suite lasts half an hour and is in nine sections:

1. Ouverture (Overture)
2. Menuett (Minuet)
3. Der Fechtmeister (The Fencing Master)
4. Auftritt und Tanz der Schneider (Entry and Dance of the Tailors)
5. Menuett des Lully (Lully's Minuet)
6. Courante
7. Auftritt des Cléonte (Entry of Cléonte; after Lully)
8. Vorspiel (Intermezzo)
9. Das Diner (The Dinner)

Omitted from the suite were ballets added for the 1917 version of the play: one for sylphs, another for pretend-Turks. Strauss's Opus 60 is unusual among his works in having a distinct baroque flavor. In fact he based sections 5 to 7 on music by Jean-Baptiste Lully, who had provided the original incidental music in 1670 and was as much a collaborator with Molière as Strauss and Hofmannsthal were centuries later. The few other so-called Neo-Classical works by Strauss also found inspiration in the French Baroque: his 1923 Dance suite after keyboard pieces by François Couperin and his 1942 Divertimento for chamber orchestra after keyboard pieces by Couperin, Opus 86.

== Instrumentation ==
- Woodwind: 2 flutes (1 doubling piccolo), 2 oboes (2 with English horn), 2 clarinets, 2 bassoons (2nd doubling contrabassoon)
- Brass: 2 horns, 1 trumpet, 1 bass trombone
- Percussion: timpani and 3 players playing cymbals, tambourine, triangle, bass drum, snare drum, glockenspiel
- Keyboard: piano
- Strings: harp, violins, violas, cellos, double basses

== Sources ==
- Program notes by Stephen Rose to Christopher Hogwood's recording with the Kammerorchester Basel (Arte Nova Classics 82876 61103-2)
- David Nice "Between Two Worlds" pp. 13–18 of the programme to the 2008 Royal Opera House production of Ariadne auf Naxos.
- Trenner, Franz. Richard Strauss Chronik, Verlag Dr Richard Strauss Gmbh, Wien, 2003. ISBN 3-901974-01-6.
