= Dragan Andrić =

Dragan Andrić may refer to:

- Dragan Andrić (politician) (born 1975), Serbian politician
- Dragan Andrić (footballer) (born 1989), Serbian footballer
- Dragan Andrić (water polo) (born 1962), Serbian water polo player
- Dragan Andrić "Andra", former bass guitar player of the Serbian band Piloti
