= Korovkin approximation =

In mathematics the Korovkin approximation is a convergence statement in which the approximation of a function is given by a certain sequence of functions. In practice a continuous function can be approximated by polynomials. Korovkin approximation theory provides a way to establish the convergence of a sequence of positive linear operators on a function space by examining its convergence on a finite set of test functions. The Korovkin approximation is named after Pavel Korovkin.
