= Leszek Pokładowski =

Polish footballer

Personal information
- Date of birth: 19 May 1974 (age 52)
- Place of birth: Bytów, Poland
- Height: 1.75 m (5 ft 9 in)
- Position: Defender

Youth career
- Grom Studzienice
- Baszta Bytów

Senior career*
Years	Team	Apps	(Gls)
1992–1993	Baszta Bytów		
1993–2002	Pogoń Szczecin		
2003–2004	GKS Bełchatów	26	(0)
2004	Kujawiak Włocławek		
2004–2005	Ruch Chorzów	27	(0)
2005–2007	SV 07 Eschwege		
2007–2008	Pasewalker FV		
- * Club domestic league appearances and goals

Leszek Pokładowski (born 19 May 1974) is a Polish former professional footballer who played as a defender.
