= Michael Korovkin =

Russian anthropologist (born 1948)

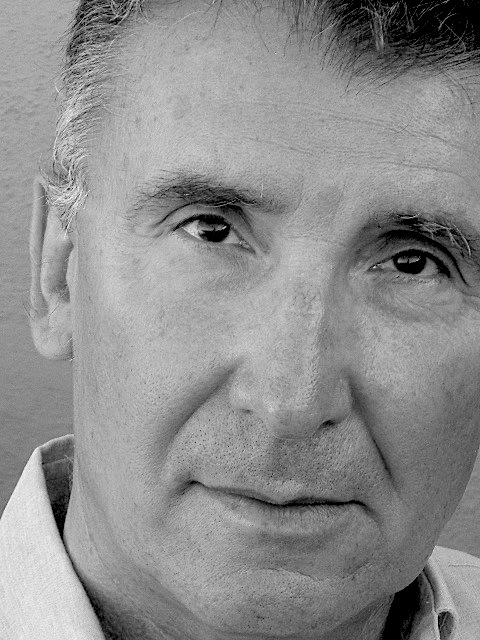
Michael Korovkin

Michael Korovkin (born December 28, 1948, in Russia) is a socio-cultural anthropologist, novelist and poet. He began as a neuro-physiologist in Russia and after emigrating in 1976 he went on to study anthropology in Canada, England and the Netherlands. His academic work focuses on medical anthropology and European and Mediterranean studies. His literary work covers a diverse range of socio-cultural milieus and psychological perspectives, extending cultured and incisive insights into the human condition. He has lived in Italy since 1989.

== Fields of research ==
Korovkin specializes in political and economic anthropology, symbolic expression and social organisation, and medical anthropology of stress. His articles have been published in journals that include Epistemology and Philosophy of Science (2011), European Journal of Sociology (1988), Comparative Studies in Society and History (1988), Language in Society (1987) and Current Anthropology (1986). Over the years, he has consulted on political and economic processes, power dynamics of social groupings and immigration policies for various government and private institutions, including the UN, both in Italy and Canada.

== Formation ==
In Russia Korovkin studied biology and medicine at the Moscow State Pedagogical University and at I.M. Sechenov First Moscow State Medical University. He specialised in neuro-physiology and during his internship he worked at the Burdenko Scientific Research Neurosurgery Institute in the department directed by his uncle, Prof. Samuel M. Blinkov, co-author of the seminal work The Human Brain in Figures and Tables (S.M Blinkov, I.I Glezer 1964).

After leaving Russia at the age of 27 he arrived to Canada where he studied cultural and social anthropology under Judith Nagata at York University. After winning a Doctoral Fellowship from Canada's Social Sciences and Humanities Research Council (SSHRC), he spent a year at the London School of Economics (LSE) and went on to complete his studies the University of Amsterdam School for Social Science Research under Jeremy Boissevain.

== Theoretical approach ==
In his anthropological work Korovkin's treatment of the socio-cultural process can be seen as a concerted effort to “reconcile the irreconcilable” namely – structuralism and phenomenology. This leads him to a “fractal approach” or to what he calls the quantum mechanics of symbols” by analogy with Heisenberg's principle of uncertainty where the more is known about the meaning of the symbol the less is known about its entity, and vice versa.

== Medical anthropology ==
In the field of medical anthropology Korovkin proposes his particular cross disciplinary “parabiotic” approach (i.e. Cannon, Richter, et al.) to coping with stress primarily in terms of its socio-cultural and physiological dynamics; teaching individuals and groups to develop analytical strategies of resilience and thus deal with stress competently rather than attempt to eliminate it (www.stressalternative.org). He is co-author with P. Stephenson of Zombie Factory: Culture, Stress & Sudden Death (2010). His treatment of stress falls within the canons of neuroanthropology: the anthropological aspect concerns primarily the role values play in the perception of stressors and somatisation of stress. The neuro-physiological treatment of the issue emphasises the patterns of stress rather than its intensity as a measurable physiological symptom.

== Academic career ==
Korovkin has taught social and medical anthropology in Canada at McMaster University, the University of British Columbia and the University of Victoria. At the end of the 1980s he settled in Italy where he taught at the University of Bari, University of Perugia, Tuscia University, and Libera Università Maria SS. Assunta (LUMSA) in Rome. He was Professor of Sociology and Communication Studies at ESE - European School of Economics, where he served as Academic Director from 2001 to 2004 at the Rome and Naples campuses. Currently he is Professor of Social Sciences at USAC - (University Studies Abroad Consortium).

== Literary work ==
In 1991, the late Indro Montanelli, Editor-in-Chief of the leading Italian national daily Il Giornale, offered Korovkin a column on the newspaper's cultural page Terza pagina. Montanelli was seeking to divulge a view on Russian political culture that would provoke a dialectical challenge to the “radical-chic” notions dominant among European intellectual elites. With this in mind, he approached Korovkin with a plan to publish a pseudo Samizdat, which Korovkin agreed to write. Montanelli sent him to Russia as a special envoy in order to gather ethnographical material for the job at hand. For both Korovkin and Montanelli this “editorial operation” was not merely a gratuitous literary scherzo: it fronted a well considered notion that they shared, but could hardly expect to present personally, both due to their known ideological stands (“elegant right” Montanelli and “elegant left” Korovkin) and their geographically vicarious position.

The idea sustaining the novel is that Russia is a culturally feudal and idiosyncratically monarchic society, loving to hate their strong czars and falling apart under the weak ones; where the "tyrant" is a necessary product, simulacrum and even an “existential victim” of his own subject-people. The novel's original title in English is Voice from the Orphanage: Memories of the Man Between Seasons. It is a sui generis rejoinder to what has been regarded as one of the first ever samizdat: A Voice from the Chorus (1976) by Abram Tertz (Andrei Sinyavsky). Korovkin's reverts Tertz’ thesis by presenting Russians as Stalin's post-Perestroika perestroika orphans as opposed to repressed mass victims (chorus) of the Soviet regime. He correctly predicts what he saw would be the inevitable return of a strong authoritarian ruler. Montanelli personally wrote the introduction thus giving the work an imprimatur of “authenticity”; it was serialised in Il Giornale, and became the object of widespread interest and debate. Upon publication by Sperling & Kupfer the work, titled Orfani di Madre-Russia; Memorie di un Cinico (1992) written under the pseudonym Vadim Dubrovski, became a national bestseller.

Following the success of “Orphans,” Korovkin was approached by the Italian publishing house Mondadori with a request to write another samizdat; this time the memories of a Moscow courtesan. Korovkin accepted the challenge, seeing the offer as an opportunity to write what he called “the first-ever feminist novel written by a man”. The novel, titled Dancing with Fat Cats: Memories of a Moscow Call Girl, was written in English under the pseudonym Lena Volgina. It was translated into Italian by the writer Stefania Pergola and published by Mondadori as Memorie di una maîtresse moscovita (1994). Later, it was to be published under the original title in Russian translation by Aletheia (St Petersburg, 2004), and then re-published in Moscow by AST Publishers as Diary of a Moscow Courtesan (2005). It came out to wide critical acclaim, but apart from Katerina Nistratova, critics treated it as anti-Soviet, while Korovkin himself intended it as primarily “anti-men”, with a Russian setting. The novel also provoked lively discussion on the Italian literary scene with Italian journalists eager to interview the mysterious maîtresse.

Notwithstanding the prestigious backing and successful initial promotion, the publication of the Korovkin's writings in Italy in the early 1990s proved untimely. This was the period when the nation underwent the clamorous fall of the First Republic as government corruption surfaced through the institutionalised graft scandal known as Tangentopoli ("Bribesville"). Thus, in the wake of the nation's moral upheaval further promotion of the “forged” novels was judiciously halted. Subsequently, however, he published other three novels in Russia under his own name: Once a Good Man and Short Stories (2001), Terms of Estrangement: Diaries of A Paratrooper (2002) and Excursion: Adventures of Modigliani the Ghost (2005).

== Critique ==
Korovkin is described as “a brilliant and ferocious poet whose furious, defiant but consistently classical and supremely elegant poetry, controlled and yet fluid, draws, without ever becoming heavy, on a very rich and varied cultural patrimony” (Franca Rovigatti, Roma Poesia 1998). His last book of poetry to-date is Fields of Vision: Selected Poems and The Soldier’s Tale (2014). It consists of 14 poems whose programmatic direction is best attested to by the title of the first piece of the volume: Looking for Faith. A large section of the book is occupied by The Soldier’s Tale: a completely new rendering of the fable used by Stravinsky for the homonymous suite and inspired by the latter. It bears the subtitle A Narcissus Variation — narcissism in contemporary society is a topic that Korovkin repeatedly turns to both in his poetry and prose.

In his poetic work, Korovkin often collaborates with American composer Jakov Jakoulov. He also intensively collaborates with Stephanie Morin. Currently they are working together on preparing for the publication of Morin's research for a book titled Gold Fish in a Blender: An Essay on Approaches to Communicating Contemporary Visual Art.

Picnic Area*
Unveiling strong secrets beyond the surfaces
Of a picnic area in the near-by woods
Enchanted by their own suburban plainness
All sins are swept under the carpet of autumn leafage

Hamburgers grill on the torturer’s grate
French fries sizzle in heretic oil
The sun shines on worn wooden benches
Where innocence no longer sits.

* © Michael Korovkin
Written expressly for Jakov Jakoulov’s “Sentient Webs”
(Stephanie Morin Sonata) for organ and cello.
First performed: Boston 2010
Published: University of Tuscia Press, Italy, 2012

== Academic books ==
- 1992: Patterns of Re-Engagement: Protestant Conversions in a Southern Italian Community (a monograph). Astrolabio-Ubaldini Editore, Rome.
- 1995: Reflections on Russian Proverbs: Translation, Understanding and the Principle of Uncertainty. Red Hill Press, Berkeley & Los Angeles.
- 2010: Zombie Factory: Culture, Stress & Sudden Death. with P. Stephenson, Green Frigate Press, Canada.

== Novels ==
- 1992: Dubrovski, Vadim. Orfani di Madre Russia: Diario di un Cinico, "Sperling & Kupfer", Milan.
- 1994: Volgina, Lena. Memorie di una maîtresse moscovita, Mondadori, Milan.
- 2001: Once a Good Man, Publishing House Hyperion, St. Petersburg.
- 2002: Terms of Estrangement: Diaries of a Paratrooper, Aletheia, St. Petersburg.
- 2003: Dancing With Fat Cats, Aletheia, St. Petersburg.
- 2005: Vospominania Moskovskoj Kurtizanki, AST, St. Petersburg.
- 2005: Excursion: Adventures of Modigliani the Ghost, Aletheia, St. Petersburg.

== Poetry ==
- 1994: Caught On the Line (Illustrated by S. Morin), Union Printing Publishers, Viterbo.
- 1996: Breviario (Illustrated by L Boille, T.Cascella, S. Morin), Juliet, Triest.
- 2012: All in One At Once (Four Paintings by S. Morin, compositions for pianoforte Jakov Jakoulov), University of Tuscia Press, Viterbo
- 2014: Fields of Vision; Selected Poems and The Soldier’s Tale Suite (Illustrated by S. Morin), Aletheia, St. Petersbrurg.
