= Macamito =

Mozambican footballer

Paulo "Macamito" Macamo (born 7 September 1974) is a Mozambican footballer currently playing for Maxaquene.His position is Midfielder.

== See also ==
- Football in Mozambique
- List of football clubs in Mozambique
