= Mario Andric =

Austrian association footballer

Personal information
- Date of birth: 4 March 1998 (age 28)
- Place of birth: Kufstein, Austria
- Height: 1.80 m (5 ft 11 in)
- Position: Left-back

Team information
- Current team: Kufstein
- Number: 22

Youth career
- 2004–2011: SV Thiersee
- 2011–2012: Kufstein
- 2012–2013: AKA Tirol
- 2013–2016: Red Bull Salzburg
- 2016–2017: Kaiserslautern

Senior career*
Years	Team	Apps	(Gls)
2017–2019	Kaiserslautern II	35	(2)
2019	Wuppertaler SV	6	(0)
2019–2020	Freiberg	19	(0)
2020–2021	Kufstein	15	(2)
2021–2022	Tirol II	11	(1)
2021–2022	Tirol	3	(0)
2022–	Kufstein	15	(2)
- * Club domestic league appearances and goals as of 6 November 2022

Mario Andric (born 4 March 1998) is an Austrian professional footballer who plays as a left-back for Kufstein.

== Career ==
Andric is a product of the youth academies of the Austrian clubs SV Thiersee, Kufstein, AKA Tirol, and Red Bull Salzburg, and the German club Kaiserslautern. He began his senior career with Kaiserslautern II in 2017. On 26 January 2019, he transferred to Wuppertaler SV. He moved back to Austria, with stints at Freiberg and Kufstein. On 17 May 2021, he transferred to WSG Tirol. He made his professional debut with WSG Tirol in a 2–1 Austrian Football Bundesliga loss to Austria Klagenfurt on 28 August 2021. He mutually terminated his contract with Tirol on 4 July 2022.
