= Mariusz Krzywda =

Polish footballer

Personal information
- Date of birth: 8 February 1974 (age 52)
- Place of birth: Nowy Sącz, Poland
- Height: 1.76 m (5 ft 9 in)
- Position: Midfielder

Youth career
- Bocheński KS

Senior career*
Years	Team	Apps	(Gls)
1991–1993	Igloopol Dębica		
1994–1996	Hutnik Kraków	53	(9)
1997	Jagiellonia Białystok		
1997–1998	Sandecja Nowy Sącz		
1998	Hutnik Kraków		
1999	MKS Mława		
1999–2000	Sandecja Nowy Sącz		
2000–2001	MG MZKS Kozienice		
2001–2008	Bocheński KS		
- * Club domestic league appearances and goals

Mariusz Krzywda (born 8 February 1974) is a Polish former professional footballer who played as a midfielder.
