= Paul Linger =

English footballer (1974–2021)

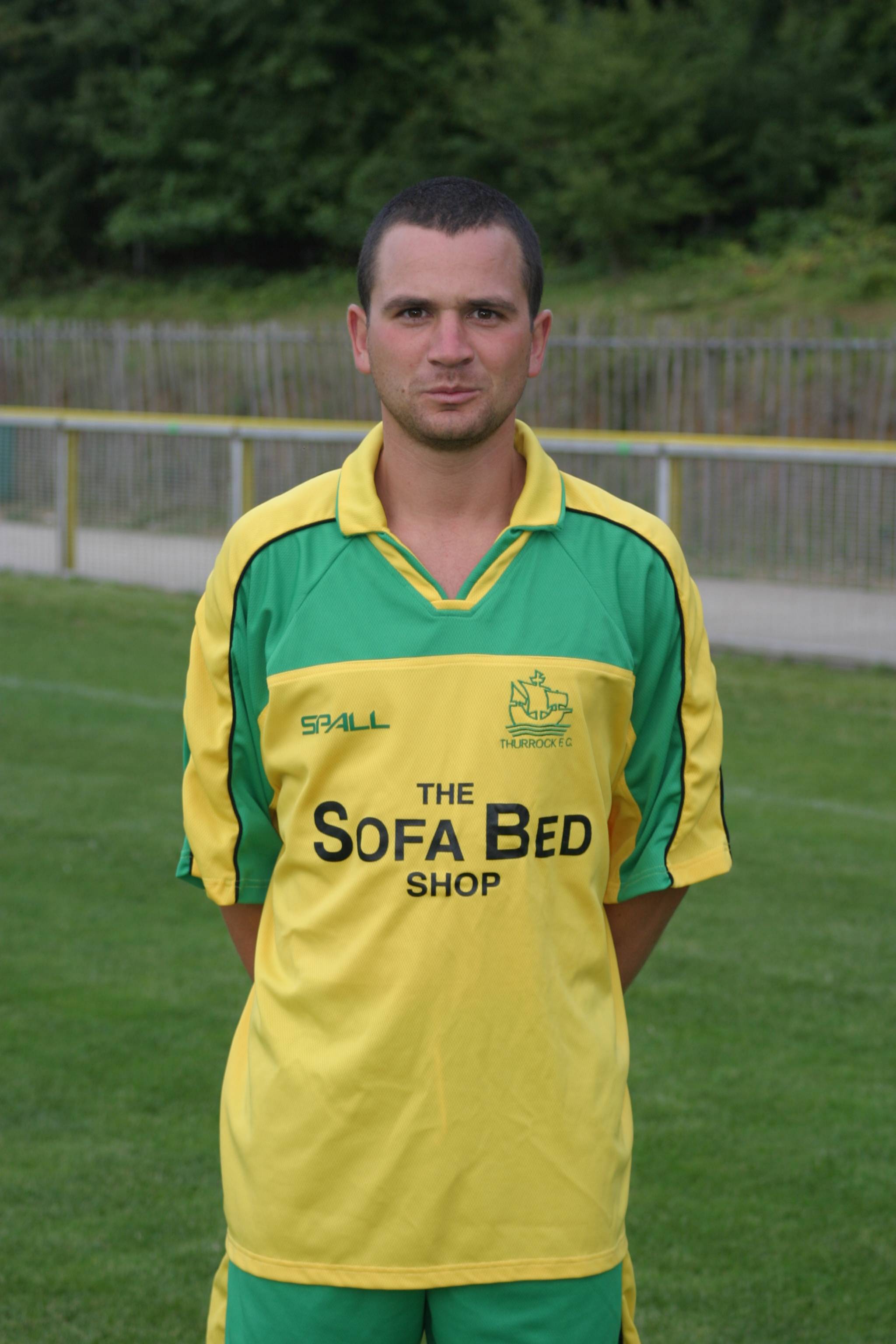
- Linger with Thurrock

Personal information
- Date of birth: 20 December 1974
- Place of birth: Stepney, England
- Date of death: 1 October 2021 (aged 46)
- Position: Midfielder

Youth career
- Charlton Athletic

Senior career*
Years	Team	Apps	(Gls)
1993–1997	Charlton Athletic	23	(1)
1997	Leyton Orient	3	(0)
1997–1998	Brighton & Hove Albion	20	(0)
1998–1999	Welling United		
1999–2001	Billericay Town		
–	→ Braintree Town (loan)		
2001–2004	Purfleet / Thurrock		
2004–2005	East Thurrock United		
2005–2006	Wingate & Finchley		
2006	Chelmsford City	4	(0)
2006–2007	Redbridge		
2007	Dover Athletic		
2011–2014	London Lions		
- * Club domestic league appearances and goals

Paul Linger (20 December 1974 – 1 October 2021) was an English professional footballer who played in the Football League as a midfielder for Charlton Athletic, Leyton Orient and Brighton & Hove Albion. He went on to play non-League football for clubs including Welling United, Billericay Town, Braintree Town, Purfleet/Thurrock, East Thurrock United, Wingate and Finchley, Chelmsford City, Redbridge, and Dover Athletic.

Linger represented the United Kingdom at the 2005 Maccabiah Games.

On 1 October 2021, Linger died of pancreatic cancer at the age of 46. He was diagnosed with the disease earlier in the year.
