= Marios Kyriakou =

Cypriot footballer (born 1974)

Personal information
- Date of birth: 13 January 1974 (age 52)
- Position: Defender

Senior career*
Years	Team	Apps	(Gls)
1996–1999	Apollon Limassol FC		
1999–2000	AEL Limassol FC		
2000–2004	Ethnikos Achna FC		
2003	→ Digenis Morphou		
2004	→ Apollon Limassol FC		
2004–2006	APEP FC		

International career
1999	Cyprus	1	(0)
- * Club domestic league appearances and goals

Marios Kyriakou (born 13 January 1974) is a retired Cypriot football defender.
