= René Soller =

Swiss footballer (born 1974)

Personal information
- Date of birth: 31 May 1974 (age 52)
- Position: Defender

Senior career*
Years	Team	Apps	(Gls)
1994–1995	FC St. Gallen		
1996–1997	FC Gossau		
1997–1998	FC Wil 1900		
- * Club domestic league appearances and goals

René Soller (born 31 May 1974) is a retired Swiss football defender.
