= Simone Addessi =

Italian footballer

Personal information
- Date of birth: 1 January 1995 (age 31)
- Place of birth: Fondi, Italy
- Height: 1.73 m (5 ft 8 in)
- Position: Winger

Team information
- Current team: Nocerina

Youth career
- –2014: Latina

Senior career*
Years	Team	Apps	(Gls)
2014–2015	Parma	0	(0)
2014–2015	→ Rimini (loan)	9	(0)
2015	→ Fondi (loan)	9	(1)
2015–2016	Viterbese	12	(2)
2016–2018	Fondi	39	(4)
2018–2019	Turris	25	(10)
2019–2020	Cavese	16	(1)
2020–2021	Messina	16	(7)
2021–2022	Casertana	8	(0)
2022–2023	Lamezia	22	(12)
2023–2024	Cavese	24	(9)
2024–	Nocerina	0	(0)
- * Club domestic league appearances and goals as of 5 May 2024

Simone Addessi (born 1 January 1995) is an Italian professional footballer who plays as a winger for Serie D club Nocerina.

== Club career ==
On 21 December 2021, he signed with Serie D club Casertana as a free agent.
