= Giuseppe Figliomeni =

Italian footballer

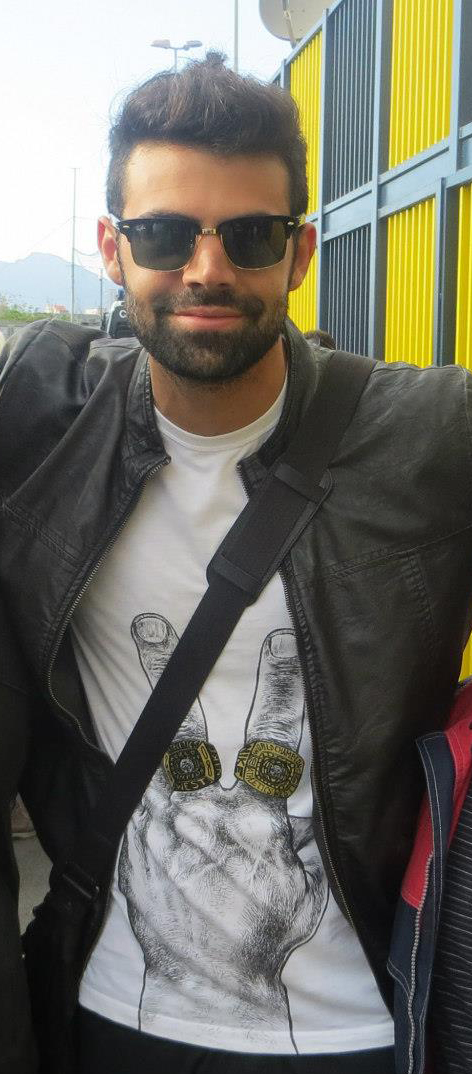

Personal information
- Date of birth: 2 June 1987 (age 39)
- Place of birth: Reggio Calabria, Italy
- Height: 1.92 m (6 ft 4 in)
- Position: Centre back

Youth career
- Crotone

Senior career*
Years	Team	Apps	(Gls)
2006–2009	Crotone	69	(1)
2007	→ Internazionale (loan)	0	(0)
2009–2010	Arezzo	24	(2)
2010–2012	Varese	12	(1)
2012	→ Nocerina (loan)	14	(1)
2012–2013	Juve Stabia	29	(0)
2013–2016	Latina	25	(1)
2014–2015	→ Vicenza (loan)	6	(0)
2016–2017	Trapani	7	(0)
2017–2018	Foggia	7	(0)
2018–2020	Catanzaro	30	(2)
2020	Gozzano	4	(0)
2020–2021	Casarano	19	(3)
2021–2022	Acireale	25	(4)
2022–2023	Matera	7	(2)
Total		278	(17)
- * Club domestic league appearances and goals

Giuseppe Figliomeni (born 2 June 1987) is an Italian former footballer who plays as a centre back.

== Career ==
Born in Reggio Calabria, Calabria, Figliomeni started his professional career at Calabrian team Crotone. He made his Serie B debut on 8 December 2006, replacing Dante López in the last minute. On 5 January 2007 he was loaned to Internazionale's Primavera under-20 team, winning the league champion. He also received call-up from Roberto Mancini to the first team, but did not play.

Inter did not bought him and Figliomeni returned to Crotone. He only played 19 league games before left for Lega Pro Prima Divisione club Arezzo. He left the club after Arezzo was expelled from the professional league by the Commissione di Vigilanza sulle Società di Calcio Professionistiche (Co.Vi.So.C.) of FIGC as the committee rejected to issue new license to Arezzo at the end of season.

In July 2010 he was signed by Serie B club Varese. Figliomeni was loaned out for the second half of the 2011–12 season to Nocerina. He was sold in co-ownership to fellow Serie B club Juve Stabia in July 2012. In June 2013 Varese gave up the remain 50% registration rights to Juve Stabia.

In August 2013 Figliomeni was jointly signed by Parma and Latina. On 20 June 2014 Latina signed Figliomeni outright, with Simone Addessi moved to opposite direction.

On 15 September 2014 Figliomeni left for fellow Serie B club Vicenza in another loan. On 28 January 2015 Figliomeni returned to Latina.

On 31 August 2016 Figliomeni was signed by Trapani.

On 20 July 2018, he signed a two-year contract with Serie C club Catanzaro.

On 15 January 2020, he moved to Gozzano.
