= Charis Nicolaou =

Cypriot footballer (born 1974)

Personal information
- Full name: Charis Nicolaou
- Date of birth: March 31, 1974 (age 52)
- Place of birth: Nicosia, Cyprus
- Height: 1.76 m (5 ft 9 in)
- Position: Midfielder

Team information
- Current team: AEK Larnaca
- Number: 8

Youth career
- Alki Larnaca

Senior career*
| Years | Team | Apps | (Gls) |
| 1995–2006 | AC Omonia | 299 | (7) |
| 2006–2009 | AEK Larnaca | 54 | (1) |
| 2009– | ASIL Lysi | 2 | (0) |

International career
| 1996– | Cyprus | 11 | (0) |
- * Club domestic league appearances and goals

Charis Nicolaou (born March 31, 1974, in Nicosia, Cyprus) is a Cypriot football midfielder. He is a right-footed midfielder.

== Career ==
Nicolaou made his debut for AC Omonia in 1995 at the age of nineteen. He had a successful career in Omonia with 299 appearances. In his last season in Omonia, 2005–06, he only made 9 appearances and then he moved to AEK Larnaca. He was one of the best young players introduced in a difficult season in Omonia.
