= Adriano da Cruz =

Brazilian footballer (born 1974)

Personal information
- Full name: Adriano Alves da Cruz
- Date of birth: 27 August 1974 (age 52)
- Place of birth: Piracibaba
- Position: Defender

Senior career*
Years	Team	Apps	(Gls)
1992–1993	Standard Liège		
1993–1997	K.V. Kortrijk		
1997–2000	R.E. Mouscron		
2000–2001	F.C. Marco		
2002–2003	S.W.I. Harelbeke		
2004	K.S.K. Wevelgem City		
- * Club domestic league appearances and goals

Adriano Alves da Cruz (born 27 August 1974) is a retired Brazilian football defender.
