= Stefan Andrić =

Macedonian footballer (born 1996)

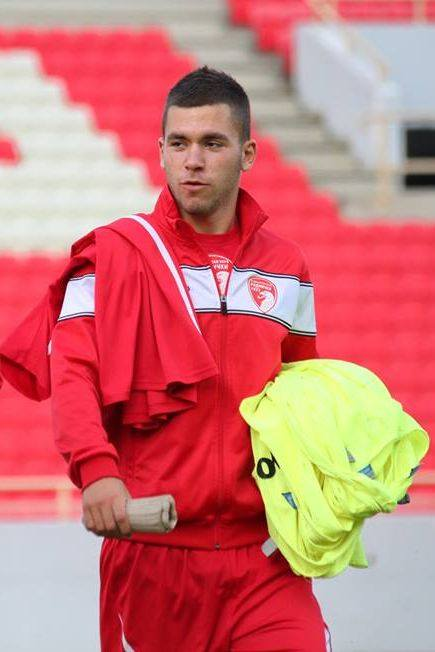
- Andrić with Radnički Kragujevac

Personal information
- Full name: Stefan Andrić
- Date of birth: 2 April 1996 (age 30)
- Place of birth: Gornji Milanovac, FR Yugoslavia
- Height: 1.77 m (5 ft 9 1/2 in)
- Position: Midfielder

Youth career
- 2003–2011: Metalac Gornji Milanovac
- 2011–2014: Radnički Kragujevac

Senior career*
Years	Team	Apps	(Gls)
2014–2016	Radnički Kragujevac	13	(0)
2016	Metalac Gornji Milanovac	0	(0)
2016	Šumadija 1903	5	(0)
2017	Panserraikos	2	(0)
2017	Renens		
2018-2019	Azzurri 90		
2019	Sloga 33		
2020	Radnički Novi Beograd		
2020	Takovo		
2021	Tutin		
2021	Radnički Svilajnac		
2022	Pandramaikos		
2023	Radnički Novi Beograd	14	(2)

International career^{‡}
2014	Macedonia U19	2	(0)
- * Club domestic league appearances and goals as of 4 April 2017 ‡ National team caps and goals as of 23 June 2016

Stefan Andrić; (Serbian Cyrillic: Стефан Андрић; Macedonian: Стефан Андриќ; born 2 April 1996) is a professional footballer. Born in Serbia, he represented Macedonia at youth level.

== Club career ==
Born in Gornji Milanovac, Andrić moved in Radnički Kragujevac at the age of 15. After a few seasons spent with youth team, Andrić was promoted in the first team for the 2014–15 Serbian SuperLiga season and signed his first professional contract under coach Dragoljub Bekvalac, but later he missed the whole season because of injury. Andrić recovered an injury and returned in squad for the next season, and he made his debut for Radnički in the 2nd fixture of the 2015–16 Serbian First League season against Sloga Petrovac, under Neško Milovanović. During the first half-season, he collected 11 caps, mostly as a starter, but for the spring half of season, Radovan Radaković used him just two times on the field, in matches against Proleter Novi Sad and Napredak Kruševac.

In summer 2016, Andrić returned to Metalac Gornji Milanovac. After pre-season spent with the club, Andrić moved to Serbian League West side Šumadija 1903 for the 2016–17 Serbian League West season. He made his debut for new club in 4th fixture match, against Železničar Lajkovac, played on 3 September 2016.

At the beginning of 2017, Andrić moved to Greece, signing a year-and-a-half deal with Panserraikos. He spent the second half of the 2022–23 season at Radnički Novi Beograd.

== International career ==
As his mother originating from Skopje, Andrić represented Macedonia at U-19 national team level.

== Career statistics ==
As of 4 April 2017

Club	Season	League			Cup		Continental		Other		Total	
Club	Season	Division	Apps	Goals	Apps	Goals	Apps	Goals	Apps	Goals	Apps	Goals
Radnički 1923	2014–15	Serbian SuperLiga	0	0	0	0	—		—		0	0
Radnički 1923	2015–16	Serbian First League	13	0	0	0	—		—		13	0
Radnički 1923	Total		13	0	0	0	—		—		13	0
Metalac	2016–17	Serbian SuperLiga	—		—		—		—		—	
Šumadija 1903	2016–17	Serbian League West	5	0	—		—		—		5	0
Panserraikos	2016–17	Football League Greece	2	0	—		—		—		2	0
Career total			18	0	0	0	—		—		18	0
