= Ruslan Shumskikh =

Russian footballer

Personal information
- Full name: Ruslan Alekseyevich Shumskikh
- Date of birth: 21 September 1974 (age 52)
- Height: 1.90 m (6 ft 3 in)
- Position: Goalkeeper

Senior career*
Years	Team	Apps	(Gls)
1994	FC Estel Ufa	11	(0)
2004	FC Lada Togliatti	2	(0)
2005–2006	FC Neftekhimik Nizhnekamsk	43	(0)
2006–2009	FC Lada Togliatti	39	(0)
- * Club domestic league appearances and goals

Ruslan Alekseyevich Shumskikh (Russian: Руслан Алексеевич Шумских; born 21 September 1974) is a former Russian professional football player.

== Club career ==
He made his Russian Football National League debut for FC Lada Togliatti on 25 July 2006 in a game against FC Spartak Nizhny Novgorod.
