= Divertimento for Chamber Orchestra after Keyboard Pieces by Couperin =

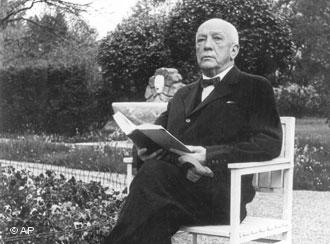
Richard Strauss 1938

The Divertimento for Chamber Orchestra after Keyboard Pieces by Couperin, Op. 86 (German: Divertimento aus Klavierstücken von François Couperin für kleines Orchester) is an orchestral suite composed by Richard Strauss published in 1942 which consists of eight movements, each one based on a selection of pieces from François Couperin's Pièces de Clavecin written for the solo harpsichord over the period 1713 to 1730.

== Composition history ==
The bulk of the divertimento was written to complement the earlier 1923 Dance Suite after Keyboard Pieces by Couperin for a ballet Verklungene Feste: Tanzvisionen aus zwei Jahrhunderten (Bygone Celebrations: Dance Visions from Two Centuries) premiered in Munich on May 20, 1941. The divertimento was then published in 1942 with two additional movements (III and VIII) as an orchestral suite and given an opus number. The premiere was given on 31 January 1943 by the Vienna Philharmonic conducted by Clemens Krauss. Although much of the music for the divertimento was written for the ballet, Strauss wrote it with the end product of the divertimento in mind. In his note books he wrote on September 17, 1940 that he had completed "movements 1-3 of the Divertimento"; December 27 movements 4 and 5; September 12, 1941 the Divertimento was finished. Thus although there is a letter from Clemens Krauss on 13 August 1941 suggesting a "second Couperin suite", the "second suite" had been Strauss' intention for some time.

Norman Del Mar wrote of the Divertimento: "The juxtapositions, additions and reworkings to be found in the Divertimento are a little nearer in flavor to the original Couperin than the 1923 Dance Suite ... Nevertheless, Strauss's procedure is not markedly different. Apart from generally filling in the textures with new and often elaborate counterpoints, the emphasis is still on abridging the original simple binary pieces by the omission of repeats or by lopping off the closing bars in favor of newly devised and extended codas".

== Source of each movement ==
Couperin's collection of piano pieces pièces de clavecin is organized into 25 "sequences" (ordres), each of which consists of several pieces, with a title for each piece. Depending on the publisher, these are also divided into volumes. However, the original publication was in four volumes (volume 1 published in 1713 contains sequences 1–5, volume 2 published in 1717 contains sequences 6–12, volume 3 published in 1722 contains sequences 13–19, volume 4 published in 1730 contains sequences 20–25). In the table, the first column gives the number of the movement in the Strauss Divertimento (Roman numeral). The second column lists the source in Couperin in the order in which they appear in the Strauss. First the name (in French) and three numbers in brackets – the first gives the original volume, the second the Ordre or "sequence" and the third the position of the piece within the sequence: hence (2,12,2) means that the piece is the second in the 12th sequence which was originally published in volume 2.

Strauss Divertimento movement	Source in Couperin (volume, sequence (ordre), number)
I	1. La Visionnaire (4,25,1)
II	1. Musete de choise (3,15,4); 2. Le fine madelon et et la douce janneton (4,20, 5–6); 3. La sezile (4,20,7); 4. Muset de taverni (3,15,5)
III	1. Le tic-toc-choc (3,18,6); 2. La Lutine (1,3,12)
IV	1. Les fauveties plaintives (3,14,3); 2. Les sentimens, sarabande (1,1,11)
V	1. Le trophee (4,22,1); 2. L'anguile (4,22,4); 3. Les jeunes seigneurs. Cy-devant les petites maitres(4,24,2); 4. La Linote Efarouchee(3,14,2)
VI	1. Les tours de passe-passe (4,22,7)
VII	1. Les ombres erante (4,25,5)
VIII	1. Les Brinbarions (4,25,5); 2. La Badine (1,5,6)
Source: Norman Del Mar (volume 2, page 280); Heisler (page 177)

== Instrumentation ==
The Divertimento suite uses a chamber orchestra with the following instrumentation:

- 2 flutes, oboe, cor anglais (oboe), 2 clarinets, 2 bassoons
- 2 horns, trumpet, trombone
- Timpani
- Percussion: bass drum, cymbals, tambourine, triangle
- Harpsichord, organ, harp, celesta
- Strings

This is a slightly larger orchestra than for the 1923 Dance Suite. In particular, the organ is added in II.1 and II.4 in part to provide a drone for the "bagpipe". The additional percussion and timpani are used together in movement V.1, whilst the triangle appears on its own in VIII.1 and the tambourine in VIII.2.

== Recordings of the Divertimento ==
There have been several recordings of this piece, some of which are listed in the table. There was also a recording by Clemens Krauss taken from a live radio broadcast issued on the Amadeo label in 1988 which is no longer available.

CD title	Orchestra and conductor	Reference
Arnold Schoenberg: Concerto For String Quartet And Orchestra (After Handel); Richard Strauss: Divertimento For Small Orchestra (After Couperin), (2002)	New York Chamber Symphony, Gerard Schwarz	Nonesuch Records – B000063735
Munch conducts Romantic Favourites (live performances, 1951–57).	Boston Symphony Orchestra, Charles Munch	West Hill Radio Archive – WHRA6017
Ballet Suites after Couperin (1999)	Bamberg Symphony, Karl Anton Rickenbacher	Koch – 365352
Strauss: Le Bourgeois Gentilhomme, Divertimento After Couperin (2007)	Orpheus Chamber Orchestra (no conductor)	Deutsche Grammophon 435871
Strauss: Verklungene Feste / Tanzsuite / Divertimento. (1993)	Tokyo Metropolitan Symphony Orchestra, Hiroshi Wakasugi	Denon Records B00000DT02

== Bygone Celebrations: Dance Visions from Two Centuries ==
The ballet Verklungene Feste: Tanzvisionen aus zwei Jahrhunderten for which the music from the divertimento was written was the idea of Clemens Krauss, the director of the Munich opera (1937–43). Originally, he had envisaged the 1923 Dance Suite (also known as the Couperin Suite) to be the first half with Strauss's Josephslegende being the second half. The choreographers Pia and Pino Mlakar had already choreographed the Dance Suite for a performance in 1936 and were given the task of creating a new version of Josephslegende. However, they suggested using Feuillet's Chorégraphie (1700) to reconstruct the choreography of the time of Couperin. Krauss wrote to Strauss "Mlakar has found the original choreography by famous dance masters from Couperin's time and wants to make use of it for the Couperin Suite. Now a question: would you be so kind as to expand the Couperin suite with two new dances should the need arise?" In the end, Strauss wrote several new dances and incidental music for the ballet.

In the final version there were six parts to the Bygone Celebrations which takes about 55 minutes to perform. The order of the music was as follows:

Bygone Celebrations	Source in Divertimento or Dance Suite
Part 1. Prelude	1. Divertimento I 2. Divertimento II.2; 3. Divertimento II.3; 4. Divertimento II.4; 5. Dance suite 1
Part 2. "Das Fest"	1. Dance suite 2; 2. Dance suite 3; 3. Dance suite 4; 4. Dance suite 5
Part 3 Interlude	1. Divertimento VII; 2. Divertimento V.1
Part 4. Flora and Zephyr	1. Divertimento V.4; 2. Divertimento IV; 3. Divertimento II.5; 4. Divertimento VI; 5. Divertimento II.1; 6. Dance suite 6
Part 5. Interlude	1. Dance suite 7
Part 6. Finale	1. Dance suite 8
Source: Heisler, Table 5.1 (p. 177)

It can be seen that whilst the material form the 1923 Dance Suite was included as whole movements, the music used in the Divertimento was not played in the same order as it appeared in the ballet. For example, the second movement of the Divertimento appears as parts 2–4 in the Prelude, with parts 1 and 5 in "Flora and Zephyr" separate and in reverse order. Movements III and VIII of the Divertimento were not part of Bygone Celebrations, neither were parts of movement V (V.2 and V.3).

The ballet was performed at the Munich opera 5 times on the 1940/41 season. Its premiere in France was in Paris 1947. When Pino Mlakar became the Ballet Director at the Munich opera, the ballet was performed around Bavaria in 1953 and 1954. The Yugoslav premiere was held in Dubrovnik in 1956. Portions of Bygone Celebrations were performed in Slovenia in December 2006 to mark Pino Mlakar's death, and March 2007 for the centenary of his birth

There are no recordings of the ballet as performed. There is a recording titled Verklungene Feste by the Tokyo Metropolitan Symphony Orchestra (see table above, recordings of Divertimento), but this is just the two pieces Dance Suite and Divertimento, not the original ballet score.

== Sources ==
- Wayne Heisler Jr. The Ballet Collaborations of Richard Strauss, University of Rochester Press, 2009. ISBN 978-1-58046-321-8
- Norman Del Mar, Richard Strauss: A Critical Commentary on His Life and Works (second edition), Volume 2. Faber and Faber, London (1986). ISBN 978-0-571-25097-4.
- Trenner, Franz (2003) Richard Strauss Chronik, Verlag Dr Richard Strauss Gmbh, Wien, ISBN 3-901974-01-6.
