= Pavel Korovkin =

Pavel Petrovich Korovkin
- Павел Петрович Коровкин
- Born: 9 July 1913; Vesyegonsk, Tver Governorate
- Died: 11 August 1985 (aged 72); Kaluga, Kaluga Oblast
- Resting place: Kaluga, Kaluga Oblast
- Education: Leningrad State University
- Scientific career
- Fields: Approximation theory Potential theory
- Workplaces: Kalinin State Pedagogical Institute; Moscow Automobile and Road Institute; Kalinin State Pedagogical Institute; Kaluga State Pedagogical Institute

Pavel Petrovich Korovkin (Russian: Павел Петрович Коровкин) (the family name is also transliterated as Korowkin in German sources) (9 July 1913 – 11 August 1985) was a Soviet mathematician whose main fields of research were orthogonal polynomials, approximation theory and potential theory. In 1947 he proved a generalization of Egorov's theorem: from the early 1950s on, his research interests turned to functional analysis and he examined the stability of the exterior Dirichlet problem and the convergence and approximation properties of linear positive operators on spaces of continuous functions. The set of terms and Korovkin approximation are named after him.

== Life and career ==
Korovkin was born to a poor peasant family. He lost his father early and grew from 1914 to 1920 at an orphanage. In 1930 he graduated high school in Leningrad. As the winner of a mathematics contest he had a right to enter the Leningrad State University without entrance exams. After a year of working at a factory he entered the Faculty of Mathematics and Mechanics. His scientific advisor was V.I. Smirnov. Korovkin earned his doctorate in 1939 with a dissertation on orthogonal polynomials. He then was appointed to Kalinin Pedagogical Institute.

At the beginning of Great Patriotic War Korovkin voluntarily enlisted to the Red Army. He started as a cannon platoon chief and till the end of war promoted to artillery regiment chief. He was awarded with Order of the Red Star.

In December 1945, he continued his work at the Kalinin Pedagogical Institute, in 1947 with a thesis on convergence of polynomial sequences, and was appointed professor in 1948. At the Moscow Automobile and Road Institute from 1958 to 1970 he headed the department of higher mathematics, then he became head of the Department of Mathematical Analysis at the Kaluga State Pedagogical Institute.

== Selected publications ==
- Korovkin, P. P. (1947), "Generalization of a theorem of D. F. Egorov", Doklady Akademii Nauk SSSR (in Russian), 58: 1265–1267, MR 0023322, Zbl 0038.03803.
- Korovkin, P. P. (1959), Линейные операторы и теория приближений (in Russian), Москва: Физматгиз, p. 211, Zbl 0094.10201, translated in English as Linear operators and approximation theory, Russian monographs and texts on advanced mathematics and physics, vol. III, Hindustan Publishing Corporation (India), 1960, MR 0150565.
