= List of compositions by François Couperin =

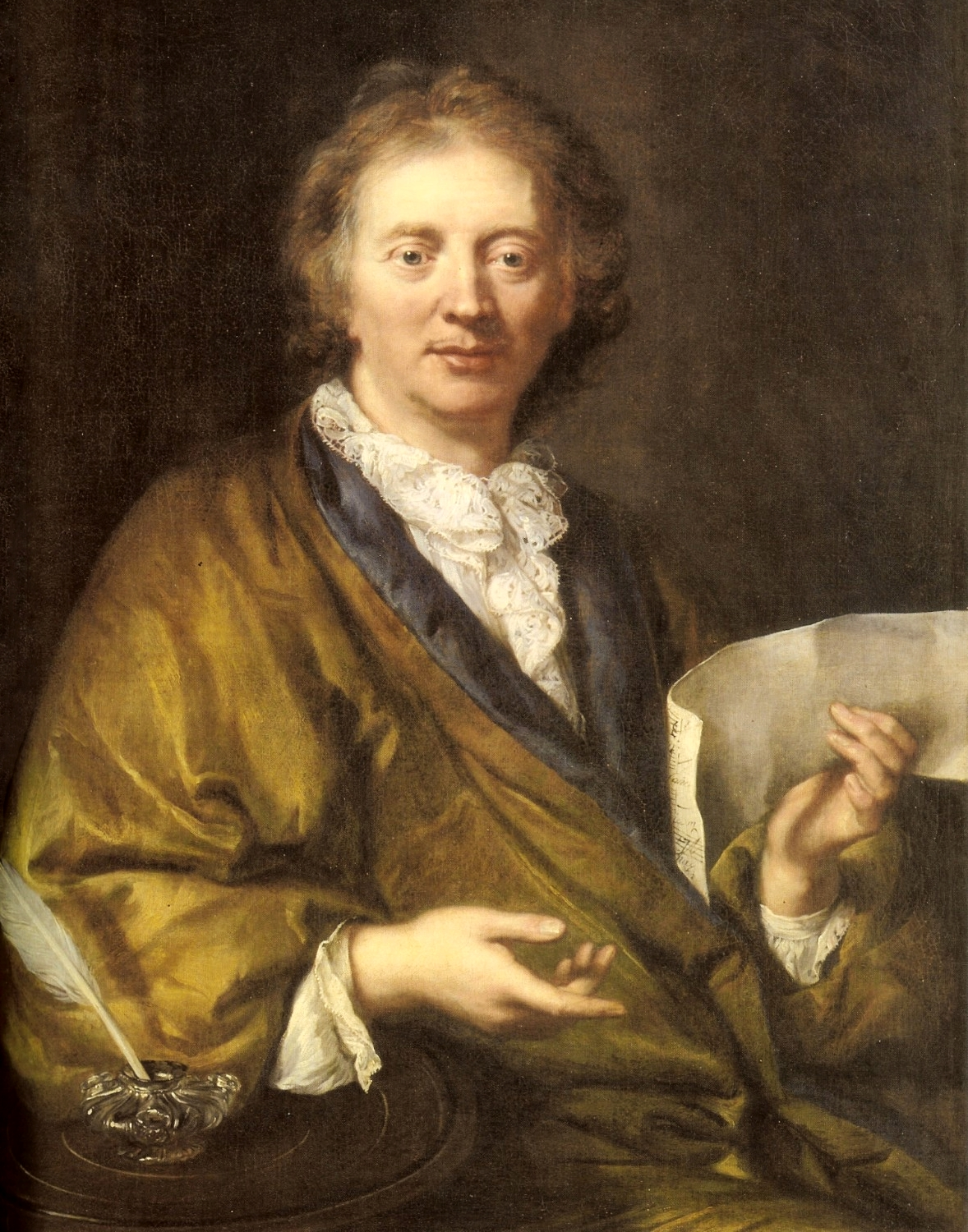
Couperin (anon.), collection of the Château de Versailles.

The following is a complete list of compositions by François Couperin.

== Instrumental compositions ==
=== For harpsichord ===
L’Art de Toucher le Clavecin (1716), a didactic treatise that includes eight Préludes and an Allemande amounting to about 14 minutes of music.

Premier Livre (First Book, 1713) — Ordres 1 to 5 — about 180 minutes of music

- Ordre 1er de clavecin in G minor: Allemande L'Auguste; Première courante; Seconde courante; Sarabande La majestueuse; Gavotte; La Milordine, gigue; Menuet (et double); Les silvains; Les abeilles; La Nanète; Les sentimens, sarabande; La pastorelle; Les nonètes (Les blondes, Les brunes); La bourbonnoise, gavotte; La Manon; L'enchanteresse; La fleurie, ou La tendre Nanette; Les plaisirs de St Germain en Laÿe
- Ordre 2ème de clavecin in D minor: Allemande La laborieuse; Premiere courante; Seconde courante; Sarabande La prude; L'Antonine; Gavote; Menuet; Canaries (avec double); Passe-pied; Rigaudon; La Charoloise; La Diane; Fanfare pour la suite de la Diane; La Terpsicore; La Florentine; La Garnier; La Babet; Les idées heureuses; La Mimi; La diligente; La flateuse; La voluptueuse; Les papillons
- Ordre 3ème de clavecin in C minor: La ténébreuse, allemande; Premiere courante; Seconde courante; La lugubre, sarabande; Gavotte; Menuet; Les pélerines; Les laurentines; L'Espagnolète; Les regrets; Les matelotes provençales; La favorite, chaconne; La lutine
- Ordre 4ème de clavecin in F major: La marche des gris-vêtus; Les baccanales; La pateline; Le réveil-matin
- Ordre 5ème de clavecin in A major: La logiviére, allemande; Premier courante; Seconde courante; La dangereuse, sarabande; Gigue; La tendre Fanchon; La badine; La bandoline; La Flore; L'Angélique; La Villers; Les vendangeuses; Les agrémens; Les ondes

Second Livre (Second Book, 1717) — Ordres 6 to 12 — about 165 minutes of music

- Ordre 6ème de clavecin in B♭ major: Les moissoneurs; Les langueurs-tendres; Le gazoüillement; La Bersan; Les baricades mistérieuses; Les bergeries, rondeau; La commére; Le moucheron
- Ordre 7ème de clavecin in G major: La Ménetou; Les petits âges: La muse naissante, L'enfantine, L'adolescente, Les délices; La Basque; La Chazé; Les amusemens
- Ordre 8ème de clavecin in B minor: La Raphaéle; Allemande L'Ausoniéne; Premiere courante; Seconde courante; Sarabande L'unique; Gavotte; Rondeau; Gigue; Passacaille; La Morinéte
- Ordre 9ème de clavecin in A major: Allemande à deux clavecins; La rafraîchissante; Les charmes; La Princesse de Sens; L'olimpique; L'insinüante; La séduisante; Le bavolet-flotant; Le petit-deüil, ou Les trois veuves; Menuet
- Ordre 10ème de clavecin in D major: La triomphante; La Mézangére; La Gabriéle; La Nointéle; La fringante; L'amazône; Les bagatelles
- Ordre 11ème de clavecin in C major: La castelane; L'etincelante, ou La bontems; Les graces-naturéles; La Zénobie; Les fastes de la grande et ancienne Ménestrandise
- Ordre 12ème de clavecin in E major: Les juméles; L'intîme, mouvement de courante; La galante; La coribante; La Vauvré; La fileuse; La boulonoise; L'Atalante

Troisième Livre (Third Book, 1722) — Ordres 13 to 19 — about 135 minutes of music

- Ordre 13ème de clavecin in B minor: Les lis naissans; Les rozeaux; L'engageante; Les folies françoises, ou Les dominos; L'âme-en peine
- Ordre 14ème de clavecin in D major: Le rossignol-en-amour; Double du rossignol; La linote-éfarouchée; Les fauvétes plaintives; Le rossignol-vainqueur; La Julliet; Le carillon de Cithére; Le petit-rien
- Ordre 15ème de clavecin in A major: La régente, ou La Minerve; Le dodo, ou L'amour au berceau; L'evaporée; Muséte de Choisi; Muséte de Taverni; La douce et piquante; Les vergers fleüris; La Princesse de Chabeüil, ou La muse de Monaco
- Ordre 16ème de clavecin in G major: Les graces incomparables, ou La Conti; L'himen-amour; Les vestales; L'aimable Thérèse; Le drôle de corps; La distraite; La Létiville
- Ordre 17ème de clavecin in E minor: La superbe, ou La Forqueray; Les petits moulins à vent; Les timbres; Courante; Les petites chrémières de Bagnolet
- Ordre 18ème de clavecin in F major: Allemande La Verneüil; La Verneüilléte; Sœur Monique; Le turbulent; L'atendrissante; Le tic-toc-choc, ou Les maillotins; Le gaillard-boiteux
- Ordre 19ème de clavecin in D major: Les Calotins et les Calotines, ou La piéce à tretous; Les Calotines; L'ingénuë; L'artiste; Les culbutes Ixcxbxnxs; La muse-Palantine; L'enjouée

Quatrième Livre (Fourth Book, 1730) — Ordres 20 to 27 — about 145 minutes of music

- Ordre 20ème de clavecin in G major: La Princesse Marie; La boufonne; Les chérubins, ou L'aimable Lazure; La Croûilli, ou La Couperinéte; La fine Madelon; La douce Janneton; La Sezile; Les tambourins
- Ordre 21ème de clavecin in E minor: La reine des cœurs; La bondissante; La Couperin; La harpée; La petite Pince-sans-rire
- Ordre 22ème de clavecin in D major: Le trophée; Le point du jour, allemande; L'.anguille; Le croc-en-jambe; Menuets croisés; Les tours de passe-passe
- Ordre 23ème de clavecin in F major: L’Audacieuse [The Audacious]; Les tricoteuses [The Knitters]; L’Arlequine [The Harlequin]; Les Gondoles de Délos [The Gondolas of Delos]; Les Satires, Chevre-Pieds [The Satyrs, Goat-footed]
- Ordre 24ème de clavecin in A major: Les vieux seigneurs, sarabande grave; Les jeunes seigneurs; Les dars-homicides; Les guilandes; Les brinborions; La divine-Babiche, ou Les amours badins; La belle Javotte, autre fois l'infante; L'amphibie, mouvement de passacaille
- Ordre 25ème de clavecin in E♭ major / C minor: La visionnaire; La misterieuse; La Monflambert; La muse victorieuse; Les ombres errantes
- Ordre 26ème de clavecin in F♯ minor: La convalescente; Gavote; La Sophie; L’epineuse; La pantomime
- Ordre 27ème de clavecin in B minor: L'exquise, allemande; Les pavots; Les chinois; Saillie

=== For organ ===
Two Mass settings (1690)

- Messe pour les paroisses (for the parishes)
- Messe pour les couvents (for the convents)

=== Chamber music ===
Sonades [sic] en trio, or Trio Sonatas (ca. 1690):

- L’astrée
- La convalescente (written later, ca. 1720)
- La pucelle
- La Steinkerque in B♭ major
- La superbe in A major
- La visionnaire

Sonade [sic] en quatuor, or Quartet Sonata (ca. 1695):

- La sultanne in D minor

Les concerts royaux (1714)

- Concert No. 1 in G major
- Concert No. 2 in D major
- Concert No. 3 in A major
- Concert No. 4 in E minor

Nouveaux concerts, ou Les goûts réunis (1724)

- Concert No. 5 in F major
- Concert No. 6 in B♭ major
- Concert No. 7 in G minor
- Concert No. 8 in G major “Dans le goût théâtral”
- Concert No. 9 in E major “Il ritratto dell’amore”
- Concert No. 10 in A minor
- Concert No. 11 in C minor
- Concert No. 12 in A major
- Concert No. 13 in G major
- Concert No. 14 in D minor

Sonades [sic] et suites de simphonies [sic] en trio “Les Nations” (1726)
This set of trio pieces (two unspecified treble parts plus basso continuo) consists of four trio sonatas (all written earlier and listed above) each followed by a 20-minute dance suite:

- La françoise [sic] (opens with La pucelle) in E minor
- L’espagnole (opens with La visionnaire) in C minor
- L’impériale (opens with La convalescente) in D minor
- La piémontoise (opens with L’astrée) in G minor

Apothéoses, trio sonatas (1724-5):

- Le Parnasse ou l'apothéose de Corelli in B minor
- L'Apothéose de Lully in G minor

Pièces de violes (1728): 2 suites

- Suite pour violes de gambe No. 1 in E minor
- Suite pour violes de gambe No. 2 in A major

== Sacred vocal ==
Leçons de ténèbres (1714)
These are all for Wednesday. Couperin did not write for the Thursday or Friday light-dimming offices.

- Première leçon de ténèbres
- Seconde leçon de ténèbres
- Troisième leçon de ténèbres

Antiphons, psalm settings & canticles:

- Salve Regina
- Regina coeli laetare
- Tantum ergo sacramentum
- Laudate pueri Dominum in A minor
- Magnificat in A minor

Offertories:

- Elévation: Lauda Sion salvatorem
- Elévation: O amor O gaudium in D major
- Elévation: O Domine quia refugium in G minor
- Elévation: O Jesu amantissime in G minor
- Elévation: O misterium ineffabile in D major
- Elévation: Quid retribuam tibi Domine in E minor
- Elévation: Respice in me
- Elévation: Usquequo Domine
- Elévation: Venite exultemus Domine in E minor

Motets:

- 4 versets d'un motet composé de l'ordre du Roy
- 7 versets d'un motet composé de l'ordre du Roy (1704)
- 7 versets d'un motet composé de l'ordre du Roy (1705)
- Audite omnes et expavescite in G minor
- Dialogus inter Deum et hominem in D minor
- Domine salvum fac regem
- Motet de Saint Augustin in D major
- Motet de Saint Barthélémy in C major
- Motet de Sainte Anne in G minor
- Motet de Sainte Suzanne in D major
- Motet pour le jour de Pâques in D major
- Verset du motet de l'année dernière

== Secular vocal ==
Canons:

- A moy! Tout est perdu!
- La femme entre deux draps

Songs:

- Brunette
- Epitaphe d'un paresseux
- La pastorelle
- Les pèlerines
- Les solitaires
- Musette
- Sentimental air for soprano & continuo in D major
- Sentimental air for tenor & continuo in E minor
- Trois vestales champetres et trois poliçons
- Vaudeville
