= Mirko Andrić =

Serbian footballer

Personal information
- Full name: Mirko Andrić
- Date of birth: 1 June 1974 (age 52)
- Place of birth: Loznica, SFR Yugoslavia
- Height: 1.82 m (5 ft 11 1/2 in)
- Position: Defender

Senior career*
Years	Team	Apps	(Gls)
199x–1997	Loznica	57	(1)
1998–1999	Radnički Niš	24	(1)
1999–2001	Mladost Lučani	85	(0)
2002–2003	Srem	30	(2)
2003–2006	Budućnost Banatski Dvor		
2006–2007	Smederevo	13	(1)
2008	Modriča		
- * Club domestic league appearances and goals as of 25 October 2014

Mirko Andrić (Serbian Cyrillic: Мирко Андрић; born 1 June 1974) is a Serbian former professional footballer who played as a defender.
