= David Dei =

Italian association footballer (born 1974)

Personal information
- Date of birth: 20 January 1974 (age 52)
- Place of birth: Arezzo, Italy
- Height: 1.81 m (5 ft 11 in)
- Position: Goalkeeper

Senior career*
Years	Team	Apps	(Gls)
1992–1993	Arezzo	0	(0)
1993–1994	Fiorentina	0	(0)
1994–1996	Benevento	61	(0)
1996–1998	Ancona	8	(0)
1998–2001	Pistoiese	54	(0)
1999	→ Empoli (loan)	1	(0)
2001–2006	Crotone	87	(0)
2006–2010	Triestina	29	(0)
Total		240	(0)
- * Club domestic league appearances and goals

David Dei (born 20 January 1974) is an Italian former association footballer who played as a goalkeeper.

== Career ==
Dei made his Serie A debut on 23 May 1999 against Udinese Calcio.

Dei became Triestina first choice in 2007–08 season, took the place from Generoso Rossi and eventually Rossi left the club in January. But in 2008–09 season, Michael Agazzi became first choice, Dei became backup again.

After retirement Dei became a goalkeeper coach, which he served for Massimo Rastelli in Avellino. They were hired by Cagliari on 12 June 2015.
