= Dragan Andrić (politician) =

Serbian politician

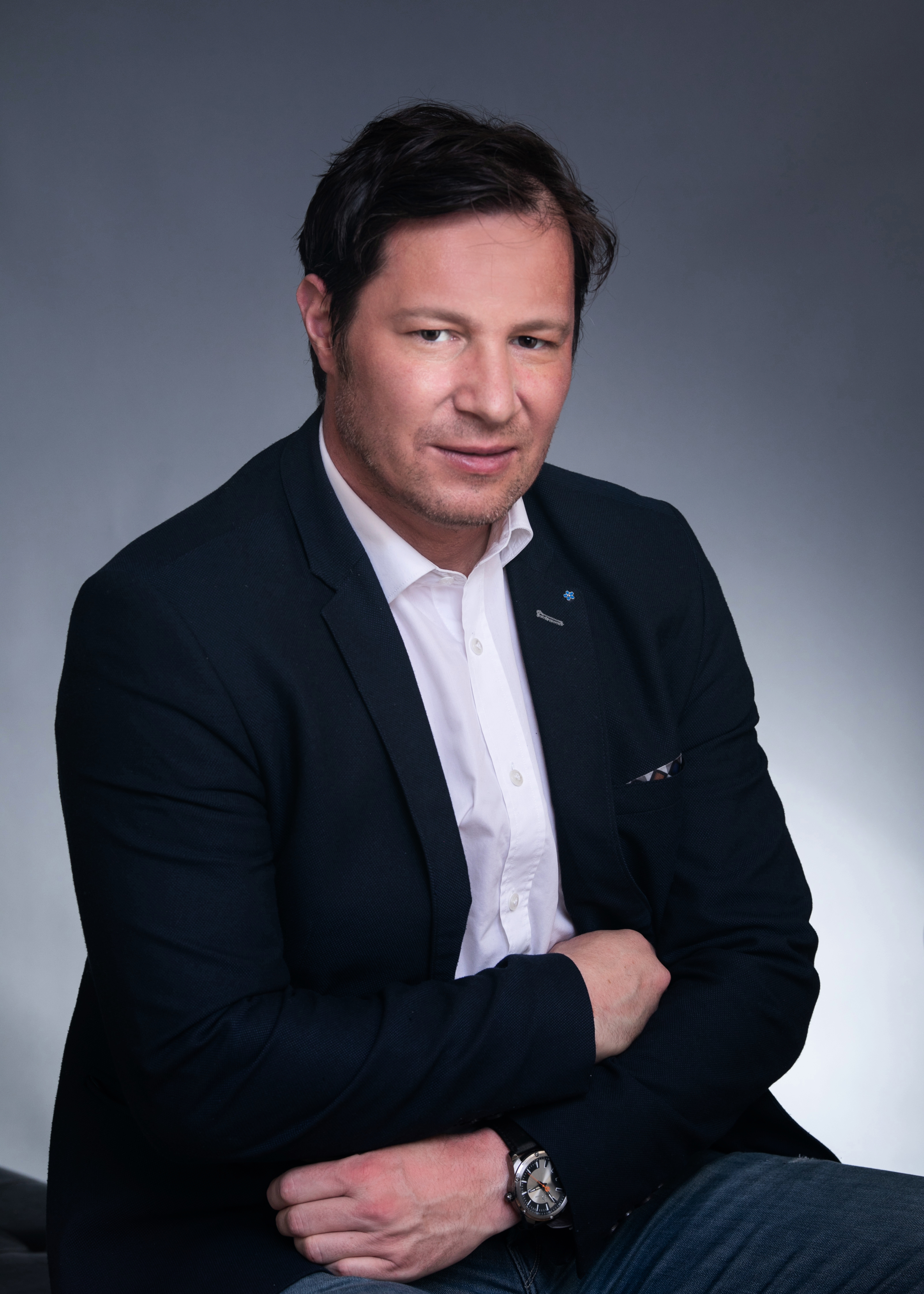
Dragan Andrić

Dragan Andrić (Serbian Cyrillic: Драган Андрић; born 26 March 1975) is a politician in Serbia. He served in the National Assembly of Serbia from 2013 to 2014 as a member of the League of Social Democrats of Vojvodina (LSV).

== Early life and career ==
Andrić was born in Subotica, Vojvodina, in what was then the Socialist Republic of Serbia in the Socialist Federal Republic of Yugoslavia. He was raised in the community, graduated from the law faculty at the University of Novi Sad, and returned to Subotica to work in the public prosecutor's office and with the Serbian ministry of internal affairs.

Dragan Andrić, as a lawyer, enrolled The Vojvodina Bar Association in 2009. Since then his specialistic field is criminal law.

== Political career ==
Andrić received the eighty-sixth position on the electoral list of Choice for a Better Life, a coalition that included the LSV, in the 2012 Serbian parliamentary election. The list won sixty-seven members, and he was not initially elected. He was, however, awarded a mandate on 22 January 2013 as the replacement for Aleksandra Jerkov. During this time, Serbia was governed by a coalition ministry led by the Socialist Party of Serbia and the Serbian Progressive Party, and Andrić served with the LSV in opposition.

The LSV contested the 2014 Serbian parliamentary election as part of an alliance led by former Serbian president Boris Tadić. Andrić received the eighty-eighth position on the alliance's list and was not re-elected when it won eighteen mandates.

For the 2016 parliamentary election, the LSV joined a coalition list with Tadić's Social Democratic Party and the Liberal Democratic Party. Andrić received the 137th position on the list; this was too low a position for direct election to be a realistic possibility, and indeed he was not elected when the list won thirteen mandates.

Andrić has also sought election to the Assembly of Vojvodina on two occasions. In the 2012 provincial election, he was defeated in Subotica's third constituency seat. In the 2016 election he received the twenty-second position on the LSV's list and was not returned when the list won nine mandates.

Andrić was elected to the LSV's main board in 2012 and to the party's presidency in October 2018.

== Electoral record ==
=== Provincial (Vojvodina) ===
2012 Vojvodina assembly election Subotica III (constituency seat) - First and Second Rounds
Robert Santo (incumbent)	Choice for a Better Vojvodina	4,078	23.24	8,280	57.29
Đula Ladocki	Alliance of Vojvodina Hungarians	3,751	21.38	6,173	42.71
Milanka Kostić	Let's Get Vojvodina Moving	1,946	11.09		
Stevan Bakić	Democratic Party of Serbia	1,777	10.13		
Dragan Andrić	League of Social Democrats of Vojvodina	1,669	9.51		
Dejan Antić	Socialist Party of Serbia–Party of United Pensioners of Serbia–United Serbia–Social Democratic Party of Serbia	1,322	7.53		
Atila Abraham	Citizens' Group – Beautiful Vojvodina	793	4.52		
Ivan Šoštarić	United Regions of Serbia	642	3.66		
Péter Kőműves	Democratic Party of Vojvodina Hungarians	594	3.39		
Bojan Race	U-Turn	553	3.15		
Gyula László	Hungarian Hope Movement	423	2.41		
Total valid votes		17,548	100	14,453	100
