= Simone Puleo =

Italian association footballer

Personal information
- Full name: Simone Paolo Puleo
- Date of birth: 2 November 1979 (age 47)
- Place of birth: Milan, Italy
- Height: 1.85 m (6 ft 1 in)
- Position: Defender

Youth career
- Milan

Senior career*
Years	Team	Apps	(Gls)
1996–1998	Milan	0	(0)
1996–1998	→ Solbiatese Arno (loan)	17	(0)
1998–2000	Foggia	40	(1)
2000–2007	Avellino	178	(3)
2006	→ Crotone (loan)	15	(0)
2008–2009	Monza	42	(0)
2009–2012	Avellino	46	(0)
2013	Acireale		
- * Club domestic league appearances and goals

Simone Paolo Puleo (born 2 November 1979) is an Italian former footballer who played as a defender.

== Career ==
Born in Milan, Lombardy, Puleo started his career at A.C. Milan. he then left for Serie C2 club Solbiatese Arno, and then left for Serie C1 club Foggia in co-ownership deal. In 2000 Milan bought back Puleo. Milan re-sold Puleo to Avellino in August 2000. He followed the team promoted to Serie B in 2003 as Serie C1 champion. After Avellino relegated in 2004, he followed the team promoted to Serie B again 2005 as playoff winner. He was loaned to fellow Serie B team Crotone in January 2006. Avellino relegated again in 2006 and promoted again in 2007 as playoff winner. In January 2008, after 6 months without any league appearance for Avellino, he left for Monza.

In September 2009, he terminated the contract with Monza and returned to Avellino for its Serie D campaign. In 2010–11 season, Avellino admitted to Seconda Divisione as numbers of club quit professional football.

== Honours ==
Avellino

- Serie C1: 2003
