= Alfonso Sánchez (Andorran footballer) =

Andorran footballer

Alfonso Sanchez
Personal information
- Date of birth: 27 July 1974 (age 52)
- Place of birth: Andorra
- Position: Goalkeeper

International career
Years	Team	Apps	(Gls)
1996–2004	Andorra	6	(0)

Alfonso Sanchez (born 27 July 1974) is an Andorran football player. He has played for Andorra national team.

== National team statistics ==
Andorra national team
Year	Apps	Goals
1996	1	0
1997	0	0
1998	0	0
1999	1	0
2000	0	0
2001	3	0
2002	0	0
2003	0	0
2004	1	0
Total	6	0
