= Michael Puleo =

American dancer

Michael Puleo is an American dancer, currently ballet master at the Compagnia Virgilio Sieni Danza, Florence, and assistant choreographer at Compagnia del Teatro Nuovo, Turin, Italy. He received his dance training at the Richard Andros Theater Art Center, the New York Performing Arts High School, and the School of American Ballet, and danced with the New York City Ballet, where he performed in the premieres of George Balanchine's Le Bourgeois Gentilhomme and Jerome Robbins' Eight Lines, as well as with the Armitage Ballet Love's End in Armitage 'Contempt' and at the Metropolitan Opera.
