= Nikolai Korovkin =

Russian footballer and coach

Personal information
- Full name: Nikolai Lvovich Korovkin
- Date of birth: 29 December 1974 (age 51)
- Height: 1.79 m (5 ft 10 1/2 in)
- Position: Midfielder

Senior career*
Years	Team	Apps	(Gls)
1992	FC Torpedo Moscow	0	(0)
1992	→ FC Torpedo-d Moscow	9	(1)
1993	FC SUO Moscow	25	(4)
1994	FC TRASKO Moscow	6	(0)
1995	FC Monolit Moscow	42	(16)
1996	FC Chernomorets Novorossiysk	2	(0)
1996	→ FC Chernomorets-d Novorossiysk	6	(1)
1997	FC MEPhI Moscow	14	(1)
1997	FC Torpedo-ZIL Moscow	5	(1)
1998	FC Krasnoznamensk-Selyatino; Krasnoznamensk	20	(4)
1998	FC Spartak Shchyolkovo	28	(4)
2000–2003	FC Krylya Sovetov Moscow (amateur)		
2005–2006	FC Orlyonok Moscow		
2007	FC MUVD na VVT Moscow (amateur)		
2008	FC Korston Moscow		

Managerial career
- 2014–2015: FC Chertanovo Moscow (administrator)
- 2015–2016: FC Chertanovo Moscow (assistant)
- * Club domestic league appearances and goals

Nikolai Lvovich Korovkin (Russian: Николай Львович Коровкин; born 29 December 1974) is a Russian football coach and a former player.
