= Alfonso Sánchez-Tabernero =

Alfonso Sánchez-Tabernero Sánchez
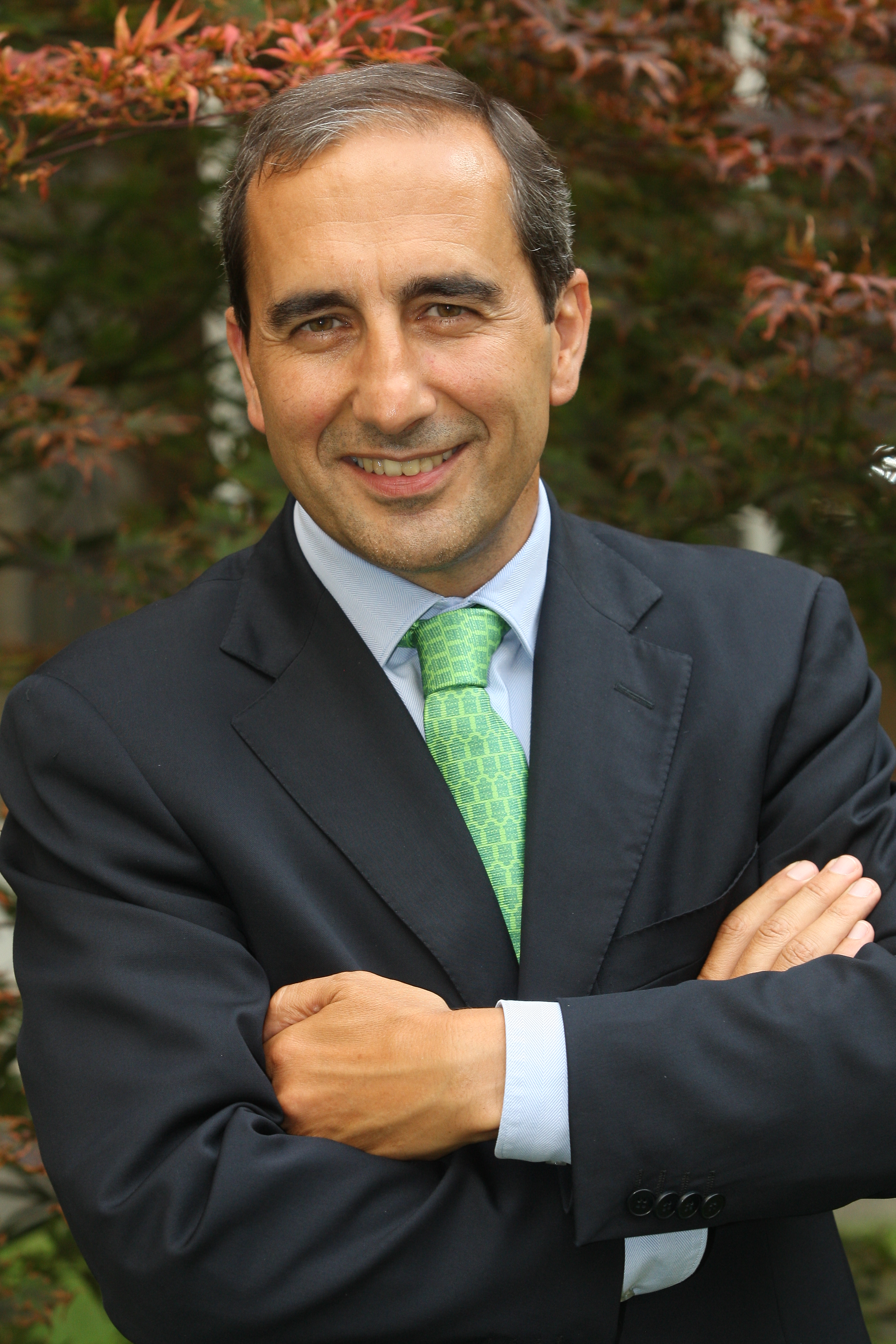
- Born: 17 September 1961 (age 63); Salamanca, Castile and León, Spain
- Citizenship: Spanish
- Education: University of Navarra
- Alma mater: University of Navarra
- Occupation(s): President of the University of Navarra, Full Professor of Media Management

Alfonso Sánchez-Tabernero (born 17 September 1961) is a full professor of media management and the president of the University of Navarra.

== Early life and education ==
Alfonso Sánchez-Tabernero was born on 17 September 1961 in Salamanca to a family steeped in the livestock industry. His paternal grandfather was a doctor and his father a lawyer. On his mother’s side, both his great-grandfather and his great-great-grandfather served as president of the University of Salamanca. He has three siblings. He studied in a school run by the Marist Order. At 18 he moved to Pamplona to take a degree in journalism at the University of Navarra.

== Teaching career ==
In 1991, he was appointed professor and associate dean of the School of Communication at the University of the Basque Country. Having returned to Pamplona, he was dean of the School of Communication at the University of Navarra from 1996 to 2005. In 2007, he was awarded the status of full professor. He served as president of the European Media Management Education Association from 1998 to 2004.

== Selected works ==
- "El Correo Español-El Pueblo Vasco y su entorno informativo: (1910-1985)", Pamplona: Servicio de Publicaciones de la Universidad de Navarra, 1989, 558 pp. ISBN 8487146082
- "Las empresas informativas en la Europa sin fronteras", Bilbao: Universidad del País Vasco, Servicio Editorial, 1992, 150 pp. ISBN 8475853870. Con Carmelo Garitaonandia
- "Concentración de la comunicación en Europa: empresa comercial e interés público", Barcelona: Generalitat de Catalunya, Centre d'Investigació de la Comunicació, 1993, 292 pp. ISBN 8439327218. Traducido al francés: "La concentration des médias en Europe: l'entreprise commerciale et l'intérêt général", Manchester: Institut Europeen de la Communication, 1993, IV, 351 pp. ISBN 3929673088, y al inglés: "Media Concentration in Europe: Commercial Entreprise and the Public Interest", Manchester: European Institute for the Media, 1993, [4] h., VII, 270 pp. ISBN 9783929673029
- "Servicios comerciales de información", Barcelona: Ariel, 1996, 190 pp. ISBN 8434412675. Con Alfonso Nieto Tamargo
- "Estrategias de marketing de las empresas de televisión en España", Pamplona: EUNSA, 1997, 293 pp. ISBN 8431315547
- "Dirección estratégica de empresas de comunicación", Madrid: Cátedra, 2000, 375 pp. ISBN 8437618398
- "Media concentration in the European market: New Trends and Challenges", Palgrave Macmillan, 2003, 196 pages, ISBN 0-333-99295-4
- "Los contenidos de los medios de comunicación: calidad, rentabilidad y competencia", Barcelona: Editorial Deusto-Grupo Planeta, 2008, 288 pp. ISBN 9788423426133
- "The content of media: quality, profit and competition", Lisboa: Media XXI, 2008, 306 pp. ISBN 9789898143112
- "Innovación en los medios: la ruta del cambio", Barañáin (Navarra): EUNSA, 2012, 326 pp. ISBN 9788431328597. Con Francisco Javier Pérez-Latre.
