= Charlton Athletic F.C. Under-21s and Academy =

English football youth system

Charlton Athletic Under 21s
- Full name: Charlton Athletic Football Club (Under-21 Development Squad and Academy)
- Nickname: The young Addicks
- Founded: 1905 (Reserves); 1998 (Academy)
- Ground: Sparrows Lane, New Eltham, London
- League: Professional Development League 2 (South Division)
Home colours	Away colours	Third colours

The Charlton Athletic Academy refers to the teams and players in the youth system of English professional football club Charlton Athletic; they play the majority of their home games at the club's training ground Sparrows Lane in New Eltham, south-east London.

The Under-21 Development side consists mainly of Charlton's academy players who are aiming to break into the first team squad and in the near future, while senior players occasionally play when returning from injury. The current senior professional development coach for the under-21 squad is Chris Lock. They compete in the Professional Development League 2; the club's Under-18 team plays in the same category of the lower age group.

== Under-21s squad ==
=== Current squad ===
As of 22 November 2026

Note: Flags indicate national team as defined under FIFA eligibility rules; some limited exceptions apply. Players may hold more than one non-FIFA nationality.

No.	Pos.	Nation	Player
38	DF	FIJ	Josh Laqeretabua
39	MF	FIN	Otto Tiitinen (on loan from Ilves)
53	FW	ENG	Bradley Tagoe
62	FW	ENG	Josh Hebert
—	GK	ENG	George Hardy
—	GK	SCO	Lyndon Tas
—	GK	ENG	Finley Woodham
—	DF	ENG	Ethan Brown
—	DF	ENG	Dionte Davis
—	DF	ENG	Ty Ewens-Findlay
—	DF	ENG	Tate Elliott
—	DF	ENG	Marley Rayment-Dawkins

No.	Pos.	Nation	Player
—	DF	ENG	Phoenix Valentine
—	MF	ENG	Jack Belton
—	MF	ENG	Kai Enslin
—	MF	JAM	Nehmani McNamee-Burke
—	MF	ENG	Henry Rylah
—	MF	ENG	Jacob Safa
—	MF	ENG	Manu Wales
—	MF	ENG	Sam Washington-Amoah
—	FW	ENG	Shia-Lee Burnham
—	FW	ENG	Ellis McMillan
—	FW	ENG	Reuben Reid
—	FW	ENG	Emmanuel Sol-Loza

== Academy history ==
The Charlton Athletic Youth Academy was a development of Charlton's commitment to develop young players, a scheme which started in the early-mid-1990s when there was an explosion of young talent under joint managers Steve Gritt and Alan Curbishley. Notable players such as Scott Minto, Kim Grant, Anthony Barness, Lee Bowyer, Richard Rufus, Linvoy Primus, Shaun Newton, Jermain Defoe, Jlloyd Samuel, Jamie Stuart, Kevin Lisbie, Paul Konchesky and Scott Parker all came through the ranks.

This was followed by the creation of the Youth Academy in 1998, aiming to find the best local, and worldwide talent to bring to Charlton at a young age. Numerous players have gone on to play in the top two tiers of English football, having begun their footballing career at the Charlton Youth Academy, including Carl Jenkinson, Harry Arter, Tareiq Holmes-Dennis, Kasey Palmer, Michael Turner, Robert Elliot, Jonjo Shelvey, Jordan Cousins, Callum Harriott, Darren Randolph, Joe Gomez, Ademola Lookman, Morgan Fox, Dillon Phillips, Ezri Konsa, Karlan Ahearne-Grant, Chris Solly and Harry Lennon.

The Under-18 team play in the U18 Professional Development League 2 however the academy takes boys from the ages of nine upwards.

=== Valley Gold ===
The Valley Gold scheme was previously set up to aid Charlton's return to The Valley. When a supporter signs up to the scheme, they now have the opportunity to win up to £15,000 at half-time on home match days, as well as getting £15 off the price of their season ticket and the opportunity to have first priority to away games or high demand home matches.

Since Charlton's return to the Valley in December 1992 the scheme has since been used to give financial support to the Charlton Youth Academy, to help nurture Charlton stars of the future.

== Under 18s squad ==
=== Current squad ===
As of 22 November 2026

Note: Flags indicate national team as defined under FIFA eligibility rules; some limited exceptions apply. Players may hold more than one non-FIFA nationality.

No.	Pos.	Nation	Player
—	GK	ENG	Logan Williams
—	DF	ENG	Noah Grover-Smith
—	DF	ENG	Theo Laronde
—	DF	ENG	Ayden Minto-St Aimie
—	DF	ENG	Taku Muvhuti
—	DF	NIR	Cameron Reid
—	DF	ENG	Mikhail Simons
—	MF	ENG	Patrick Boje
—	MF	ENG	Zaino Christian

No.	Pos.	Nation	Player
—	MF	ENG	Kit Fleming
—	MF	ENG	Michael Mylona
—	MF	ENG	Kacper Podgorny
—	MF	ENG	Harry Randall
—	MF	ENG	Ed Thomas
—	FW	ENG	Kayode Peterkin
—	FW	ENG	Raynon Richman
—	FW	ENG	Jayden Twum

== Coaching staff ==
Role	Name
Academy Director	(England) Steve Avory
Academy Manager	(England) Tom Pell
Head of Coaching (U9–U16)	(Wales) Rhys Williams
Senior Professional Development Lead Coach (U21)	(England) Chris Lock
Senior Professional Development Lead Coach (U18)	(England) Jason Pearce
Lead Youth Development Phase Coach (U15–U16)	(England) Kieran Culleton
Youth Development Phase Coach (U12–U14)	(England) Daniel Gill
Academy Recruitment Manager	(England) Bert Dawkins
Head of Youth Academy Sports Science	(England) Alex Brown
Lead Academy Sports Scientist	(England) William Groom
Academy Physiotherapist	(England) Ashar Magoba
Performance Analyst (Development Squad)	(England) Daniel Mahony
Academy Performance Analyst	(England) Tidjane Balde
Kit Assistant	(England) Sam Perre

== Reserve team history ==
From 1999 until 2007, Charlton Reserves were members of the FA Premier Reserve League Southern; however, due to the relegation of the first team at the end of the 2006–07 season from the Premier League to the Football League Championship, they were demoted to the Football Combination Central where they played against other Football League reserve teams and successful Football Conference reserve sides. At the end of the 2008–09 season the first team were relegated to Football League One and the reserve side was dissolved as a competitive team.

=== Under Glynn Snodin ===
In 1999, the team joined the FA Premier Reserve League Southern. Led by reserve-team coach Glynn Snodin had relative success in their first season, finishing 2nd, however in comparison the next three seasons were disappointing as the club finished 8th, 7th and 7th respectively. After this however, things picked up, and Charlton became unexpected winners of the league in 2003–04, and this was then followed by a second success as the Charlton team won the division again in 2004–05, just a season later. This was followed by another good season, seeing the Addicks finish fourth, however popular reserve-team coach Snodin left to join Southampton as first-team coach. Snodin was replaced by Mark Robson for the remainder; however, this was short-lived as Charlton faced a managerial re-shuffle after the resignation of Alan Curbishley, Mervyn Day and Keith Peacock.

=== Under Mark Kinsella ===
With the installation of Iain Dowie as head-coach, Robson was moved to development coach, working with both the Reserve & First Team sides, however after Dowie was fired he was named assistant head-coach, under Les Reed. Mark Kinsella replaced Robson as development coach until this hiring of current club manager Alan Pardew when Kinsella was moved to reserve-team coach. Despite a hectic season the team still managed to finish 6th, however due to the relegation of the first-team the club were demoted to the Football Combination Central where after spending much of the season top of the table were pipped to the post by Southampton Reserves on the last game of the season.

In 2008, Mark Kinsella moved to a more senior role within the first team under Caretaker manager Phil Parkinson while the club sought after a replacement for Alan Pardew, who parted company with the club on 22 November 2008. He was replaced by the club's U18 Youth Coach, Damian Matthew, for the interim period. When Parkinson assumed the role of first team manager Matthew was designated Development coach, based on the same role Mark Robson had held previously.

In 2009, the reserve team was disbanded as a competitive side. With the relegation of the first team from the Football League Championship to the Football League One it was decided that the team would no longer play in the Football Combination and instead only played a number of friendly matches throughout the season.

=== Home ground ===
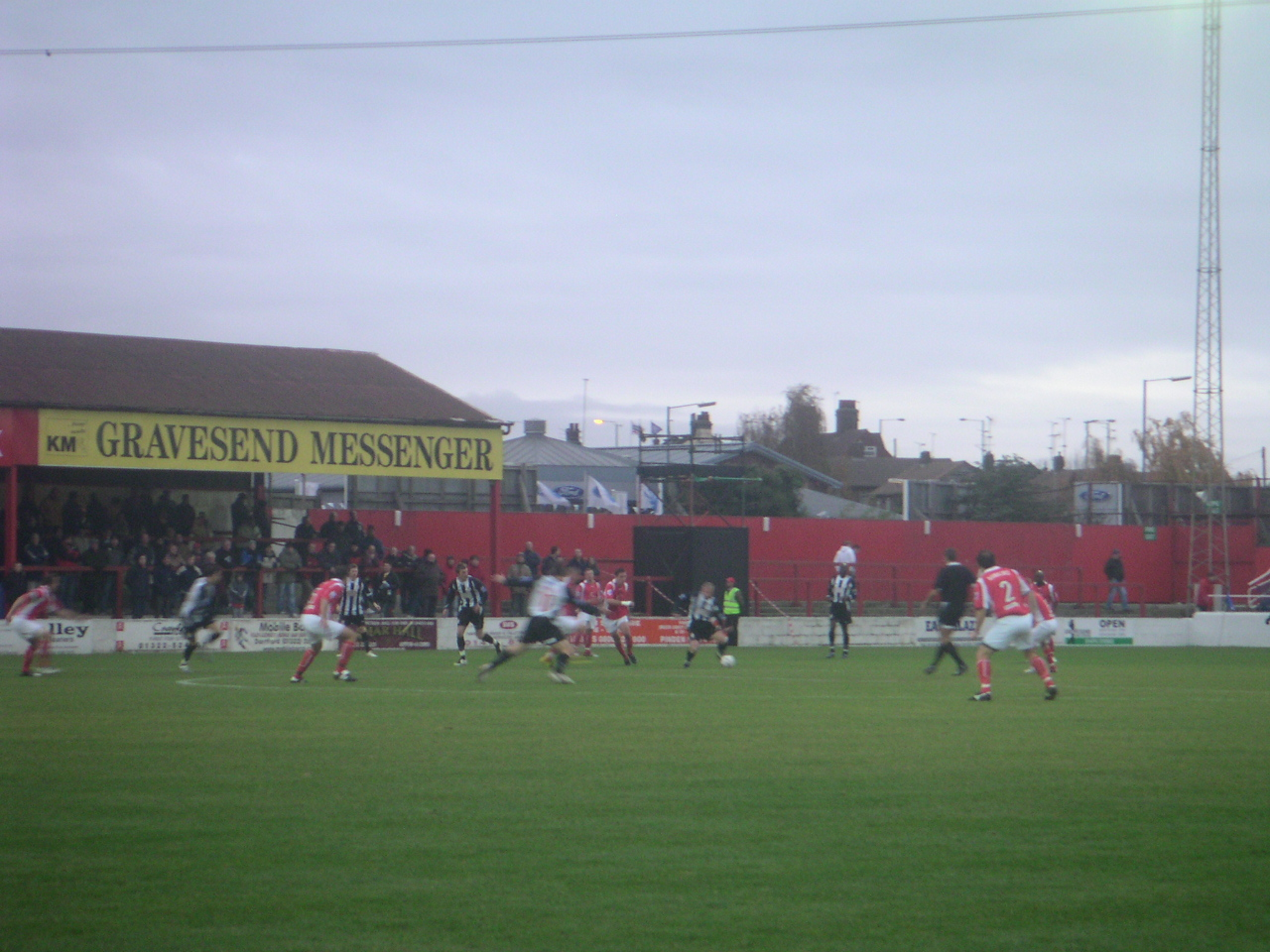
Stonebridge Road, November 2007

In the last nine years the reserves had many different stadia. In their first season they played their matches at Welling United's ground, Park View Road, but the stay was short-lived. For the 2000–01 season the reserve team played their matches at the first-team's ground, The Valley, however when there was a clash in matches the reserve teams would play their games at Park View Road. This system continued until the 2006–07 season, when the team moved their matches to Gravesend & Northfleet's ground, Stonebridge Road. The reserve team continued to play their games there in the 2007–08 season, after the change of club name from Gravesend & Northfleet to Ebbsfleet United.

=== Reserve team managers ===
Name	Dates	Achievements
(England) Glynn Snodin	2000 – March 2006	Premier Reserve League South Champions (2003–04, 2004–05)
(England) Mark Robson (as Development Coach)	March 2006 – November 2006
(Republic of Ireland) Mark Kinsella	November 2006 – November 2008	Football Combination Central Runners Up (2007–08)
(England) Damian Matthew (as Development Coach)	November 2008 – January 2011

=== Recent reserves seasons ===
Season by season record (1999–2008)
Season	Competition	P	W	D	L	F	A	Pts	Pos
1999–00	Premier Reserve League Southern	24	15	2	7	57	36	47	2/13
2000–01	Premier Reserve League Southern	24	8	6	10	35	44	30	8/13
2001–02	Premier Reserve League Southern	26	9	7	10	37	41	34	7/14
2002–03	Premier Reserve League Southern	26	10	4	12	40	37	34	7/14
2003–04	Premier Reserve League Southern	28	17	6	5	46	19	57	1/15
2004–05	Premier Reserve League Southern	28	18	7	3	46	21	61	1/15
2005–06	Premier Reserve League Southern	26	14	4	8	38	29	46	4/14
2006–07	Premier Reserve League Southern	18	7	4	7	28	24	25	6/10
2007–08	Football Combination Central	18	12	4	3	39	17	37	2/10
2008–09	Football Combination Central	18	7	2	9	25	25	23	7/10

== Notable players ==
=== National Team Caps ===
- Semi Ajayi Nigeria U20/Nigeria
- Karoy Anderson Jamaica
- Wassim Aouachria Algeria U18
- Harry Arter Republic of Ireland U17/19/Republic of Ireland
- Ade Azeez England U19
- Grant Basey Wales U17/19/21
- Daniel Bowry Antigua and Barbuda
- Lee Bowyer England U18/21/England
- Jason Brown Wales U21/Wales
- Mason Burstow England U20
- Tyreece Campbell Jamaica
- Jamal Campbell-Ryce Jamaica
- Michael Carvill Northern Ireland U21
- Regan Charles-Cook Grenada
- Jordan Cousins England U16/17/18/20 & Jamaica
- Harry Doherty Republic of Ireland U17
- Rob Elliot Republic of Ireland U19/Republic of Ireland
- Simon Ford Jamaica
- Morgan Fox Wales U21
- Hady Ghandour Lebanon U16/19/Lebanon
- Joe Gomez England U16/17/19/21/England
- Karlan Grant England U17/18/19
- Kim Grant Ghana
- Ruairi Harkin Republic of Ireland U16/17/19
- Callum Harriott England U19 & Guyana
- Tareiq Holmes-Dennis England U18
- Carl Jenkinson England U17/U21/England & Finland U19/21
- Daniel Kanu Sierra Leone
- Mikhail Kennedy Northern Ireland U17/19/21
- Paul Konchesky England U18/21/England
- Ezri Konsa England U20/21/England
- Joshua Laqeretabua Fiji U20
- Kevin Lisbie Jamaica
- Ademola Lookman England U19/20/21 & Nigeria
- Stacy Long England U16/17/18/19/20
- Micah Mbick England U20
- Sean McGinty Republic of Ireland U17/19/21
- Dimitar Mitov Bulgaria U16/17/19/Bulgaria
- (Republic of Ireland) Keiran Murtagh Ireland U17 & Antigua and Barbuda
- Shaun Newton England U21
- Kevin Nicholls England U18/20
- Kasey Palmer England U17/18/20/21 & Jamaica
- Scott Parker England U16/18/21/England
- Diego Poyet England U16/17 & Uruguay U20
- Darren Randolph Republic of Ireland U21/Republic of Ireland
- Richard Rufus England U21
- Lloyd Sam England U20 & Ghana
- Osei Sankofa England U16/17/18/19/20
- Jonjo Shelvey England U16/17/19/21/England
- Tobi Sho-Silva England U18
- Chris Solly England U16/17
- Alex Stavrinou Cyprus U17
- Jamie Stuart England U18/21
- (Saint Lucia) Terell Thomas St Lucia
- Tamer Tuna Turkey U19
- Daniel Uchechi Nigeria U20/23
- James Walker England U18 & Antigua and Barbuda
- Myles Weston England U16/17/18/19 & Antigua and Barbuda
- Josh Wright England U16/17/18/19
- Rashid Yussuff England U16/17/18

=== Other academy graduates ===
- (England) Kasim Aidoo
- (England) Nathan Ashton
- (England) Aaron Barnes
- (England) Anthony Barness
- (England) Steve Brown
- (England) Dean Chandler
- (England) Ben Dempsey
- (England) Alfie Doughty
- (England) Kai Enslin
- (England) Jonathan Fortune
- (England) Barry Fuller
- (Republic of Ireland) Dylan Gavin
- (England) Adam Gross
- (England) Brandon Hanlan
- (England) Alistair John
- (England) Jason Lee
- (England) Harry Lennon
- (England) Paul Linger
- (England) Sam Long
- (Republic of Ireland) Neil McCafferty
- (England) Charlie MacDonald
- (England) Yado Mambo
- (England) Ollie Muldoon
- (England) Harry Pell
- (England) Dillon Phillips
- (England) Joe Pigott
- (England) Johl Powell
- (England) Linvoy Primus
- (Guinea-Bissau) Junior Quitirna
- (England) Henry Rylah
- (Nigeria) Onome Sodje
- (England) Donovan Simmonds
- (England) Paul Sturgess
- (England) Jason Tindall
- (England) Aswad Thomas
- (England) Michael Turner
- (England) Josh Umerah
- (England) James Vennings
- (England) Scott Wagstaff
- (England) Freddie Warren
- (England) Lawrie Wilson
- (England) Brendan Wiredu

== Honours ==
=== Reserve team/Under-23s ===
Competition	Achievement	Year
Premier Reserve League South	Champions	2003–04, 2004–05
Football Combination Central	Runners-up	2007–08
Professional Development League 2	National Champions	2013

=== Youth ===
Competition	Achievement	Year
FA Youth Cup	Finalists	1987
Professional Development League 2	South Division Champions	2013, 2014, 2015, 2021, 2022, 2023, 2024, 2026
Professional Development League 2	National Champions	2015, 2016, 2018, 2026
