= 2020–21 Professional U18 Development League =

== U18 Premier League ==
U18 Premier League
- Season: 2020–21
- Champions: Manchester City U18s (2nd Title)
- Matches: 313
- Goals: 1,301 (4.16 per match)
- Top goalscorer: (England) Charlie McNeill Manchester United U18s (24 Goals)
- Biggest home win: Chelsea U18s 8–1 Leicester City U18s (7 November 2020); Manchester United U18s 8–1 Middlesbrough U18s (8 May 2021)
- Biggest away win: Leicester City U18s 0–8 Fulham U18s (1 May 2021)
- Highest scoring: Southampton U18s 8–2 Leicester City U18s (17 October 2020); Aston Villa U18s 6–4 West Bromwich Albion U18s (20 April 2021); Southampton U18s 6–4 Reading U18s (8 May 2021)
- Longest winning run: 9 Matches Fulham U18s
- Longest unbeaten run: 13 Matches Manchester City U18s
- Longest winless run: 16 Matches Southampton U18s
- Longest losing run: 8 Matches Reading U18s

The 2020–21 Professional U18 Development League was the ninth season of the Professional Development League system. A total of 26 teams are split regionally into north and south leagues. Teams face their regional opponents both home and away before the top two face each other to determine the national champion. This results in 24 games played by both teams this season. Burnley U18s, Crystal Palace U18s and Leeds United U18s joined the U18 Premier League for the 2020–21 season after gaining category one status academies. Prior to the start of the season Swansea City left the league after downgrading their academy to category two.

=== North ===
Pos	Team	Pld	W	D	L	GF	GA	GD	Pts	
1	Manchester City U18s (C, Q)	24	19	4	1	76	19	+57	61	Qualification for the National Final
2	Manchester United U18s	24	20	0	4	79	27	+52	60	
3	Liverpool U18s	24	17	1	6	75	26	+49	52	
4	Middlesbrough U18s	24	12	3	9	48	48	0	39	
5	Everton U18s	24	11	2	11	42	42	0	35	
6	Blackburn Rovers U18s	24	10	3	11	37	43	−6	33	
7	Derby County U18s	24	10	3	11	43	54	−11	33	
8	Wolverhampton Wanderers U18s	24	10	3	11	38	50	−12	33	
9	Burnley U18s	24	8	4	12	34	38	−4	28	
10	Newcastle United U18s	24	7	3	14	50	57	−7	24	
11	Stoke City U18s	24	6	5	13	28	61	−33	23	
12	Leeds United U18s	24	4	3	17	30	73	−43	15	
13	Sunderland U18s	24	4	2	18	35	77	−42	14	

Updated to match(es) played on unknown. Source: Premier League Under 18 Table
(C) Champions; (Q) Qualified for the phase indicated

=== South ===
Pos	Team	Pld	W	D	L	GF	GA	GD	Pts	
1	Fulham U18s (C, Q)	24	18	2	4	78	25	+53	56	Qualification for the National Final
2	Crystal Palace U18s	24	18	2	4	67	32	+35	56	
3	Brighton & Hove Albion U18s	24	14	3	7	63	40	+23	45	
4	Arsenal U18s	24	12	4	8	52	45	+7	40	
5	Aston Villa U18s	24	11	5	8	45	52	−7	38	
6	Tottenham Hotspur U18s	24	10	7	7	52	37	+15	37	
7	Chelsea U18s	24	11	3	10	57	43	+14	36	
8	West Bromwich Albion U18s	24	9	3	12	51	62	−11	30	
9	Norwich City U18s	24	9	2	13	58	58	0	29	
10	West Ham United U18s	24	6	7	11	35	57	−22	25	
11	Reading U18s	24	5	4	15	51	83	−32	19	
12	Leicester City U18s	24	4	6	14	38	73	−35	18	
13	Southampton U18s	24	3	4	17	35	75	−40	13	

Updated to match(es) played on unknown. Source: Premier League Under 18 Table
(C) Champions; (Q) Qualified for the phase indicated

=== National Final ===
22 May 2021
8:00

Manchester City U18s	3–1	Fulham U18s
Edozie 3'; Forbs 7'; Bobb 45+2'	Report	Pajaziti 49' (pen.)

Academy Stadium, Manchester
Referee: Jordan Crossley

== Season statistics ==
=== Top goalscorers ===
As of 17 May 2025

Rank	Player	Club	Goals
1	(England) Charlie McNeill	Manchester United U18s	24
2	(Denmark) Mika Biereth	Fulham U18s	21
2	(England) David Omilabu	Crystal Palace U18s	21
3	(England) Tai Sodje	Manchester City U18s	19
4	(England) Dane Scarlett	Tottenham Hotspur U18s	17
5	(Scotland) Kieron Bowie	Fulham U18s	15
5	(England) Layton Stewart	Liverpool U18s	15
6	(Thailand) Jude Soonsup-Bell	Chelsea U18s	14
7	(Portugal) Carlos Forbs	Manchester City U18s	13
7	(Republic of Ireland) Calum Kavanagh	Middlesbrough U18s	13
7	(England) Brad Young	Aston Villa U18s	13
8	(Netherlands) Dillon Hoogewerf	Manchester United U18s	12
9	(England) Josh Coburn	Middlesbrough U18s	11
9	(England) Zac Emmerson	Brighton & Hove Albion U18s	11
9	(England) Micah Hamilton	Manchester City U18s	11
9	(Republic of Ireland) Andrew Moran	Brighton & Hove Albion U18s	11

=== Hat-tricks ===
As of 22 May 2021

Player	For	Against	Result	Date	Ref.
(Scotland) Thomas Dickson-Peters	Norwich City U18s	West Bromwich Albion U18s	5–1 (H)	12 September 2020	
(England) Layton Stewart	Liverpool U18s	Stoke City U18s	5–1 (H)	19 September 2020	
(England) Tai Sodje	Manchester City U18s	Liverpool U18s	1–3 (A)	26 September 2020	
(England) Josh Coburn	Middlesbrough U18s	Sunderland U18s	4–0 (H)	26 September 2020	
(England) Layton Stewart	Liverpool U18s	Blackburn Rovers U18s	0–3 (A)	3 October 2020	
(England) Sam Bellis	Southampton U18s	Leicester City U18s	8–2 (H)	17 October 2020	
(England) Kido Taylor-Hart	Arsenal U18s	Norwich City U18s	5–1 (H)	31 October 2020	
(Republic of Ireland) Andrew Moran	Brighton & Hove Albion U18s	Leicester City U18s	7–1 (H)	31 October 2020	
(England) Sam Unwin	Burnley U18s	Leeds United U18s	3–2 (H)	31 October 2020	
(Thailand) Jude Soonsup-Bell^{4}	Chelsea U18s	Leicester City U18s	8–1 (H)	7 November 2020	
(England) Dane Scarlett^{4}	Tottenham Hotspur U18s	Southampton U18s	7–0 (H)	21 November 2020	
(England) Kaide Gordon	Derby County U18s	Blackburn Rovers U18s	5–1 (H)	28 November 2020	
(Netherlands) Dillon Hoogewerf	Manchester United U18s	Newcastle United U18s	4–1 (H)	28 November 2020	
(England) Dane Scarlett	Tottenham Hotspur U18s	Crystal Palace U18s	1–5 (A)	5 December 2020	
(Australia) Alexander Robertson^{4}	Manchester City U18s	Derby County U18s	7–0 (H)	15 December 2020	
(Republic of Ireland) Zak Gilsenan	Blackburn Rovers U18s	Manchester United U18s	3–4 (H)	23 January 2021	
(England) Terell Pennant	Leicester City U18s	Norwich City U18s	4–3 (H)	30 January 2021	
(England) Charlie McNeill^{4}	Manchester United U18s	Manchester City U18s	4–2 (H)	13 February 2021	
(Denmark) Mika Biereth	Fulham U18s	Tottenham Hotspur U18s	5–0 (H)	17 February 2021	
(Denmark) Mika Biereth	Fulham U18s	Aston Villa U18s	4–1 (H)	27 February 2021	
(England) Lui Bradbury	Leeds United U18s	Wolverhampton Wanderers U18s	3–1 (H)	27 February 2021	
(Scotland) Michael Mellon	Burnley U18s	Sunderland U18s	4–0 (H)	27 February 2021	
(England) Roshaun Mathurin	Tottenham Hotspur U18s	Chelsea U18s	1–6 (A)	6 March 2021	
(England) David Omilabu	Crystal Palace U18s	West Ham United U18s	5–1 (H)	7 April 2021	
(England) Divin Mubama	West Ham United U18s	Reading U18s	4–1 (H)	10 April 2021	
(Argentina) Alejandro Garnacho	Manchester United U18s	Stoke City U18s	6–1 (H)	10 April 2021	
(England) Myles Peart-Harris	Chelsea U18s	Aston Villa U18s	0–7 (A)	10 April 2021	
(England) Brad Young^{4}	Aston Villa U18s	West Bromwich Albion U18s	6–4 (H)	20 April 2021	
(England) Luke Plange	Derby County U18s	Leeds United U18s	5–0 (H)	24 April 2021	
(England) Dylan Stephenson	Newcastle United U18s	Sunderland U18s	4–4 (A)	1 May 2021	
(Denmark) Mika Biereth	Fulham U18s	Leicester City U18s	0–8 (A)	1 May 2021	
(England) Charlie McNeill	Manchester United U18s	Middlesbrough U18s	8–1 (H)	8 May 2021	
(Netherlands) Dillon Hoogewerf	Manchester United U18s	Middlesbrough U18s	8–1 (H)	8 May 2021	

Note

(H) – Home; (A) – Away
^{4} – player scored 4 goals

== Professional Development League 2 ==
U18 Professional Development League 2
- Season: 2020–21
- Champions: Wigan Athletic U18s (1st Title)
- Matches: 228 (225 RS, 3 PO)
- Goals: 927 (4.07 per match) (917 RS, 10 PO)
- Top goalscorer: (England) Tom Costello Wigan Athletic U18s (20 Goals)
- Biggest home win: Nottingham Forest U18s 7–0 Queens Park Rangers U18s (24 October 2020; Millwall U18s 7–0 Queens Park Rangers U18s (12 December 2020)
- Biggest away win: Ipswich Town U18s 0–6 Colchester United U18s (30 March 2021)
- Highest scoring: Coventry City U18s 4–7 Birmingham City U18s (20 October 2020); Hull City U18s 6–5 Sheffield United U18s (2 March 2021)
- Longest winning run: 11 Matches Charlton Athletic U18s (20 February 2021 – 1 May 2021)
- Longest unbeaten run: 12 Matches Charlton Athletic U18s (20 February 2021 – 4 May 2021); Wigan Athletic U18s (12 September 2020 – 20 February 2021)
- Longest winless run: 9 Matches Queens Park Rangers U18s (20 November 2020 – 13 March 2021)
- Longest losing run: 9 Matches Queens Park Rangers U18s (20 November 2020 – 13 March 2021)

The 2020-21 Under-18 League 2, or Under-18s Professional Development League 2 as it is sometimes referred to, is the seventh campaign of post-EPPP Under-18 football's second tier, designed for those academies with Category 2 status. The league is split regionally into north and south divisions, with each team facing opponents in their own region twice both home and away and opponents in the other region once home OR away. This results in 25 games being played in the North Division, and South Division. The sides finishing in the top two positions in both regions at the end of the season will progress to a knockout stage to determine the overall league champion. Wigan Athletic U18s and Millwall U18s are the defending regional champions. 18 teams competed in the league this season. Swansea City U18s dropped down to Category Two status in August 2020 and will join the South division this season.

=== Tables ===
==== North Division ====
Pos	Team	Pld	W	D	L	GF	GA	GD	Pts	Qualification
1	Wigan Athletic U18s	25	17	4	4	68	38	+30	55	Qualification for Knock-out stage
2	Birmingham City U18s	25	16	4	5	67	44	+23	52	Qualification for Knock-out stage
3	Sheffield United U18s	25	15	5	5	63	36	+27	50	
4	Sheffield Wednesday U18s	25	12	6	7	48	30	+18	42	
5	Barnsley U18s	25	12	6	7	46	34	+12	42	
6	Crewe Alexandra U18s	25	10	4	11	50	47	+3	34	
7	Hull City U18s	25	10	3	12	46	58	−12	33	
8	Coventry City U18s	25	9	3	13	50	46	+4	30	
9	Nottingham Forest U18s	25	9	3	13	45	56	−11	30	

==== South Division ====
Pos	Team	Pld	W	D	L	GF	GA	GD	Pts	Qualification
1	Charlton Athletic U18s	25	16	3	6	65	34	+31	51	Qualification for Knock-out stage
2	Ipswich Town U18s	25	13	2	10	53	54	−1	41	Qualification for Knock-out stage
3	Watford U18s	25	9	5	11	40	46	−6	32	
4	Millwall U18s	25	9	4	12	56	58	−2	31	
5	Cardiff City U18s	25	10	1	14	54	58	−4	31	
6	Bristol City U18s	25	9	2	14	44	53	−9	29	
7	Colchester United U18s	25	9	1	15	52	64	−12	28	
8	Swansea City U18s	25	5	7	13	37	73	−36	22	
9	Queens Park Rangers U18s	25	3	1	21	33	88	−55	10	

=== Knock-out stage ===
Semi-finals

15 May 2021

Wigan Athletic U18s	2–1 (a.e.t.)	Ipswich Town U18s
Costello 2'; McHugh 107' (pen.)	Report	Buabo 49'

Christopher Park, Wigan
15 May 2021

Charlton Athletic U18s	3–2	Birmingham City U18s
Henry 9'; Burstow 71', 90+1'	Report	Wakefield 85', 88'

The Valley, London

Professional Development League Two Play-Off Final

21 May 2021

Charlton Athletic U18s	0–2	Wigan Athletic U18s
	Report	Fulton 7'; Brown 74'

The Valley, London
Attendance: 592

=== Top goalscorers ===
As of 21 May 2021

Rank	Player	Club	Goals
1	(England) Tom Costello	Wigan Athletic U18s	20
2	(England) Harrison Nee	Coventry City U18s	18
3	(England) Tom Stagg	Colchester United U18s	17
4	(England) Oli Bate	Millwall U18s	14
4	(Wales) James Crole	Cardiff City U18s	14
4	(England) Sean McGurk	Wigan Athletic U18s	14
7	(England) Abdul Abdulmalik	Millwall U18s	13
8	(England) Alex Bonnington	Sheffield Wednesday U18s	12
8	(England) Will Lankshear	Sheffield United U18s	12
8	(England) Kieran Wakefield	Birmingham City U18s	12
11	(Tunisia) Hassan Ayari	Sheffield United U18s	10
11	(England) Ola Bello	Ipswich Town U18s	10
11	(Jamaica) Tyreece Campbell	Charlton Athletic U18s	10
14	(England) George Hall	Birmingham City U18s	9
14	(England) Rico Patterson	Birmingham City U18s	9
14	(England) Damani Hunter	Watford U18s	9
14	(England) Detlef Esapa Osong	Nottingham Forest U18s	9

=== Hat-tricks ===
As of 21 May 2021

Player	For	Against	Result	Date	Ref.
(England) Tom Stagg^{4}	Colchester United U18s	Watford U18s	2–7 (A)	19 September 2020	
(England) Harrison Nee	Coventry City U18s	Queens Park Rangers U18s	1–6 (A)	17 October 2020	
(England) Tom Costello	Wigan Athletic U18s	Colchester United U18s	1–5 (A)	17 October 2020	
(Northern Ireland) Dale Taylor	Nottingham Forest U18s	Queens Park Rangers U18s	7–0 (H)	24 October 2020	
(England) Fin Back	Nottingham Forest U18s	Cardiff City U18s	6–2 (H)	7 November 2020	
(England) Sean McGurk	Wigan Athletic U18s	Crewe Alexandra U18s	5–1 (H)	21 November 2020	
(England) Alex Bonnington	Sheffield Wednesday U18s	Colchester United U18s	6–0 (H)	5 December 2020	
(England) Charlie Finney	Crewe Alexandra U18s	Hull City U18s	1–6 (A)	19 December 2020	
(England) Oli Bate	Millwall U18s	Bristol City U18s	6–1 (H)	9 January 2021	
(England) Remi Walker	Birmingham City U18s	Crewe Alexandra U18s	2–5 (A)	16 January 2021	
(England) Detlef Esapa Osong	Nottingham Forest U18s	Wigan Athletic U18s	3–2 (H)	27 February 2021	
(England) Will Lankshear	Sheffield United U18s	Coventry City U18s	1–4 (A)	27 February 2021	
(Northern Ireland) Euan Williams	Charlton Athletic U18s	Colchester United U18s	5–2 (A)	27 February 2021	
(England) McCauley Snelgrove	Hull City U18s	Sheffield United U18s	6–5 (H)	2 March 2021	
(England) Oli Bate	Millwall U18s	Queens Park Rangers U18s	0–4 (A)	6 March 2021	
(England) McCauley Snelgrove	Hull City U18s	Crewe Alexandra U18s	3–4 (A)	13 March 2021	
(England) Jack Sherlock	Barnsley U18s	Queens Park Rangers U18s	1–3 (A)	20 March 2021	
(Jamaica) Bailey Cadamarteri	Sheffield Wednesday U18s	Ipswich Town U18s	1–5 (A)	20 March 2021	
(England) Alex Bonnington	Sheffield Wednesday U18s	Hull City U18s	3–0 (H)	27 March 2021	
(England) Tom Stagg	Colchester United U18s	Ipswich Town U18s	0–6 (A)	30 March 2021	
(England) Tom Leahy	Millwall U18s	Swansea City U18s	4–4 (A)	6 April 2021	
(Spain) Leo Dos Reis	Birmingham City U18s	Ipswich Town U18s	4–2 (H)	24 April 2021	
(England) Detlef Esapa Osong	Nottingham Forest U18s	Millwall U18s	2–5 (A)	1 May 2021	
(Australia) Marlee Francois^{4}	Bristol City U18s	Charlton Athletic U18s	2–4 (A)	8 May 2021	
(Wales) James Crole	Cardiff City U18s	Ipswich Town U18s	6–0 (H)	8 May 2021	

Note

(H) – Home; (A) – Away
^{4} – player scored 4 goals

== EFL Youth Alliance ==
Football League Youth Alliance
- Season: 2020-21
- Champions: North-East Division; Notts County U18s; North-West Division; Fleetwood Town U18s; South-East Division; Peterborough United U18s; South-West Division; Oxford United U18s; Merit League One; Plymouth Argyle U18s; Merit League Two; Southend United U18s; Merit League Three'; AFC Bournemouth U18s
- Matches: 555
- Goals: 2,116 (3.81 per match)
- Top goalscorer: (England) Sam Fishburn Carlisle United U18s (22 Goals)

The EFL Youth Alliance is run by the Football League under the auspices of the Football League Youth Alliance. 45 teams competed this season, 2 teams fewer than the previous season. Barnet U18s did not participate as they lost their EPPP license, alongside Chesterfield U18s, and Hartlepool United U18s. For clubs that get relegated to the National League, they have two years to gain promotion back to the EFL. Otherwise, they lose their license with the League. Bolton Wanderers U18s would join the league this year as their academy was Category 3.

=== League stage ===
As of match played 15 May 2021

==== North-East Division ====
Pos	Team	Pld	W	D	L	GF	GA	GD	Pts
1	Notts County U18s (C)	22	15	2	5	53	32	+21	47
2	Scunthorpe United U18s	22	13	1	8	52	47	+5	40
3	Grimsby Town U18s	22	10	6	6	32	24	+8	36
4	Mansfield Town U18s	22	11	1	10	34	30	+4	34
5	Burton Albion U18s	22	10	3	9	36	40	−4	33
6	Rotherham United U18s	22	10	2	10	46	41	+5	32
7	Doncaster Rovers U18s	22	8	2	12	38	40	−2	26
8	Lincoln City U18s	22	8	2	12	36	38	−2	26
9	Bradford City U18s	22	8	1	13	38	50	−12	25
10	Huddersfield Town U18s	22	7	0	15	32	55	−23	21

Source: soccerway.com
(C) Champions

==== North-West Division ====
Pos	Team	Pld	W	D	L	GF	GA	GD	Pts
1	Fleetwood Town U18s (C)	26	19	1	6	62	36	+26	58
2	Rochdale U18s	26	17	3	6	64	29	+35	54
3	Carlisle United U18s	26	17	3	6	55	27	+28	54
4	Blackpool U18s	26	15	4	7	59	43	+16	49
5	Preston North End U18s	26	14	3	9	73	51	+22	45
6	Bolton Wanderers U18s	26	13	5	8	55	43	+12	44
7	Shrewsbury Town U18s	26	11	5	10	42	45	−3	38
8	Salford City U18s	26	10	1	15	46	59	−13	31
9	Walsall U18s	26	9	4	13	31	56	−25	31
10	Morecambe U18s	26	8	5	13	32	49	−17	29
11	Tranmere Rovers U18s	26	7	5	14	38	51	−13	26
12	Accrington Stanley U18s	26	6	6	14	41	57	−16	24
13	Oldham Athletic U18s	26	6	3	17	41	59	−18	21
14	Port Vale U18s	26	4	4	18	36	70	−34	16

Source: soccerway.com
(C) Champions

==== South-East Division ====
Pos	Team	Pld	W	D	L	GF	GA	GD	Pts
1	Peterborough United U18s (C)	18	11	4	3	39	16	+23	37
2	Cambridge United U18s	18	10	2	6	37	27	+10	32
3	Luton Town U18s	18	8	6	4	39	25	+14	30
4	Southend United U18s	18	9	3	6	35	25	+10	30
5	Northampton Town U18s	18	8	5	5	32	20	+12	29
6	Gillingham U18s	18	7	5	6	26	27	−1	26
7	AFC Wimbledon U18s	18	6	4	8	27	34	−7	22
8	Milton Keynes Dons U18s	18	5	2	11	26	45	−19	17
9	Stevenage U18s	18	3	6	9	27	45	−18	15
10	Leyton Orient U18s	18	2	5	11	23	47	−24	11

Source: soccerway.com
(C) Champions

==== South-West Division ====
Pos	Team	Pld	W	D	L	GF	GA	GD	Pts
1	Oxford United U18s (C)	20	15	2	3	58	24	+34	47
2	AFC Bournemouth U18s	20	13	3	4	62	27	+35	42
3	Exeter City U18s	20	10	4	6	43	36	+7	34
4	Portsmouth U18s	20	9	5	6	49	40	+9	32
5	Forest Green Rovers U18s	20	8	5	7	54	48	+6	29
6	Plymouth Argyle U18s	20	8	4	8	51	40	+11	28
7	Swindon Town U18s	20	6	4	10	33	43	−10	22
8	Bristol Rovers U18s	20	6	4	10	32	45	−13	22
9	Newport County U18s	20	5	5	10	35	44	−9	20
10	Cheltenham Town U18s	20	5	3	12	29	65	−36	18
11	Yeovil Town U18s	20	4	3	13	35	69	−34	15

Source: soccerway.com
(C) Champions

=== Merit League Stage ===
The teams in the Southeast and Southwest Divisions played another ten games to determine the champions of Merit League One and Merit League Two and for this season only Merit League 3 as all three leagues would only contain 7 teams. Due to Covid, the Three Merit Leagues were regionalized for this season only.

==== Merit League One ====
Pos	Team	Pld	W	D	L	GF	GA	GD	Pts
1	Plymouth Argyle U18s (C)	6	3	2	1	11	4	+7	11
2	Exeter City U18s	6	3	1	2	13	9	+4	10
3	Forest Green Rovers U18s	6	3	1	2	11	13	−2	10
4	Cheltenham Town U18s	6	2	2	2	8	8	0	8
5	Bristol Rovers U18s	6	2	1	3	6	8	−2	7
6	Yeovil Town U18s	6	1	3	2	10	14	−4	6
7	Newport County U18s	6	1	2	3	9	12	−3	5

Source: soccerway.com
(C) Champions

==== Merit League Two ====
Pos	Team	Pld	W	D	L	GF	GA	GD	Pts
1	Southend United U18s (C)	6	4	1	1	15	10	+5	13
2	Northampton Town U18s	6	3	1	2	20	14	+6	10
3	Luton Town U18s	6	3	0	3	11	14	−3	9
4	Cambridge United U18s	6	2	2	2	17	13	+4	8
5	Stevenage U18s	6	2	2	2	13	14	−1	8
6	Peterborough United U18s	6	2	0	4	9	9	0	6
7	Milton Keynes Dons U18s	6	1	2	3	8	19	−11	5

Source: soccerway.com
(C) Champions

==== Merit League Three ====
Pos	Team	Pld	W	D	L	GF	GA	GD	Pts
1	AFC Bournemouth U18s (C)	6	4	1	1	10	7	+3	13
2	Portsmouth U18s	6	4	0	2	20	8	+12	12
3	Oxford United U18s	6	2	2	2	14	12	+2	8
4	Swindon Town U18s	6	2	2	2	15	14	+1	8
5	Leyton Orient U18s	6	2	1	3	12	15	−3	7
6	AFC Wimbledon U18s	6	2	1	3	12	19	−7	7
7	Gillingham U18s	6	1	1	4	7	15	−8	4

Source: soccerway.com
(C) Champions

== See also ==
- 2020–21 in English football
