= 2003–04 Charlton Athletic F.C. season =

Charlton Athletic
2003–04 season
- Chairman: Martin Simons
- Manager: Alan Curbishley
- Stadium: The Valley
- FA Premier League: 7th
- FA Cup: Third round
- League Cup: Third round
- Top goalscorer: League: Jason Euell (10); All: Jason Euell (10)
- Highest home attendance: 26,768 (vs. Chelsea, 26 December)
- Lowest home attendance: 25,206 (vs. Birmingham City, 17 April)
- Average home league attendance: 26,293
Home colours	Away colours

During the 2003–04 English football season, Charlton Athletic competed in the FA Premier League. The club also competed in the FA Cup, and the League Cup.

== Season summary ==
For the third season running, a late slump in form ended Charlton Athletic's hopes of European qualification. In 2001–02, they had finished 14th after failing to win any of their final eight games. In 2002–03, they had finished 12th after winning only one of their final ten games. 2003–04, however, brought Charlton's best ever Premier League finish, as well as their highest top tier league finish since 1952–53 (when Charlton finished 5th), as they came seventh. The club were inside the Champions League places as late as mid-March, but the familiar end-of-season setback, winning only four of their last 16 games, caused them to slip out of contention.

At the end of the season, goalkeeper Dean Kiely was named the club's Player of the Year.

== Kit ==
Charlton's kit was manufactured by Joma and sponsored by sports apparel retailer all:sports.

== Final league table ==
Pos	Team	Pld	W	D	L	GF	GA	GD	Pts	Qualification or relegation
5	Newcastle United	38	13	17	8	52	40	+12	56	Qualification for the UEFA Cup first round
6	Aston Villa	38	15	11	12	48	44	+4	56	
7	Charlton Athletic	38	14	11	13	51	51	0	53	
8	Bolton Wanderers	38	14	11	13	48	56	−8	53	
9	Fulham	38	14	10	14	52	46	+6	52	

Source: Premier League
Rules for classification: 1) points; 2) goal difference; 3) number of goals scored.

== Players ==
=== First-team squad ===
Squad at end of season

Note: Flags indicate national team as defined under FIFA eligibility rules; some limited exceptions apply. Players may hold more than one non-FIFA nationality.

No.	Pos.	Nation	Player
1	GK	IRL	Dean Kiely (Note: Kiely was born in Salford, England, and represented them at U-15, U-16, and U-18 level, but also qualified to represent the Republic of Ireland internationally and made his international debut for the Republic of Ireland in November 1999.)
2	DF	BUL	Radostin Kishishev
3	DF	ENG	Chris Powell
4	MF	ENG	Graham Stuart
5	DF	ENG	Richard Rufus
6	DF	RSA	Mark Fish
8	MF	IRL	Matt Holland (Note: Holland was born in Bury, England, but qualified to represent the Republic of Ireland internationally through his grandmother and made his debut for Republic of Ireland in 1999.) (captain)
9	FW	ENG	Jason Euell (Note: Euell was born in Lambeth, England, and represented them at U-21 level, but also qualified to represent Jamaica internationally through his father and would make his international debut for Jamaica in November 2004.)
10	MF	DEN	Claus Jensen
11	FW	ITA	Paolo Di Canio
12	DF	ISL	Hermann Hreidarsson
13	GK	ENG	Paul Rachubka (Note: Rachubka was born in San Luis Obispo, California, United States, but was raised in England from the age of 7, and represented them at U-16, U-18, and U-20 level.)
14	MF	ENG	Jerome Thomas
15	DF	ENG	Gary Rowett
16	FW	JAM	Kevin Lisbie (Note: Lisbie was born in Hackney, England, but also qualified to represent Jamaica internationally and made his international debut for Jamaica in 2002.)
17	FW	RSA	Shaun Bartlett
18	DF	ENG	Paul Konchesky

No.	Pos.	Nation	Player
19	DF	ENG	Luke Young
21	FW	FIN	Jonatan Johansson
22	MF	JAM	Jamal Campbell-Ryce (Note: Campbell-Ryce was born in Lambeth, England, but also qualified to represent Jamaica internationally and would make his international debut for Jamaica in 2003.)
23	DF	ENG	Michael Turner
24	DF	ENG	Jonathan Fortune
25	GK	ENG	Simon Royce
26	MF	IRL	Adrian Deane (Note: Deane was born in London, England, but also qualified to represent the Republic of Ireland internationally and represented them at youth level.)
28	DF	ENG	Osei Sankofa
29	MF	IRL	Neil McCafferty (Note: McCafferty was born in Derry, Northern Ireland, but also qualified to represent the Republic of Ireland internationally and represented them at U16 and U-19 level.)
30	MF	ENG	Stacy Long
31	MF	ENG	Lloyd Sam (Note: Sam was born in Leeds, England, and represented them at U-20 level, but also qualified to represent Ghana internationally through his parents and would make his international debut for Ghana in October 2015.)
32	FW	IRL	Stephen Tucker
33	MF	ENG	Stephen Hughes
34	GK	POR	Sérgio Leite
35	FW	ENG	Carlton Cole (on loan from Chelsea)
36	DF	ENG	Chris Perry
37	FW	ENG	Alex Varney

=== Left club during season ===
Note: Flags indicate national team as defined under FIFA eligibility rules; some limited exceptions apply. Players may hold more than one non-FIFA nationality.

No.	Pos.	Nation	Player
7	MF	ENG	Scott Parker (to Chelsea)
14	DF	ENG	Chris Bart-Williams (Note: Bart-Williams was born in Freetown, Sierra Leone, but was raised in England and represented them at U-21 and B level.) (on loan to Ipswich Town)
18	DF	ENG	Paul Konchesky (on loan to Tottenham Hotspur)

No.	Pos.	Nation	Player
20	FW	SWE	Mathias Svensson (to Norwich City)
27	FW	ENG	Mark DeBolla (to Chesterfield)

=== Reserve squad ===
Note: Flags indicate national team as defined under FIFA eligibility rules; some limited exceptions apply. Players may hold more than one non-FIFA nationality.

No.	Pos.	Nation	Player
—	DF	ENG	Barry Fuller
—	DF	ENG	Adam Gross
—	DF	ENG	Sheku Kamara

No.	Pos.	Nation	Player
—	DF	ENG	Mark Ricketts
—	MF	ENG	Nathan Ashton
—	MF	ENG	Myles Weston

== Transfers ==
=== In ===
- (Republic of Ireland) Matt Holland – (England) Ipswich Town, 16 June, £1,050,000
- (England) Simon Royce – (England) Leicester City, 26 June, free
- (Italy) Paolo Di Canio – (England) West Ham United, 11 August, free
- (Portugal) Sérgio Leite – (Portugal) Boavista, 14 August, free
- (England) Stephen Hughes- (England) Watford, 14 August, free
- (England) Carlton Cole – (England) Chelsea, 20 August, season-long loan
- (England) Chris Perry – (England) Tottenham Hotspur, 28 November, £100,000
- (England) Jerome Thomas – (England) Arsenal, 2 February, £100,000

=== Out ===
- (Wales) John Robinson – (Wales) Cardiff City, 10 July, free
- (Sweden) Mathias Svensson – (England) Norwich City, 19 December, undisclosed
- (England) Scott Parker – (England) Chelsea, 30 January, £10,000,000
- (Morocco) Tahar El Khalej – retired
- (England) Ben Roberts – (England) Brighton & Hove Albion
- Transfers in: ▼£1,250,000
- Transfers out: ▲£10,000,000

=== Loan out ===
- (England) Chris Bart-Williams – (England) Ipswich Town, loan

== Statistics ==
=== Appearances and goals ===
No.	Pos	Nat	Player	Total		Premier League		FA Cup		League Cup	
No.	Pos	Nat	Player	Apps	Goals	Apps	Goals	Apps	Goals	Apps	Goals
Goalkeepers
1	GK	(Republic of Ireland) IRL	Dean Kiely	40	0	37	0	1	0	2	0
25	GK	(England) ENG	Simon Royce	1	0	1	0	0	0	0	0
Defenders
3	DF	(England) ENG	Chris Powell	17	0	11+5	0	0	0	1	0
6	DF	(South Africa) RSA	Mark Fish	25	0	23	0	0	0	2	0
12	DF	(Iceland) ISL	Hermann Hreidarsson	35	2	33	2	1	0	1	0
15	DF	(England) ENG	Gary Rowett	1	0	1	0	0	0	0	0
19	DF	(England) ENG	Luke Young	25	0	21+3	0	0	0	1	0
24	DF	(England) ENG	Jonathan Fortune	31	2	21+7	2	1	0	1+1	0
36	DF	(England) ENG	Chris Perry	31	1	25+4	1	1	0	1	0
Midfielders
2	MF	(Bulgaria) BUL	Radostin Kishishev	35	0	30+3	0	1	0	1	0
4	MF	(England) ENG	Graham Stuart	31	3	23+5	3	1	0	2	0
8	MF	(Republic of Ireland) IRL	Matt Holland	41	6	38	6	1	0	2	0
9	MF	(England) ENG	Jason Euell	34	10	24+7	10	0+1	0	1+1	0
10	MF	(Denmark) DEN	Claus Jensen	34	5	27+4	4	1	0	2	1
14	MF	(England) ENG	Jerome Thomas	1	0	0+1	0	0	0	0	0
18	MF	(England) ENG	Paul Konchesky	22	0	17+4	0	1	0	0	0
22	MF	(Jamaica) JAM	Jamal Campbell-Ryce	4	0	0+2	0	0	0	0+2	0
Forwards
11	FW	(Italy) ITA	Paolo Di Canio	33	5	23+8	4	0+1	0	1	1
16	FW	(Jamaica) JAM	Kevin Lisbie	10	5	5+4	4	0	0	1	1
17	FW	(South Africa) RSA	Shaun Bartlett	19	5	13+6	5	0	0	0	0
20	FW	(Sweden) SWE	Mathias Svensson	4	0	1+2	0	0	0	0+1	0
21	FW	(Finland) FIN	Jonatan Johansson	29	4	16+10	4	1	0	1+1	0
35	FW	(England) ENG	Carlton Cole	23	5	8+13	4	1	1	1	0
Players transferred out during the season
7	MF	(England) ENG	Scott Parker	22	2	20	2	0	0	2	0

Last updated: 15 May 2004
Source: Competitions

== Results ==
Results are courtesy of Statto.

=== Results per matchday ===
Matchday	1	2	3	4	5	6	7	8	9	10	11	12	13	14	15	16	17	18	19	20	21	22	23	24	25	26	27	28	29	30	31	32	33	34	35	36	37	38
Ground	H	A	H	A	H	A	H	A	A	H	A	H	A	H	A	A	H	H	A	A	H	A	H	A	H	H	A	H	A	H	H	A	H	A	A	H	A	H
Result	L	W	D	D	L	L	W	W	W	D	W	W	D	L	L	D	D	W	W	D	W	W	L	L	L	W	L	W	L	L	D	W	D	L	L	D	D	W
Position	18	8	8	11	12	14	12	9	7	9	7	4	4	5	6	7	7	5	4	4	4	4	4	5	6	6	6	4	6	8	9	7	7	7	8	9	8	7

Source: WorldFootball.com
A = Away; H = Home; W = Win; D = Draw; L = Loss

Premier League

17 August 2003 1	Charlton Athletic	0–3	Manchester City	Greenwich, London
14:00 BST	Fish (red card) 70'; Konchesky (yellow card); Euell (yellow card)	Report	Anelka 13' (pen.); Sibierski 23' (yellow card); Jihai 83'	Stadium: The Valley; Attendance: 25,780; Referee: Mike Dean

23 August 2003 2	Wolverhampton Wanderers	0–4	Charlton Athletic	Wolverhampton, West Midlands
15:00 BST	Ince (yellow card); Iversen (yellow card)	Report	Euell 5'; Jensen 15'; Bartlett 25', 33'; Parker (yellow card) (red card) 71'	Stadium: Molineux; Attendance: 27,327; Referee: Phil Dowd

26 August 2003 3	Charlton Athletic	2–2	Everton	Greenwich, London
20:00 BST	Euell 24' (pen.), 49' (pen.); Jensen (yellow card)	Report	Watson 26'; Rooney 72'; Unsworth (yellow card)	Stadium: The Valley; Attendance: 26,336; Referee: Steven Dunn

30 August 2003 4	Bolton Wanderers	0–0	Charlton Athletic	Bolton, Greater Manchester
15:00 BST	Davies (yellow card); Jääskeläinen (yellow card); Campo (yellow card); Okocha (yellow card)	Report	Hreiðarsson (yellow card); Fortune (yellow card)	Stadium: Reebok Stadium; Attendance: 23,098; Referee: Alan Wiley

13 September 2003 5	Charlton Athletic	0–2	Manchester United	Greenwich, London
15:00 BST	Euell (yellow card) (red card) 65'; Kishishev (yellow card)	Report	van Nistelrooy 62', 82'; Butt (yellow card); P. Neville (yellow card)	Stadium: The Valley; Attendance: 26,078; Referee: Mike Riley

20 September 2003 6	Aston Villa	2–1	Charlton Athletic	Birmingham
15:00 BST	Alpay 36'; Samuel 55'	Report	Lisbie 86'; Young (yellow card); Fortune (yellow card)	Stadium: Villa Park; Attendance: 31,410; Referee: Chris Foy

28 September 2003 7	Charlton Athletic	3–2	Liverpool	Greenwich, London
14:00 BST	Lisbie 31', 43', 83'; Young (yellow card); Kishishev (yellow card)	Report	Šmicer 15'; Owen 52'; Diouf (yellow card)	Stadium: The Valley; Attendance: 26,508; Referee: Rob Styles

4 October 2003 8	Portsmouth	1–2	Charlton Athletic	Portsmouth, Hampshire
15:00 BST	Sheringham 34' (yellow card); de Zeeuw (yellow card); Sherwood (yellow card)	Report	Fortune 77'; Bartlett 90' (yellow card); Perry (yellow card)	Stadium: Fratton Park; Attendance: 20,106; Referee: Graham Poll

20 October 2003 9	Blackburn Rovers	0–1	Charlton Athletic	Blackburn, Lancashire
20:00 BST	Emerton (yellow card); Thompson (yellow card); Cole (yellow card)	Report	Hreidarsson 33'	Stadium: Ewood Park; Attendance: 19,939; Referee: Graham Barber

26 October 2003 10	Charlton Athletic	1–1	Arsenal	Greenwich, London
14:00 GMT	Di Canio 28' (pen.)	Report	Henry 39'	Stadium: The Valley; Attendance: 26,660; Referee: Steve Dunn

3 November 2003 11	Birmingham City	1–2	Charlton Athletic	Birmingham
20:00 GMT	Dugarry 27'	Report	Holland 11', 59'	Stadium: St. Andrew's; Attendance: 27,225; Referee: Phil Dowd

8 November 2003 12	Charlton Athletic	3–1	Fulham	Greenwich, London
15:00 GMT	Stuart 10'; Johansson 69', 76'	Report	Davis 89'	Stadium: The Valley; Attendance: 26,344; Referee: Andy D'Urso

22 November 2003 13	Leicester City	1–1	Charlton Athletic	Leicester, Leicestershire
15:00 GMT	Ferdinand 39'	Report	Di Canio 84' (pen.)	Stadium: Walkers Stadium; Attendance: 30,242; Referee: Graham Barber

29 November 2003 14	Charlton Athletic	0–1	Leeds United	London
15:00 GMT		Report	Milner 9'	Stadium: The Valley; Attendance: 26,445; Referee: Mark Halsey

7 December 2003 15	Southampton	3–2	Charlton Athletic	Southampton, Hampshire
16:05 GMT		Report		Stadium: St Mary's Stadium

13 December 2003 16	Middlesbrough	0–0	Charlton Athletic	Middlesbrough, North Yorkshire
15:00 GMT		Report		Stadium: Riverside Stadium; Attendance: 26,721; Referee: Howard Webb

20 December 2003 17	Charlton Athletic	0–0	Newcastle United	Greenwich, London
15:00 GMT		Report		Stadium: The Valley; Attendance: 26,508; Referee: Steve Bennett

26 December 2003 18	Charlton Athletic	4–2	Chelsea	Greenwich, London
12:30 GMT	Hreidarsson 1'; Holland 35'; Johansson 48'; Euell 53'	Report	Terry 10'; Guðjohnsen 76'	Stadium: The Valley; Attendance: 26,768; Referee: Graham Poll

28 December 2003 19	Tottenham Hotspur	0–1	Charlton Athletic	Haringey, London
15:00 GMT		Report	Cole 69'	Stadium: White Hart Lane; Attendance: 34,534; Referee: Paul Durkin

7 January 2004 20	Manchester City	1–1	Charlton Athletic	Manchester
19:45 GMT	Fowler 39'	Report	Di Canio 84'	Stadium: City of Manchester Stadium; Attendance: 44,307; Referee: Peter Walton

10 January 2004 21	Charlton Athletic	2–0	Wolverhampton Wanderers	Greenwich, London
15:00 GMT	Euell 38', 79'	Report		Stadium: The Valley; Attendance: 26,148; Referee: Rob Styles

17 January 2004 22	Everton	0–1	Charlton Athletic	Liverpool, Merseyside
15:00 GMT		Report	Stuart 41'	Stadium: Goodison Park; Attendance: 36,322; Referee: Mike Riley

31 January 2004 23	Charlton Athletic	1–2	Bolton Wanderers	Greenwich, London
15:00 GMT	Johansson 12'	Report	Pedersen 1'; Nolan 78'	Stadium: The Valley; Attendance: 26,249; Referee: Andy D'Urso

8 February 2004 24	Chelsea	1–0	Charlton Athletic	Fulham, London
16:05 GMT	Hasselbaink 28' (pen.)	Report		Stadium: Stamford Bridge; Attendance: 41,255; Referee: Steve Bennett

11 February 2004 25	Charlton Athletic	2–4	Tottenham Hotspur	Greenwich, London
20:00 GMT	Stuart 51'; Perry 81'	Report	Davies 10'; Defoe 43'; King 46'; Jackson 85'	Stadium: The Valley; Attendance: 26,660; Referee: Graham Barber

21 February 2004 26	Charlton Athletic	3–2	Blackburn Rovers	Greenwich, London
15:00 GMT	Cole 10'; Euell 36'; Jensen 90'	Report	Cole 74'; Friedel 90'	Stadium: The Valley; Attendance: 26,332; Referee: Uriah Rennie

28 February 2004 27	Arsenal	2–1	Charlton Athletic	Highbury, London
15:00 GMT	Pires 2'; Henry 4'	Report	Jensen 59'	Stadium: Highbury; Attendance: 38,137; Referee: Graham Barber

13 March 2004 28	Charlton Athletic	1–0	Middlesbrough	Greenwich, London
15:00 GMT	Holland 25'	Report		Stadium: The Valley; Attendance: 26,270; Referee: Mike Dean

20 March 2004 29	Newcastle United	3–1	Charlton Athletic	Newcastle upon Tyne, Tyneside
15:00 GMT	Shearer 2', 77'; Jenas 35'	Report	Jensen 54'	Stadium: St James' Park; Attendance: 51,847; Referee: Mike Riley

27 March 2004 30	Charlton Athletic	1–2	Aston Villa	Greenwich, London
15:00 GMT	Cole 8'	Report	Vassell 24'; Samuel 55'	Stadium: The Valley; Attendance: 26,250; Referee: Barry Knight

9 April 2004 31	Charlton Athletic	1–1	Portsmouth	Greenwich, London
15:00 BST	Bartlett 8'	Report	Yakubu 24'	Stadium: The Valley; Attendance: 26,385; Referee: Andy D'Urso

12 April 2004 32	Liverpool	0–1	Charlton Athletic	Liverpool, Merseyside
15:00 BST	Gerrard (yellow card)	Report	Bartlett 63'	Stadium: Anfield; Attendance: 40,003; Referee: Phil Dowd

17 April 2004 33	Charlton Athletic	1–1	Birmingham City	Greenwich, London
15:00 BST	Holland 86'	Report	Morrison 84'	Stadium: The Valley; Attendance: 25,206; Referee: Chris Foy

20 April 2004 34	Manchester United	2–0	Charlton Athletic	Trafford, Greater Manchester
20:00 BST	Saha 28'; G. Neville 65'	Report		Stadium: Old Trafford; Attendance: 67,477

24 April 2004 35	Fulham	2–0	Charlton Athletic	White City, London
15:00 BST	Malbranque 18' (pen.); Davis 64'	Report		Stadium: Loftus Road; Attendance: 16,585; Referee: Matt Messias

1 May 2004 36	Charlton Athletic	2–2	Leicester	Greenwich, London
15:00 BST	Fortune 53'; Di Canio 76' (pen.)	Report	Bent 5'; Ferdinand 88'	Stadium: The Valley; Attendance: 26,034; Referee: Rob Styles

8 May 2004 37	Leeds United	3–3	Charlton Athletic	Leeds, West Yorkshire
15:00 BST	Kilgallon 29'; Pennant 41'; Smith 69' (pen.)	Report	Holland 11'; Euell 76' (pen.), 79'	Stadium: Elland Road; Attendance: 38,986; Referee: Mark Halsey

15 May 2004 38	Charlton Athletic	2–1	Southampton	Greenwich, London
15:00 BST	Euell 36'; Cole 53'	Report	Prutton 64'	Stadium: The Valley; Attendance: 26,614; Referee: Jeff Winter

=== FA Cup ===
3 January 2004 Third round	Gillingham	3–2	Charlton	Gillingham, Kent
15:00 GMT	Johnson 17'; Sidibé 19'; Smith 34'	Report	Cox 1' (o.g.); Cole 90'	Stadium: Priestfield Stadium; Attendance: 10,894; Referee: Jeff Winter

=== League Cup ===
23 September 2003 Second round	Charlton	4–4 (a.e.t.) (8–7 p)	Luton	Greenwich, London
	Parker 41'; Lisbie 58'; Di Canio 90'; Jensen 95'	Report	Foley 30'; Bayliss 32'; McSheffrey 76'; Coyne 110'	Stadium: The Valley; Referee: Paul Armstrong
	Penalties
	Penalty scored		(penalty missed) Coyne

29 October 2003 Third round	Everton	1–0	Charlton	Liverpool, Merseyside
	Linderoth	Report		Stadium: Goodison Park; Attendance: 24,863; Referee: Alan Wiley
