= 2020–21 Charlton Athletic F.C. season =

Charlton Athletic
2020–21 season
- Chairman: Thomas Sandgaard (from 25 September)
- Manager: Lee Bowyer (until 15 March 2021); Johnnie Jackson (caretaker) (from 15 March 2021 until 18 March 2021); Nigel Adkins (From 18 March 2021)
- Stadium: The Valley
- League One: 7th
- FA Cup: First round (vs. Plymouth Argyle)
- EFL Cup: Second round (vs. West Ham United)
- EFL Trophy: Group Stage
- Top goalscorer: League: Chuks Aneke (15); All: Chuks Aneke (16)
- Highest home attendance: 2,000 (vs. Milton Keynes Dons, 2 December 2020) & (vs. AFC Wimbledon, 12 December 2020)
- Lowest home attendance: 0 (vs. Multiple teams) (Note: Includes multiple matches held behind closed doors.)
- Average home league attendance: 217 (Note: Total average attendance includes the 1,000 fans who attended the match against Doncaster Rovers on 19 September 2020, the 2,000 fans who attended the match against Milton Keynes Dons on 2 December 2020 and the 2,000 fans who attended the match against AFC Wimbledon on 12 December 2020.)
Home colours	Away colours	Third colours

The 2020–21 Charlton Athletic season was the club's 115th season in their existence, having been founded in 1905, and was their first back in League One following relegation from the Championship. Along with competing in League One, the club also participated in the FA Cup, EFL Cup and the EFL Trophy. The season covered the period from 1 August 2020 to 30 June 2021.

== Kit ==
Sportswear manufacturers Hummel were Kit suppliers. with sponsorship of Home shirts being KW Holdings whilst the away and third shirt sponsor were the Vitech Services Ltd.

== Squad statistics ==
As of 9 May 2021

No.	Pos	Nat	Player	Total		League One		FA Cup		League Cup		EFL Trophy	
No.	Pos	Nat	Player	Apps	Goals	Apps	Goals	Apps	Goals	Apps	Goals	Apps	Goals
2	DF	(Wales) WAL	Chris Gunter	36	1	31+5	1	0+0	0	0+0	0	0+0	0
3	DF	(England) ENG	Ben Purrington	32	2	19+9	2	1+0	0	2+0	0	1+0	0
4	DF	(England) ENG	Deji Oshilaja	20	1	16+1	1	0+0	0	2+0	0	1+0	0
5	DF	(England) ENG	Akin Famewo (on loan from Norwich City)	22	0	20+2	0	0+0	0	0+0	0	0+0	0
6	DF	(England) ENG	Jason Pearce	27	0	24+2	0	0+0	0	0+0	0	1+0	0
7	MF	(Wales) WAL	Jonny Williams	21	2	7+11	2	1+0	0	1+0	0	1+0	0
7	MF	(England) ENG	Diallang Jaiyesimi	14	1	7+7	1	0+0	0	0+0	0	0+0	0
8	MF	(England) ENG	Jake Forster-Caskey	38	6	32+2	6	1+0	0	1+0	0	1+1	0
9	FW	(Zimbabwe) ZIM	Macauley Bonne	6	1	3+0	0	0+0	0	2+0	1	0+1	0
9	FW	(England) ENG	Jayden Stockley (on loan from Preston North End)	22	8	20+2	8	0+0	0	0+0	0	0+0	0
10	FW	(England) ENG	Chuks Aneke	41	16	11+27	15	1+0	0	0+2	1	0+0	0
11	MF	(England) ENG	Alex Gilbey	25	3	18+5	3	0+0	0	0+2	0	0+0	0
12	MF	(Scotland) SCO	Andrew Shinnie (on loan from Luton Town)	29	3	18+11	3	0+0	0	0+0	0	0+0	0
13	GK	(England) ENG	Ben Amos	48	0	46+0	0	0+0	0	2+0	0	0+0	0
14	FW	(Northern Ireland) NIR	Conor Washington	38	11	28+8	11	0+1	0	0+1	0	0+0	0
15	MF	(England) ENG	Darren Pratley	41	1	33+6	1	0+0	0	2+0	0	0+0	0
16	DF	(Wales) WAL	Adam Matthews	29	0	22+5	0	1+0	0	0+0	0	1+0	0
17	FW	(England) ENG	Omar Bogle	17	2	12+5	2	0+0	0	0+0	0	0+0	0
18	MF	(England) ENG	Alfie Doughty	10	1	7+0	1	0+0	0	2+0	0	0+1	0
18	MF	(England) ENG	Matt Smith (on loan from Arsenal)	8	0	3+5	0	0+0	0	0+0	0	0+0	0
19	MF	(England) ENG	Albie Morgan	33	2	14+14	1	1+0	0	0+1	0	3+0	1
20	MF	(Turkey) TUR	Erhun Oztumer	5	1	2+0	0	0+0	0	2+0	0	1+0	1
21	MF	(England) ENG	Marcus Maddison	10	2	4+4	1	1+0	0	0+0	0	1+0	1
22	DF	(Netherlands) NED	Ian Maatsen (on loan from Chelsea)	35	1	31+3	1	0+1	0	0+0	0	0+0	0
23	MF	(Wales) WAL	Dylan Levitt (on loan from Manchester United)	5	0	3+0	0	1+0	0	1+0	0	0+0	0
24	DF	(England) ENG	Ryan Inniss	14	1	12+1	1	1+0	0	0+0	0	0+0	0
25	FW	(England) ENG	Josh Davison	2	0	0+0	0	0+0	0	0+0	0	2+0	0
26	MF	(England) ENG	Ben Watson	30	1	24+5	1	0+0	0	0+0	0	1+0	0
27	FW	(Canada) CAN	Liam Millar (on loan from Liverpool)	27	2	23+4	2	0+0	0	0+0	0	0+0	0
28	FW	(Northern Ireland) NIR	Paul Smyth (on loan from Queens Park Rangers)	14	1	8+6	1	0+0	0	0+0	0	0+0	0
29	FW	(Denmark) DEN	Ronnie Schwartz	16	1	3+13	1	0+0	0	0+0	0	0+0	0
30	GK	(Australia) AUS	Ashley Maynard-Brewer	4	0	0+0	0	1+0	0	0+0	0	3+0	0
31	GK	(England) ENG	Nathan Harness	0	0	0+0	0	0+0	0	0+0	0	0+0	0
32	MF	(England) ENG	George Lapslie	6	0	1+1	0	0+0	0	2+0	0	2+0	0
33	MF	(England) ENG	Ben Dempsey	1	0	0+0	0	0+0	0	0+0	0	1+0	0
34	FW	(Algeria) ALG	Wassim Aouachria	1	1	0+0	0	0+0	0	0+0	0	1+0	1
35	MF	(England) ENG	James Vennings	6	0	1+0	0	0+1	0	1+0	0	3+0	0
36	MF	(England) ENG	Jay Mingi	2	1	0+0	0	0+0	0	0+0	0	1+1	1
37	MF	(England) ENG	Johl Powell	1	0	0+0	0	0+0	0	0+0	0	0+1	0
38	MF	(Guinea-Bissau) GBS	Junior Quitirna	1	0	0+0	0	0+0	0	0+0	0	0+1	0
39	DF	(England) ENG	Luca Vega	1	0	0+0	0	0+0	0	0+0	0	1+0	0
40	MF	(England) ENG	Brendan Wiredu	0	0	0+0	0	0+0	0	0+0	0	0+0	0
41	GK	(England) ENG	Joseph Osaghae	0	0	0+0	0	0+0	0	0+0	0	0+0	0
44	FW	(Lebanon) LBN	Hady Ghandour	1	0	0+0	0	0+0	0	0+0	0	1+0	0
45	DF	(England) ENG	Lucas Ness	1	0	0+0	0	0+0	0	0+0	0	0+1	0
48	DF	(England) ENG	Charlie Barker	9	1	3+0	0	1+0	0	2+0	1	3+0	0
49	DF	(England) ENG	Kasim Aidoo	1	0	0+0	0	0+0	0	0+0	0	1+0	0
50	MF	(England) ENG	Aaron Henry	3	0	0+0	0	0+0	0	0+0	0	2+1	0
52	FW	(Republic of Ireland) IRL	Dylan Gavin	1	0	0+0	0	0+0	0	0+0	0	0+1	0

=== Top scorers ===
As of 9 May 2021

Place	Position	Nation	Number	Name	League One	FA Cup	League Cup	EFL Trophy	Total
1	FW	(England)	10	Chuks Aneke	15	0	1	0	16
2	FW	(Northern Ireland)	14	Conor Washington	11	0	0	0	11
3	FW	(England)	9	Jayden Stockley	8	0	0	0	8
4	MF	(England)	8	Jake Forster-Caskey	6	0	0	0	6
5	MF	(Scotland)	12	Andrew Shinnie	3	0	0	0	3
=	MF	(England)	11	Alex Gilbey	3	0	0	0	3
7	MF	(Wales)	7	Jonny Williams	2	0	0	0	2
=	DF	(England)	3	Ben Purrington	2	0	0	0	2
=	FW	(England)	17	Omar Bogle	2	0	0	0	2
=	FW	(Canada)	27	Liam Millar	2	0	0	0	2
=	MF	(England)	19	Albie Morgan	1	0	0	1	2
=	MF	(England)	21	Marcus Maddison	1	0	0	1	2
13	MF	(England)	18	Alfie Doughty	1	0	0	0	1
=	MF	(England)	15	Darren Pratley	1	0	0	0	1
=	FW	(Northern Ireland)	28	Paul Smyth	1	0	0	0	1
=	MF	(England)	26	Ben Watson	1	0	0	0	1
=	DF	(Wales)	2	Chris Gunter	1	0	0	0	1
=	FW	(Denmark)	29	Ronnie Schwartz	1	0	0	0	1
=	DF	(England)	4	Deji Oshilaja	1	0	0	0	1
=	MF	(England)	7	Diallang Jaiyesimi	1	0	0	0	1
=	DF	(Netherlands)	22	Ian Maatsen	1	0	0	0	1
=	DF	(England)	24	Ryan Inniss	1	0	0	0	1
=	FW	(Zimbabwe)	9	Macauley Bonne	0	0	1	0	1
=	DF	(England)	48	Charlie Barker	0	0	1	0	1
=	MF	(Turkey)	20	Erhun Oztumer	0	0	0	1	1
=	FW	(Algeria)	34	Wassim Aouachria	0	0	0	1	1
=	MF	(England)	36	Jay Mingi	0	0	0	1	1
Own goals					4	0	0	0	4
Totals					70	0	3	5	78

=== Disciplinary record ===
As of 9 May 2021

Number	Nation	Position	Name	League One		FA Cup		League Cup		EFL Trophy		Total	
Number	Nation	Position	Name	Yellow card	Red card	Yellow card	Red card	Yellow card	Red card	Yellow card	Red card	Yellow card	Red card
10	(England)	FW	Chuks Aneke	10	2	1	0	0	0	0	0	11	2
26	(England)	MF	Ben Watson	10	0	0	0	0	0	1	0	11	0
22	(Netherlands)	DF	Ian Maatsen	9	0	0	0	0	0	0	0	9	0
11	(England)	MF	Alex Gilbey	9	0	0	0	0	0	0	0	9	0
15	(England)	MF	Darren Pratley	8	2	0	0	0	0	0	0	8	2
19	(England)	MF	Albie Morgan	6	1	0	0	0	0	2	0	8	1
8	(England)	MF	Jake Forster-Caskey	6	0	1	0	0	0	0	0	7	0
4	(England)	DF	Deji Oshilaja	6	0	0	0	0	0	0	0	6	0
6	(England)	DF	Jason Pearce	4	1	0	0	0	0	0	0	4	1
3	(England)	DF	Ben Purrington	4	1	0	0	0	0	0	0	4	1
2	(Wales)	DF	Chris Gunter	4	0	0	0	0	0	0	0	4	0
24	(England)	DF	Ryan Inniss	3	1	0	0	0	0	0	0	3	1
1	(England)	GK	Ben Amos	3	0	0	0	0	0	0	0	3	0
27	(Canada)	FW	Liam Millar	3	0	0	0	0	0	0	0	3	0
21	(England)	MF	Marcus Maddison	2	0	0	0	0	0	0	0	2	0
28	(Northern Ireland)	FW	Paul Smyth	2	0	0	0	0	0	0	0	2	0
12	(Scotland)	MF	Andrew Shinnie	2	0	0	0	0	0	0	0	2	0
9	(England)	FW	Jayden Stockley	2	0	0	0	0	0	0	0	2	0
23	(Wales)	MF	Dylan Levitt	1	0	1	0	0	0	0	0	2	0
48	(England)	DF	Charlie Barker	1	0	0	0	0	0	1	0	2	0
18	(England)	MF	Alfie Doughty	1	0	0	0	0	0	0	0	1	0
5	(England)	DF	Akin Famewo	1	0	0	0	0	0	0	0	1	0
7	(England)	MF	Diallang Jaiyesimi	1	0	0	0	0	0	0	0	1	0
20	(Turkey)	MF	Erhun Oztumer	0	0	0	0	1	0	0	0	1	0
49	(England)	DF	Kasim Aidoo	0	0	0	0	0	0	1	0	1	0
34	(Algeria)	FW	Wassim Aouachria	0	0	0	0	0	0	1	0	1	0
Totals				98	8	3	0	1	0	6	0	108	8

== Transfers ==
=== Transfers in ===
Date from	Position	Nationality	Name	From	Fee	Ref.
12 August 2020	CM	(England)	Alex Gilbey	(England) Milton Keynes Dons	Undisclosed	
13 August 2020	CF	(Northern Ireland)	Conor Washington	(Scotland) Heart of Midlothian	Undisclosed	
14 August 2020	FW	(Lebanon)	Hady Ghandour	(England) Tooting & Mitcham United	Free transfer	
14 August 2020	DF	(England)	Lucas Ness	(England) Metropolitan Police	Free transfer	
25 September 2020	CM	(England)	Ben Watson	(England) Nottingham Forest	Free transfer	
1 October 2020	AM	(England)	Marcus Maddison	(England) Peterborough United	Free transfer	
8 October 2020	RB	(Wales)	Chris Gunter	(England) Reading	Free transfer	
9 October 2020	CF	(England)	Omar Bogle	(Wales) Cardiff City	Free transfer	
13 October 2020	CB	(England)	Ryan Inniss	(England) Crystal Palace	Undisclosed	
26 October 2020	RB	(Wales)	Adam Matthews	Free agent	Free transfer	
4 January 2021	CF	(Denmark)	Ronnie Schwartz	(Denmark) Midtjylland	Undisclosed	
1 February 2021	RW	(England)	Diallang Jaiyesimi	(England) Swindon Town	Undisclosed	
19 February 2021	CM	(Scotland)	Andrew Shinnie	(England) Luton Town	Undisclosed	

=== Transfers out ===
Date from	Position	Nationality	Name	To	Fee	Ref.
14 August 2020	CF	(Israel)	Tomer Hemed	(New Zealand) Wellington Phoenix	Released	
14 August 2020	LB	(England)	Lewis Page	(England) Exeter City	Released	
14 August 2020	DF	(France)	Naby Sarr	(England) Huddersfield Town	Released	
1 September 2020	CB	(Wales)	Tom Lockyer	(England) Luton Town	Free Transfer	
2 October 2020	CF	(Zimbabwe)	Macauley Bonne	(England) Queens Park Rangers	Undisclosed	
16 October 2020	GK	(England)	Dillon Phillips	(Wales) Cardiff City	Undisclosed	
19 January 2021	CM	(England)	George Lapslie	(England) Mansfield Town	Undisclosed	
22 January 2021	MF	(England)	Alfie Doughty	(England) Stoke City	Undisclosed	
29 January 2021	CF	(England)	Omar Bogle	(England) Doncaster Rovers	Undisclosed	
1 February 2021	MF	(England)	Brendan Wiredu	(England) Colchester United	Undisclosed	
1 February 2021	AM	(Wales)	Jonny Williams	(Wales) Cardiff City	Undisclosed	

=== Loans in ===
Date from	Position	Nationality	Name	From	Date until	Ref.
8 September 2020	CM	(Wales)	Dylan Levitt	(England) Manchester United	8 January 2021	
26 September 2020	CB	(England)	Akin Famewo	(England) Norwich City	End of season	
13 October 2020	LB	(Netherlands)	Ian Maatsen	(England) Chelsea	End of season	
16 October 2020	CM	(Scotland)	Andrew Shinnie	(England) Luton Town	19 February 2021	
16 October 2020	CF	(Northern Ireland)	Paul Smyth	(England) Queens Park Rangers	28 January 2021	
5 January 2021	CF	(Canada)	Liam Millar	(England) Liverpool	End of season	
22 January 2021	CF	(England)	Jayden Stockley	(England) Preston North End	End of season	
1 February 2021	CM	(England)	Matt Smith	(England) Arsenal	End of season	

=== Loans out ===
Date from	Position	Nationality	Name	To	Date until	Ref.
12 October 2020	MF	(England)	Ben Dempsey	(England) Woking	End of season	
15 October 2020	CM	(England)	George Lapslie	(England) Mansfield Town	19 January 2021	
15 October 2020	AM	(Turkey)	Erhun Oztumer	(England) Bristol Rovers	End of season	
24 October 2020	CF	(England)	Josh Davison	(England) Woking	13 January 2021	
24 October 2020	MF	(England)	Charles Clayden	(England) Dulwich Hamlet	24 November 2020	
8 December 2020	GK	(England)	Nathan Harness	(England) Welling United	3 January 2021	
19 January 2021	CF	(England)	Josh Davison	(England) Forest Green Rovers	End of season	
1 February 2021	AM	(England)	Marcus Maddison	(England) Bolton Wanderers	12 April 2021	

== Friendlies ==
22 August 2020 Friendly	Birmingham City	1–1	Charlton Athletic	Birmingham
12:00 BST	Boyd-Munce 45'	Report	Doughty 22'	Stadium: Birmingham City Training Ground; Attendance: 0

25 August 2020 Friendly	Charlton Athletic	2–3	Southend United	New Eltham
13:00 BST	Davison 17' (pen.); Lapslie 45'	Report	Goodship 71'; Kinali 72'; Hutchinson 89'	Stadium: Charlton Athletic Training Ground; Attendance: 0

29 August 2020 Friendly	Crystal Palace	3–0	Charlton Athletic	Selhurst
14:10 BST	Ayew 63', 66'; Zaha 88'	Report		Stadium: Selhurst Park; Attendance: 0

== Competitions ==
=== League One ===
==== League table ====
Pos	Team	Pld	W	D	L	GF	GA	GD	Pts	Promotion, qualification or relegation
3	Blackpool (O, P)	46	23	11	12	60	37	+23	80	Qualification for League One play-offs
4	Sunderland	46	20	17	9	70	42	+28	77	Qualification for League One play-offs
5	Lincoln City	46	22	11	13	69	50	+19	77	Qualification for League One play-offs
6	Oxford United	46	22	8	16	77	56	+21	74	Qualification for League One play-offs
7	Charlton Athletic	46	20	14	12	70	56	+14	74	
8	Portsmouth	46	21	9	16	65	51	+14	72	
9	Ipswich Town	46	19	12	15	46	46	0	69	
10	Gillingham	46	19	10	17	63	60	+3	67	
11	Accrington Stanley	46	18	13	15	63	68	−5	67	

Source: EFL Official Website
Rules for classification: 1) Points; 2) Goal difference; 3) Number of goals scored; 4) Head-to-head results; 5) Wins; 6) Away goals; 7) Penalty points (sec 9.5); 8) 12-point sending off offences
(O) Play-off winners; (P) Promoted

==== Result summary ====
Overall								Home						Away					
Pld	W	D	L	GF	GA	GD	Pts	W	D	L	GF	GA	GD	W	D	L	GF	GA	GD
46	20	14	12	70	56	+14	74	8	7	8	36	37	−1	12	7	4	34	19	+15

Last updated: 9 May 2021.

==== Results by round ====
Round	1	2	3	4	5	6	7	8	9	10	11	12	13	14	15	16	17	18	19	20	21	22	23	24	25	26	27	28	29	30	31	32	33	34	35	36	37	38	39	40	41	42	43	44	45	46
Ground	A	H	A	H	H	A	A	H	A	H	A	A	A	H	A	H	A	H	A	H	H	A	A	H	A	H	A	H	A	H	H	A	A	H	H	H	A	A	A	H	A	H	H	A	H	H
Result	W	L	L	D	W	W	W	W	W	W	D	L	W	L	D	W	D	D	L	L	D	W	L	D	W	L	W	L	D	L	L	W	D	W	D	W	D	W	W	D	W	L	D	D	W	W
Position	3	11	18	14	15	11	8	6	5	3	5	6	3	4	6	5	7	6	6	7	7	6	6	6	6	8	6	9	9	9	12	9	9	8	8	6	10	7	8	8	6	8	8	8	8	7

Updated to match(es) played on 9 May 2021. Source:
A = Away; H = Home; W = Win; D = Draw; L = Loss

==== Matches ====
The 2020–21 season fixtures were released on Friday 21 August 2020.

12 September 2020 1	Crewe Alexandra	0–2	Charlton Athletic	Crewe
15:00 BST		Report	Doughty 24'; Washington 43'	Stadium: Alexandra Stadium; Attendance: 0 Referee: Graham Salisbury

19 September 2020 2	Charlton Athletic	1–3	Doncaster Rovers	Charlton
15:00 BST	Washington 67'	Report	Gomes 25'; Barker 49' (o.g.); John-Jules 63'	Stadium: The Valley; Attendance: 1,000; Referee: John Busby

27 September 2020 3	Lincoln City	2–0	Charlton Athletic	Lincoln
15:00 BST	Grant 45+1'; Montsma 88'	Report		Stadium: LNER Stadium; Attendance: 0 Referee: Marc Edwards

3 October 2020 4	Charlton Athletic	0–0	Sunderland	Charlton
15:00 BST		Report		Stadium: The Valley; Attendance: 0 Referee: Andy Davies

17 October 2020 5	Charlton Athletic	1–0	Wigan Athletic	Charlton
15:00 BST	Forster-Caskey 65'	Report		Stadium: The Valley; Attendance: 0 Referee: Ollie Yates

20 October 2020 6	Blackpool	0–1	Charlton Athletic	Blackpool
19:00 BST		Report	Aneke 83'	Stadium: Bloomfield Road; Attendance: 0 Referee: James Bell

24 October 2020 7	Northampton Town	0–2	Charlton Athletic	Northampton
15:00 BST		Report	Pratley 54'; Sowerby 59' (o.g.)	Stadium: PTS Academy Stadium; Attendance: 0 Referee: Sam Allison

27 October 2020 8	Charlton Athletic	2–0	Oxford United	Charlton
19:00 GMT	Washington 32'; Shinnie 45+1'	Report		Stadium: The Valley; Attendance: 0 Referee: Craig Hicks

31 October 2020 9	Portsmouth	0–2	Charlton Athletic	Portsmouth
15:00 GMT		Report	Williams 26'; Aneke 82'	Stadium: Fratton Park; Attendance: 0 Referee: Carl Boyeson

3 November 2020 10	Charlton Athletic	3–2	Fleetwood Town	Charlton
19:00 GMT	Purrington 4'; Washington 31', 50' (pen.)	Report	Evans 33', 34'	Stadium: The Valley; Attendance: 0 Referee: Christopher Pollard

21 November 2020 11	Gillingham	1–1	Charlton Athletic	Gillingham
13:00 GMT	Graham 73' (pen.)	Report	Aneke 82'	Stadium: Priestfield Stadium; Attendance: 0 Referee: Robert Lewis

24 November 2020 12	Burton Albion	4–2	Charlton Athletic	Burton upon Trent
19:00 GMT	Akins 9'; Powell 39'; Hughes 53'; Vernam 76'	Report	Smyth 42'; Aneke 67'	Stadium: Pirelli Stadium; Attendance: 0 Referee: Ollie Yates

28 November 2020 13	Ipswich Town	0–2	Charlton Athletic	Ipswich
15:00 GMT		Report	Morgan 21'; Bogle 68'	Stadium: Portman Road; Attendance: 0 Referee: Craig Hicks

2 December 2020 14	Charlton Athletic	0–1	Milton Keynes Dons	Charlton
19:45 GMT		Report	Fraser 75'	Stadium: The Valley; Attendance: 2,000; Referee: Andy Davies

5 December 2020 15	Shrewsbury Town	1–1	Charlton Athletic	Shrewsbury
15:00 GMT	Norburn 90+5' (pen.)	Report	Watson 71'	Stadium: Montgomery Waters Meadow; Attendance: 2,000; Referee: Anthony Backhouse

12 December 2020 16	Charlton Athletic	5–2	AFC Wimbledon	Charlton
15:00 GMT	Washington 37'; Forster-Caskey 64'; Williams 65'; Aneke 85'; Purrington 90+2'	Report	Pigott 42'; Csóka 45'	Stadium: The Valley; Attendance: 2,000; Referee: David Rock

19 December 2020 17	Swindon Town	2–2	Charlton Athletic	Swindon
15:00 GMT	Jaiyesimi 26'; Pitman 90'	Report	Bogle 37'; Aneke 61'	Stadium: County Ground; Attendance: 2,000; Referee: Benjamin Speedie

26 December 2020 18	Charlton Athletic	2–2	Plymouth Argyle	Charlton
15:00 GMT	Gunter 32'; Maddison 67'	Report	Jephcott 6', 36'	Stadium: The Valley; Attendance: 0 Referee: Andy Woolmer

2 January 2021 19	Hull City	2–0	Charlton Athletic	Kingston upon Hull
15:00 GMT	Adelakun 18'; Docherty 76'	Report		Stadium: KCOM Stadium; Attendance: 0 Referee: Martin Coy

8 January 2021 20	Charlton Athletic	0–2	Accrington Stanley	Charlton
19:45 GMT		Report	Bishop 36', 67'	Stadium: The Valley; Attendance: 0 Referee: Sam Purkiss

12 January 2021 21	Charlton Athletic	4–4	Rochdale	Charlton
19:00 GMT	Aneke 23', 65'; Forster-Caskey 37'; Schwartz 67'	Report	Lund 12'; Baah 21', 31'; Humphrys 42'	Stadium: The Valley; Attendance: 0 Referee: Trevor Kettle

16 January 2021 22	Bristol Rovers	0–1	Charlton Athletic	Bristol
15:00 GMT		Report	Forster-Caskey 64'	Stadium: Memorial Stadium; Attendance: 0 Referee: Peter Wright

19 January 2021 23	Peterborough United	2–1	Charlton Athletic	Peterborough
18:30 GMT	Szmodics 66', 79'	Report	Washington 14' (pen.)	Stadium: Weston Homes Stadium; Attendance: 0 Referee: Sam Purkiss

23 January 2021 24	Charlton Athletic	2–2	Swindon Town	Charlton
15:00 GMT	Aneke 57'; Shinnie 90'	Report	Hope 5'; Palmer 39'	Stadium: The Valley; Attendance: 0 Referee: James Linington

26 January 2021 25	Milton Keynes Dons	0–1	Charlton Athletic	Milton Keynes
19:00 GMT		Report	Millar 18'	Stadium: Stadium MK; Attendance: 0 Referee: Dean Whitestone

2 February 2021 26	Charlton Athletic	1–3	Portsmouth	Charlton
19:00 GMT	Stockley 52'	Report	Jacobs 39'; Naylor 55'; Cannon 61'	Stadium: The Valley; Attendance: 0 Referee: Lee Swabey

6 February 2021 27	Rochdale	0–2	Charlton Athletic	Rochdale
15:00 GMT		Report	Aneke 7'; Oshilaja 27'	Stadium: Crown Oil Arena; Attendance: 0 Referee: Thomas Bramall

13 February 2021 28	Charlton Athletic	2–3	Gillingham	Charlton
15:00 GMT	Aneke 15'; Stockley 52'	Report	Lee 1'; Ogilvie 37'; Dempsey 86'	Stadium: The Valley; Attendance: 0 Referee: Kevin Johnson

20 February 2021 29	Fleetwood Town	1–1	Charlton Athletic	Fleetwood
15:00 GMT	Madden 41'	Report	Stockley 6'	Stadium: Highbury Stadium; Attendance: 0 Referee: Carl Boyeson

23 February 2021 30	Charlton Athletic	1–2	Burton Albion	Charlton
19:00 GMT	Stockley 9'	Report	Fondop 25'; Watson 54' (o.g.)	Stadium: The Valley; Attendance: 0 Referee: Christopher Pollard

27 February 2021 31	Charlton Athletic	0–3	Blackpool	Charlton
15:00 GMT		Report	Yates 10' (pen.), 52' (pen.); Virtue 37'	Stadium: The Valley; Attendance: 0 Referee: Brett Huxtable

2 March 2021 32	Wigan Athletic	0–1	Charlton Athletic	Wigan
18:00 GMT		Report	Aneke 19'	Stadium: DW Stadium; Attendance: 0 Referee: Sam Allison

6 March 2021 33	Oxford United	0–0	Charlton Athletic	Oxford
15:00 GMT		Report		Stadium: Kassam Stadium; Attendance: 0 Referee: Tom Nield

9 March 2021 34	Charlton Athletic	2–1	Northampton Town	Charlton
19:00 GMT	Washington 65' (pen.), 84'	Report	Jones 90+3'	Stadium: The Valley; Attendance: 0 Referee: Paul Howard

13 March 2021 35	Charlton Athletic	1–1	Shrewsbury Town	Charlton
15:00 GMT	Washington 78'	Report	Goss 56'	Stadium: The Valley; Attendance: 0 Referee: Declan Bourne

16 March 2021 36	Charlton Athletic	3–2	Bristol Rovers	Charlton
19:00 GMT	Shinnie 33'; Forster-Caskey 42'; Washington 84'	Report	Leahy 18' (pen.); Upson 32'	Stadium: The Valley; Attendance: 0 Referee: Bobby Madley

20 March 2021 37	AFC Wimbledon	2–2	Charlton Athletic	Wimbledon
15:00 GMT	Longman 15', 65'	Report	Stockley 10'; Jaiyesimi 21'	Stadium: Plough Lane; Attendance: 0 Referee: Charles Breakspear

2 April 2021 38	Doncaster Rovers	0–1	Charlton Athletic	Doncaster
12:30 BST		Report	Maatsen 12'	Stadium: Keepmoat Stadium; Attendance: 0 Referee: Marc Edwards

10 April 2021 39	Sunderland	1–2	Charlton Athletic	Sunderland
15:00 BST	Scowen 77'	Report	Scowen 31' (o.g.); Gilbey 61'	Stadium: Stadium of Light; Attendance: 0 Referee: Anthony Backhouse

17 April 2021 40	Charlton Athletic	0–0	Ipswich Town	Charlton
12:30 BST		Report		Stadium: The Valley; Attendance: 0 Referee: Craig Hicks

20 April 2021 41	Plymouth Argyle	0–6	Charlton Athletic	Plymouth
19:45 BST		Report	Forster-Caskey 26'; Stockley 45'; Watts 47' (o.g.); Gilbey 49'; Millar 56'; Aneke 89'	Stadium: Home Park; Attendance: 0 Referee: Sam Purkiss

24 April 2021 42	Charlton Athletic	0–1	Peterborough United	Charlton
15:00 BST		Report	Clarke-Harris 9'	Stadium: The Valley; Attendance: 0 Referee: Keith Stroud

27 April 2021 43	Charlton Athletic	2–2	Crewe Alexandra	Charlton
19:00 BST	Stockley 10'; Gilbey 83'	Report	Dale 67', 90+6'	Stadium: The Valley; Attendance: 0 Referee: Trevor Kettle

1 May 2021 44	Accrington Stanley	1–1	Charlton Athletic	Accrington
15:00 BST	Pritchard 81'	Report	Aneke 90+5'	Stadium: Wham Stadium; Attendance: 0 Referee: Alan Young

4 May 2021 45	Charlton Athletic	3–1	Lincoln City	Charlton
19:00 BST	Stockley 47'; Inniss 65'; Aneke 66'	Report	Anderson 88'	Stadium: The Valley; Attendance: 0 Referee: Kevin Johnson

9 May 2021 46	Charlton Athletic	1–0	Hull City	Charlton
12:00 BST	Greaves 75' (o.g.)	Report		Stadium: The Valley; Attendance: 0 Referee: Martin Coy

=== FA Cup ===
The draw for the first round was made on Monday 26, October.

7 November 2020 First round	Charlton Athletic	0–1	Plymouth Argyle	Charlton
15:00 GMT		Report	Jephcott 60'	Stadium: The Valley; Attendance: 0 Referee: Neil Hair

=== EFL Cup ===
The first round draw was made on 18 August, live on Sky Sports, by Paul Merson. The draw for both the second and third round were confirmed on September 6, live on Sky Sports by Phil Babb.

5 September 2020 First round	Swindon Town	1–3	Charlton Athletic	Swindon
15:00 BST	Smith 64'	Report	Bonne 36'; Barker 74'; Aneke 90'	Stadium: The Energy Check County Ground; Attendance: 0 Referee: Brett Hextable

15 September 2020 Second round	West Ham United	3–0	Charlton Athletic	Stratford
19:30 BST	Haller 22', 26'; Anderson 80'	Report		Stadium: London Stadium; Attendance: 0 Referee: Andre Marriner

=== EFL Trophy ===
The regional group stage draw was confirmed on 18 August.

Pos	Div	Team	Pld	W	PW	PL	L	GF	GA	GD	Pts	Qualification
1	L2	Leyton Orient	3	2	0	0	1	6	5	+1	6	Advance to Round 2
2	L1	AFC Wimbledon	3	2	0	0	1	4	3	+1	6	Advance to Round 2
3	L1	Charlton Athletic	3	1	1	0	1	5	4	+1	5	
4	ACA	Brighton & Hove Albion U21	3	0	0	1	2	3	6	−3	1	

Source: EFL.com

1 September 2020 Group stage 1	AFC Wimbledon	2–1	Charlton Athletic	White City
17:30 BST	Roscrow 46'; Thomas 58'	Report	Oztumer 22'	Stadium: Loftus Road; Attendance: 0 Referee: Carl Brook

30 September 2020 Group stage 2	Charlton Athletic	1–1 (4–1 p)	Brighton & Hove Albion U21	Charlton
19:00 BST	Morgan 48'	Report	Lapslie 30' (o.g.)	Stadium: The Valley; Attendance: 0 Referee: Lee Swabey
	Penalties
	Vennings (penalty scored); Morgan (penalty scored); Henry (penalty scored); Davison (penalty scored)		Spong (penalty missed); Yapi (penalty scored); Vukoje (penalty missed)

10 November 2020 Group stage 3	Charlton Athletic	3–1	Leyton Orient	Charlton
19:00 GMT	Aouachria 12'; Mingi 64'; Maddison 74'	Report	Dennis 67'	Stadium: The Valley; Attendance: 0 Referee: Charles Breakspear
