= 2004–05 FA Premier Reserve League =

English football league season

The 2004–05 FA Premier Reserve League season was the sixth since its establishment and featured 15 teams in the Northern League - won by Manchester United Reserves - and 15 teams in the Southern League - won by Charlton Athletic Reserves.

== League table ==
Reserve League North

Pos	Club	Pld	W	D	L	F	A	GD	Pts
1	Manchester United Reserves	28	19	6	3	68	23	+45	63
2	Aston Villa Reserves	28	16	6	6	62	38	+24	54
3	Manchester City Reserves	28	16	6	6	55	32	+23	54
4	Blackburn Rovers Reserves	28	11	12	5	45	28	+17	45
5	Birmingham City Reserves	28	12	7	9	37	36	+1	43
6	Wolverhampton Wanderers Reserves	28	9	9	10	32	32	0	36
7	Middlesbrough Reserves	28	10	6	12	41	42	-1	36
8	Everton Reserves	28	8	11	9	23	34	-11	35
9	Sunderland Reserves	28	8	9	11	38	44	-6	33
10	Bolton Wanderers Reserves	28	8	9	11	32	41	-9	33
11	West Bromwich Albion Reserves	28	6	13	9	29	36	-7	31
12	Newcastle United Reserves	28	8	7	13	30	41	-11	31
13	Leeds United Reserves	28	7	7	14	31	52	-21	28
14	Liverpool Reserves	28	6	8	14	27	47	-20	26
15	Nottingham Forest Reserves	28	5	6	17	21	45	-24	21

Reserve League South

Pos	Club	Pld	W	D	L	F	A	GD	Pts
1	Charlton Athletic Reserves	28	18	7	3	46	21	+25	61
2	Southampton Reserves	28	18	4	6	68	29	+39	58
3	Arsenal Reserves	28	17	5	6	65	38	+27	56
4	Crystal Palace Reserves	28	16	5	7	47	22	+25	53
5	Tottenham Hotspur Reserves	28	13	8	7	47	35	+12	47
6	Chelsea Reserves	28	10	8	10	28	28	0	38
7	Watford Reserves	28	9	9	10	32	33	-1	36
8	Norwich City Reserves	28	10	4	14	24	40	-16	34
9	Fulham Reserves	28	8	9	11	29	35	-6	33
10	Derby County Reserves	28	9	6	13	29	48	-19	33
11	West Ham United Reserves	28	7	9	12	33	51	-18	30
12	Coventry City Reserves	28	7	8	13	29	50	-21	29
13	Ipswich Town Reserves	28	6	6	16	24	35	-11	24
14	Leicester City Reserves	28	5	9	14	36	49	-13	24
15	Portsmouth Reserves	28	5	7	16	28	51	-23	22

Pld = Matches played; W = Matches won; D = Matches drawn; L = Matches lost; F = Goals for; A = Goals against; GD = Goal difference; Pts = Points

== North/South Play-off Shield ==
12 May 2005
19:30 BST

Charlton Athletic Reserves	2–4	Manchester United Reserves
Lloyd Sam 51'; James Walker 78'	Report	Giuseppe Rossi 14', 55', 72'; David Jones 50'

The Valley, Charlton
Attendance: 7,102

== See also ==
- 2004–05 in English football
- FA Premier League 2004–05
