= 2003–04 FA Premier Reserve League =

English football league season

The 2003–04 FA Premier Reserve League season was the fifth since its establishment and featured 14 teams in the Northern League - won by Aston Villa Reserves - and 15 teams in the Southern League - won by Charlton Athletic Reserves.

== League table ==
Reserve League North

Pos	Club	Pld	W	D	L	F	A	GD	Pts
1	Aston Villa Reserves	26	17	5	4	55	31	+24	56
2	Liverpool Reserves	26	14	8	4	41	21	+20	50
3	Manchester United Reserves	26	13	8	5	55	39	+16	47
4	Newcastle United Reserves	26	13	4	9	50	42	+8	43
5	Manchester City Reserves	26	11	8	7	34	24	+10	41
6	Blackburn Rovers Reserves	26	11	6	9	49	45	+4	39
7	Everton Reserves	26	10	8	8	37	33	+4	38
8	Leeds United Reserves	26	10	7	9	40	40	0	37
9	Middlesbrough Reserves	26	8	10	8	33	33	0	34
10	Sunderland Reserves	26	8	7	11	37	46	-9	31
11	West Bromwich Albion Reserves	26	8	6	12	36	48	-12	30
12	Birmingham City Reserves	26	6	5	15	28	42	-14	23
13	Wolverhampton Wanderers Reserves	26	4	6	16	27	49	-22	18
14	Bolton Wanderers Reserves	26	3	4	19	22	51	-29	13

Reserve League South

Pos	Club	Pld	W	D	L	F	A	GD	Pts
1	Charlton Athletic Reserves	28	17	6	5	46	19	+27	57
2	Derby County Reserves	28	13	10	5	46	31	+15	49
3	Southampton Reserves	28	14	6	8	43	28	+15	48
4	West Ham United Reserves	28	12	8	8	37	35	+2	44
5	Tottenham Hotspur Reserves	28	11	9	8	42	35	+7	42
6	Arsenal Reserves	28	10	9	9	41	35	+6	39
7	Chelsea Reserves	28	11	6	11	37	33	+4	39
8	Leicester City Reserves	28	9	11	8	34	40	-6	38
9	Coventry City Reserves	28	9	10	9	38	40	-2	37
10	Wimbledon Reserves	28	9	5	14	35	48	-13	32
11	Watford Reserves	28	6	12	10	32	40	-8	30
12	Nottingham Forest Reserves	28	6	11	11	33	41	-8	29
13	Portsmouth Reserves	28	6	11	11	36	46	-10	29
14	Ipswich Town Reserves	28	8	4	16	34	44	-10	28
15	Fulham Reserves	28	6	8	14	27	54	-27	26

Pld = Matches played; W = Matches won; D = Matches drawn; L = Matches lost; F = Goals for; A = Goals against; GD = Goal difference; Pts = Points

Best Player: Gary Bockhorni (Chelsea F.C)

Best Goalkeeper: Markus Thomson (Charlton Athletic F.C.)

== See also ==
- 2003–04 in English football
- FA Premier League 2003–04
