= Hady Ghandour =

Association football player (born 2000)

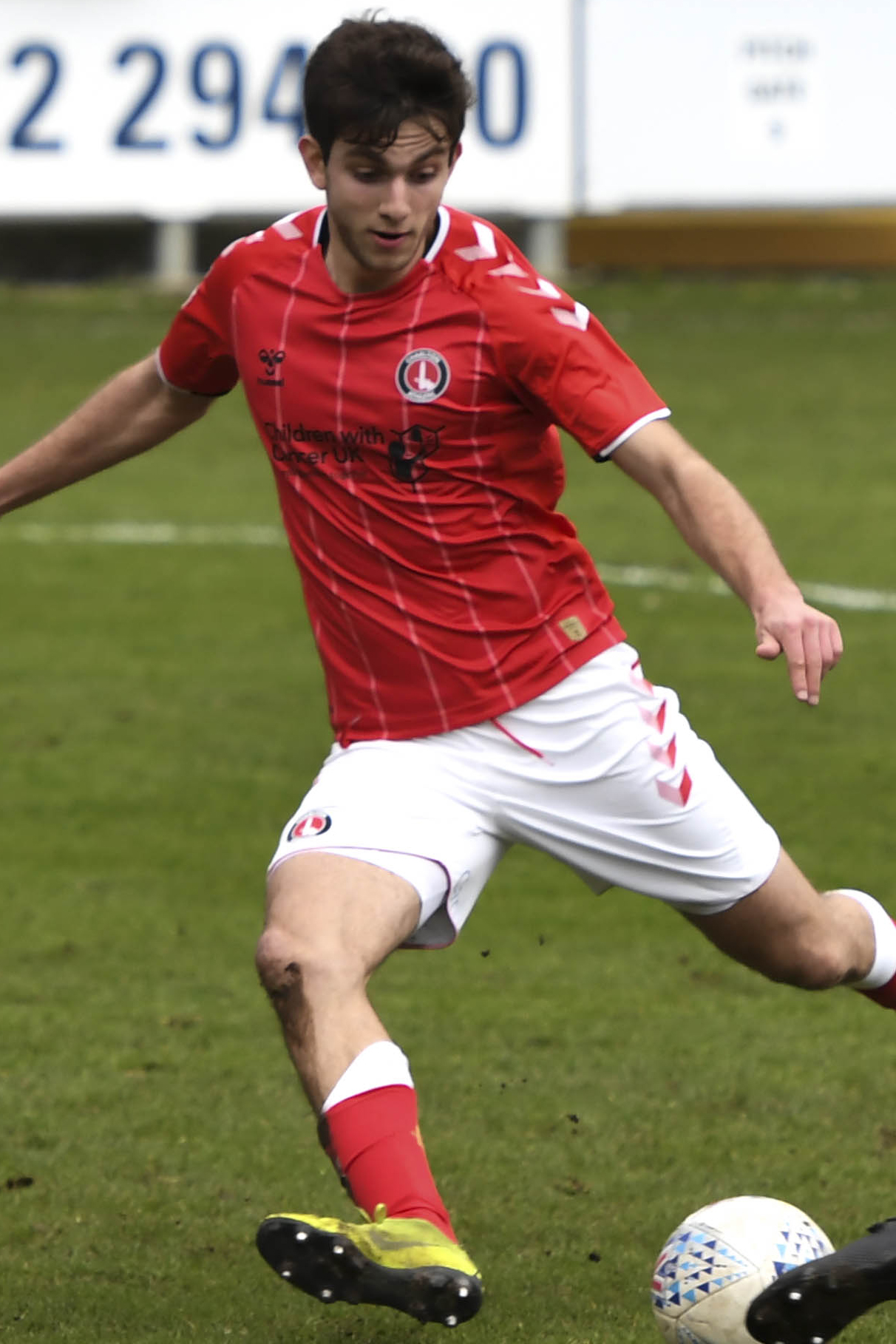
- Ghandour with Charlton Athletic in 2020

Personal information
- Full name: Hady Ismail Ghandour
- Date of birth: 27 January 2000 (age 26)
- Place of birth: Westminster, England
- Height: 1.89 m (6 ft 2 in)
- Position: Forward

Team information
- Current team: Eastleigh
- Number: 23

Youth career
- 2014–2016: Tripoli
- 2016–2019: Tooting & Mitcham United
- 2020–2022: Charlton Athletic

Senior career*
Years	Team	Apps	(Gls)
2018–2020	Tooting & Mitcham United	42	(13)
2020–2022	Charlton Athletic	0	(0)
2021	→ Maidstone United (loan)	5	(0)
2022	→ Chelmsford City (loan)	4	(0)
2022	→ Maidstone United (loan)	10	(2)
2022–2023	Maidstone United	10	(0)
2023–2026	Aldershot Town	58	(8)
2023–2024	→ Farnborough (loan)	9	(6)
2024–2025	→ Farnborough (loan)	1	(0)
2026–	Eastleigh	1	(0)

International career^{‡}
2015	Lebanon U16	4	(1)
2017	Lebanon U19	2	(0)
2021	Lebanon	1	(0)
- * Club domestic league appearances and goals as of 12 September 2026 ‡ National team caps and goals as of 13:46, 7 September 2021 (UTC)

Hady Ismail Ghandour (/ˈhædi ɡænˈdʊər/ HA-dee gan-DOOR; Arabic: هادي اسماعيل غندور, Lebanese Arabic pronunciation: ['heːdi ɣan'duːr]; born 27 January 2000) is a professional footballer who plays as a forward for National League club Eastleigh. Born in England, Ghandour has played for the Lebanon national team.

Coming through the youth system, Ghandour began his senior career at Tooting & Mitcham United in 2018. He moved to Charlton Athletic after two seasons at the club, and was sent on loans to Maidstone United and Chelmsford City. In 2022, Ghandour joined Maidstone United permanently, before joining Aldershot Town the following year.

Having represented Lebanon internationally at both youth and senior level, Ghandour made his senior debut in the qualifiers for the 2022 FIFA World Cup.

== Early life ==
Ghandour was born in Westminster, London, England on 27 January 2000, to Lebanese parents both from Tripoli, and was raised in Chelsea, London. Ghandour holds both English and Lebanese citizenship. His father, Ismail, had moved to the United Kingdom from Tripoli, Lebanon at age 13, to study at the Royal Russel School in Croydon, South London.

While living in England, Ghandour used to play for AC Tripoli's youth team in Lebanon during the Easter and summer vacations. Towards the end of his A-Levels, Ghandour trialed for Charlton Athletic; however, he decided to concentrate on his studies. He joined Tooting & Mitcham United in 2016, playing for the U18 and U23 teams.

== Club career ==
=== Tooting & Mitcham United ===
==== 2018–19: Debut season ====
Coming through the youth system, Ghandour made his senior debut for Isthmian League South Central Division side Tooting & Mitcham United on 9 October 2018, against Burgess Hill Town in the Velocity Trophy. His first league game came four days later against Cheshunt. One week later, on 20 October, Ghandour scored his first goal, helping his side beat Egham Town 4–3 away from home in the league. On 23 February 2019, he scored his first brace for Tooting & Mitcham United, against Waltham Abbey in a 2–1 win. Ghandour ended the 2018–19 season with seven goals in 25 league appearances.

==== 2019–20: Four goals in one game ====
Ghandour's first goal of the 2019–20 season came on 20 August 2019, in a 3–1 home win against Ashford Town. On 7 December 2019, he scored four goals against Chertsey Town, helping his side win 5–0. The player stated in an interview: "It's just surreal. To score four goals – at any level – is crazy. It doesn't come around often at all." Ghandour scored six goals in 17 league appearances – seven in 31 in all competitions. For his performances, Ghandour was nominated 2019–20 Tooting & Mitcham United Managers' Player of the Season, and Supporters' Most Improved Player of the Season.

=== Charlton Athletic ===
==== 2020–21: Professional debut ====
In January 2020, Ghandour went on an eight-week trial to Championship side Charlton Athletic, for whom he had already trialed a few years prior. On 14 August 2020, Ghandour signed for the Charlton Athletic Under-23s on a one-year contract, with an option to extend for a further year. On 15 October 2020, he made his debut in the Professional Development League against QPR, becoming the first Lebanese to do so. He played as a winger, helping create Charlton's second goal in a 3–0 win.

Ghandour made his senior professional debut on 10 November 2020, playing as a starter against Leyton Orient in the EFL Trophy. The match ended in a 3–1 win, with Ghandour providing a key pass to help set-up the 1–0 lead. Ghandour scored his first goal for the Under-23s against Bristol City on 30 November 2020, scoring a chip goal following an individual run where he beat three defenders. On 11 January 2021, Ghandour scored a brace for the Under-23s in a 4–0 home win against Cardiff City. Charlton Athletic exercised the option of an extra year on 18 May.

==== 2021–22 season: Loans to Maidstone United and Chelmsford City ====
Ghandour scored his first goal for Charlton on 24 July 2021, equalising in a 1–1 pre-season friendly draw against Reading. Ghandour made his EFL Cup debut on 10 August, as a starter in a 1–0 defeat against AFC Wimbledon.

On 21 October 2021, Ghandour joined Maidstone United in the National League South on a one-month loan. He made his debut on 23 October, as a starter in a 2–0 defeat to Dorking Wanderers. Ghandour finished his loan spell with five games.

Ghandour was once again loaned out to the National League South, joining Chelmsford City on 7 January 2022. He played his first game on 11 January, starting against Bowers & Pitsea in the Essex Senior Cup; City lost on penalty shoot-outs following a 0–0 draw after regular time. Ghandour's first league game came four days later, in a 0–0 home draw against Welling United. On 17 January, he provided an assist in a 1–1 draw against St Albans City. He played five games in the league and cup.

On 11 March 2022, Ghandour returned to Maidstone United on loan for the rest of the 2021–22 season. He made his second debut on 15 March, as an 86th-minute substitute in a 2–0 win against Dulwich Hamlet. Ghandour scored against Chelmsford City on 30 April, to help his side win 3–1; with the three points, Maidstone were mathematically crowned National League South champions. He finished the season with two goals in 10 games for the club.

On 23 May 2022, it was announced that Ghandour was leaving Charlton Athletic at the end of his contract.

=== Maidstone United ===
On 21 June 2022, Ghandour signed on a permanent basis with his former loan club Maidstone United ahead of the 2022–23 National League. Ghandour was sidelined throughout September due to an adductor muscle injury. He underwent an operation for a double hernia repair in October, and was due to recover within two to four weeks. On 15 February 2023, the club announced the departure of Ghandour by mutual consent.

=== Aldershot Town ===
On 26 April 2023, Ghandour signed for National League club Aldershot Town on a contract through the end of the 2023–24 season. On 22 December 2023, he joined National League South side Farnborough on a one-month loan, which was later extended to two months. During his time at Farnborough, Ghandour made nine appearances and scored six goals before being recalled by Aldershot in March 2024 to support their promotion campaign.

Ghandour signed a new contract with Aldershot Town on 24 April 2024 for the 2024–25 season. He began the season strongly, scoring twice in the opening match against Forest Green Rovers. On 5 December 2024, he returned to Farnborough on an initial one-month loan. However, a shoulder injury sidelined him until the end of the season, when he recovered in time to participate in Aldershot's successful 2024–25 FA Trophy campaign.

On 3 July 2025, Ghandour extended his contract with Aldershot Town for the 2025–26 season. On 27 April 2026, it was announced that Ghandour would leave the club at the end of his contract in June.

=== Eastleigh ===
On 29 June 2026, Ghandour joined National League side Eastleigh on a permanent deal.

== International career ==
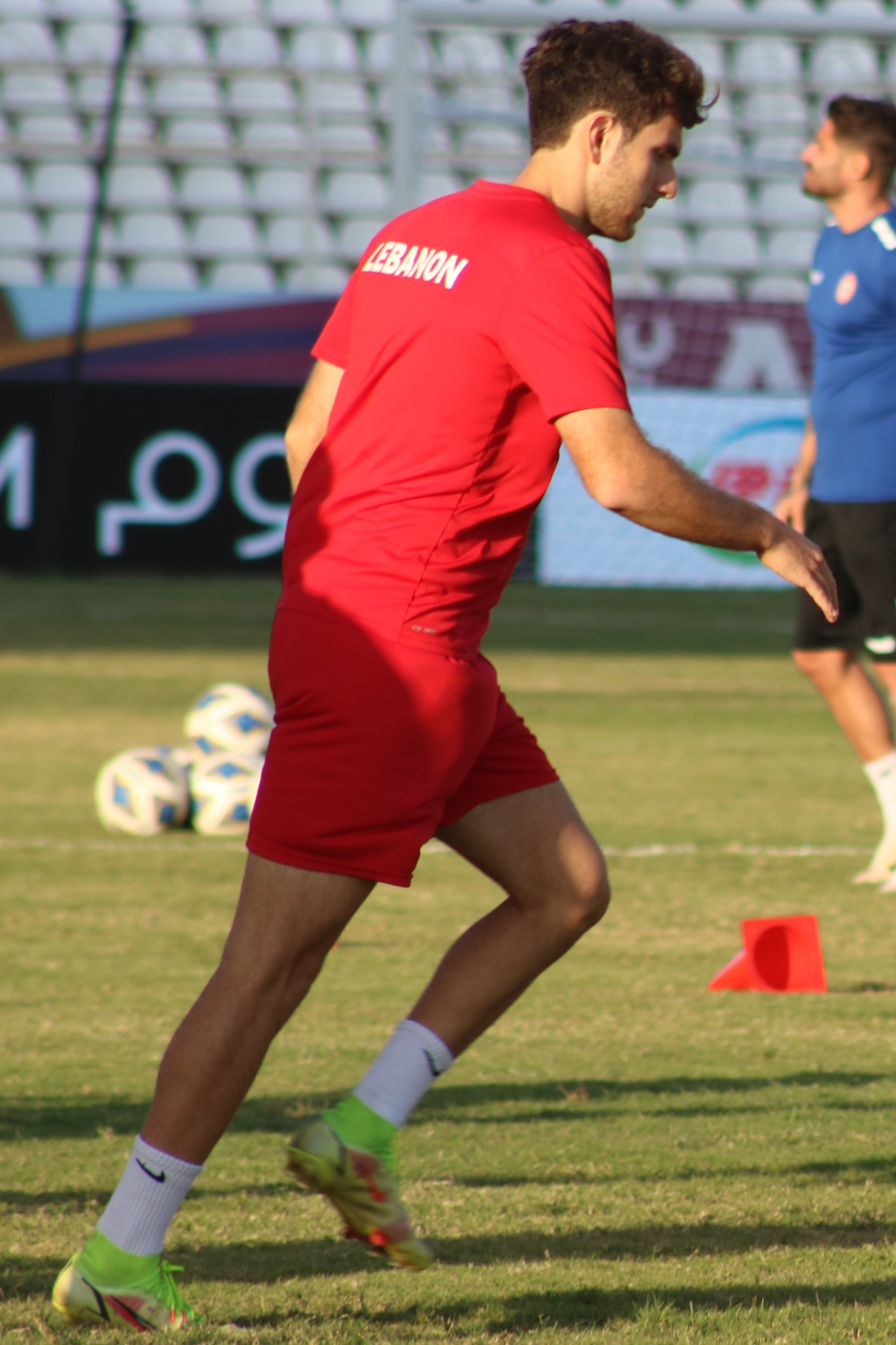
Ghandour training with the Lebanon national team in 2021

=== Youth ===
Born in England, Ghandour is eligible to represent Lebanon internationally through his parents. In 2015 he made his debut for the Lebanon U16 team, scoring in a friendly game against Syria which Lebanon won 3–2. Ghandour participated in the 2016 AFC U-16 Championship qualifications, playing in all three group stage games. Lebanon failed to qualify to the final tournament, finishing last in their group.

In 2017 Ghandour represented Lebanon U19 at the 2018 AFC Championship qualification, playing against Iraq and Qatar. Regarding his match against the latter, Ghandour stated: "When I played in Qatar it was on TV, so my mum could watch from London. Singing the anthem was an incredible feeling – very emotional. It's 100 per cent the best thing I've ever done". As Lebanon lost both games, they failed to qualify for the final tournament, finishing last in their group.

Ghandour was due to join the Lebanon U23 camp in Iraq in January 2021; however, due to COVID-19 restrictions, he was not able to join the national team.

=== Senior ===
Ghandour was called up to the senior team ahead of the 2022 FIFA World Cup qualification matches against the United Arab Emirates and South Korea in September 2021. He made his debut on 7 September, coming on as an 85th-minute substitute in a 1–0 defeat away to South Korea.

== Style of play ==
Ghandour is a dynamic striker who has also played as a winger on occasion, and can also play as an attacking midfielder. His main characteristics are his work rate and tactical understanding; he "creates space for his team mates", and has been praised for "his hard work" and "dedication to get stronger and fitter".

Upon Ghandour's loan move to Chelmsford, manager Robbie Simpson labelled him as a player who can "score goals" and is a "great runner", who "can play in any of our top three positions".

== Personal life ==
Ghandour is a supporter of English club Leeds United, and his favourite player is Robert Lewandowski, also citing David Beckham as a source of inspiration. Ghandour studied at Cass Business School, and at City, University of London.

== Career statistics ==
=== Club ===
As of match played 25 April 2026

Appearances and goals by club, season and competition
Club	Season	League			FA Cup		League Cup		Other		Total	
Club	Season	Division	Apps	Goals	Apps	Goals	Apps	Goals	Apps	Goals	Apps	Goals
Tooting & Mitcham United	2018–19	Isthmian South Central	25	7	0	0	0	0	2 (Note: One appearance in Alan Turvey Trophy, one appearance in London Senior Cup)	0	27	7
Tooting & Mitcham United	2019–20	Isthmian South Central	17	6	4	0	0	0	10 (Note: Four appearances and one goal in FA Trophy, one appearance in Surrey Senior Cup, three appearances in Alan Turvey Trophy, two appearances in London Senior Cup)	1	31	7
Tooting & Mitcham United	Total		42	13	4	0	0	0	12	1	58	14
Charlton Athletic	2020–21	League One	0	0	0	0	0	0	1 (Note: Appearance in EFL Trophy)	0	1	0
Charlton Athletic	2021–22	League One	0	0	0	0	1	0	0	0	1	0
Charlton Athletic	Total		0	0	0	0	1	0	1	0	2	0
Maidstone United (loan)	2021–22	National League South	5	0	—		—		0	0	5	0
Chelmsford City (loan)	2021–22	National League South	4	0	—		—		1 (Note: Appearance in Essex Senior Cup)	0	5	0
Maidstone United (loan)	2021–22	National League South	10	2	—		—		0	0	10	2
Maidstone United	2022–23	National League	10	0	0	0	—		1 (Note: Appearance in FA Trophy)	0	11	0
Aldershot Town	2023–24	National League	8	0	0	0	—		0	0	8	0
Aldershot Town	2024–25	National League	20	3	2	0	—		2 (Note: Appearance(s) in National League Cup)	0	24	3
Aldershot Town	2025–26	National League	30	5	1	0	—		5 (Note: Four appearances and four goals in National League Cup, one appearance in FA Trophy)	4	36	9
Aldershot Town	Total		58	8	3	0	0	0	7	4	68	12
Farnborough (loan)	2023–24	National League South	9	6	—		—		—		9	6
Farnborough (loan)	2024–25	National League South	1	0	—		—		—		1	0
Career total			139	29	7	0	1	0	22	5	169	34

=== International ===
As of match 7 September 2021

Appearances and goals by national team and year
National team	Year	Apps	Goals
Lebanon U16	2015	4	1
Lebanon U19	2017	2	0
Lebanon	2021	1	0
Career total		7	1

== Honours ==
Maidstone United

- National League South: 2021–22

Aldershot Town

- FA Trophy: 2024–25

Individual

- Tooting & Mitcham United Managers' Player of the Season: 2019–20
- Tooting & Mitcham United Supporters' Most Improved Player of the Season: 2019–20

== See also ==
- List of Lebanon international footballers born outside Lebanon
