= Jonathan Fortune =

English footballer (born 1980)

Personal information
- Full name: Jonathan Jay Fortune
- Date of birth: 23 August 1980 (age 46)
- Place of birth: Islington, London, England
- Height: 6 ft 2 in (1.88 m)
- Position: Defender

Youth career
- 1996–1998: Charlton Athletic

Senior career*
Years	Team	Apps	(Gls)
1998–2009	Charlton Athletic	166	(6)
2000	→ Mansfield Town (loan)	4	(0)
2000	→ Mansfield Town (loan)	14	(0)
2007	→ Stoke City (loan)	4	(0)
2007	→ Stoke City (loan)	10	(1)
2009–2010	Sheffield United	5	(1)
2010–2011	Charlton Athletic	16	(0)
2012	Exeter City	5	(0)
2012–2013	Barnet	6	(0)
2013	Chatham Town	2	(0)
2013	Dagenham & Redbridge	1	(0)
Total		233	(8)
- * Club domestic league appearances and goals

Jonathan Jay Fortune (born 23 August 1980) is an English former professional footballer. His last known club was Dagenham & Redbridge, whom he left in 2013.

== Career ==
=== Charlton Athletic ===
After coming through the Charlton youth ranks and two loan spells at Mansfield Town, Fortune made his Charlton début during the 2001–02 season and became a regular figure in the Charlton first team. On the final day of the 2004–05 season, he scored a late equaliser against Charlton's local rivals Crystal Palace, which led in their relegation, while West Bromwich Albion survived.

He was loaned to Stoke City in January prior to the transfer deadline. However, he was recalled by Charlton on 27 February 2007 after only four league appearances for Stoke. On 8 March, Fortune was re-signed by Stoke City on loan until the end of the season, and scored his first Stoke goal against Southampton in March 2007.

On 2 August, it was revealed that Charlton had accepted a bid from Stoke City for Fortune. However, on 4 August, after Charlton's friendly against Sporting Braga, Charlton boss Alan Pardew confirmed that Fortune had decided to commit himself to the club.

Fortune was criticised by his own manager after he punched Ipswich Town player Alan Lee in an off-the-ball incident after the final whistle on 8 December. Pardew claimed "It was a stupid thing for him to do. He will be fined and it will cost him his place in the team."

=== Sheffield United ===
Fortune joined Sheffield United on trial, and featured in a 3–0 friendly win at Bury in July 2009. After overcoming a knee injury, he signed a short-term deal for the Blades in September of that year. Signed as first team cover, Fortune had to wait until early November to make his début in Blades colours in an away match at Barnsley. Despite being dogged by further injuries, Fortune signed an extension on his contract with Sheffield United during the January transfer window, keeping him at Bramall Lane until the end of the 2009–10 season. He rewarded the Blades' faith in him by scoring his first goal for the club in the very next league game, a 3–0 home win against Reading. Despite this he made only a handful of further appearances for the Blades and was released at the end of that season when his contract expired. On 26 August 2010, after training with former club Charlton for most of the summer, it was revealed that Fortune was in the process of discussing a contract with his old club.

=== Return to Charlton Athletic ===
On 31 August 2010, Fortune re-signed for Charlton on a free transfer keeping him at the club initially until Christmas. This was, however, extended until the end of the season. He was released at the end of the campaign following an injury which would keep him out long-term.

=== Exeter City ===
Fortune signed for League One club, Exeter City on 9 March 2012, until the end of the season. On his debut he scored an own goal against MK Dons. Fortune went on to make five appearances for City before parting company with the club at the end of the season.

=== Barnet ===
Following his release from Exeter Fortune joined Football League Two side Barnet on 26 July 2012. He was named full-time captain of the side by Mark Robson shortly after joining the club. On 7 January 2013, Fortune left Barnet by mutual consent, having made only eight appearances between August and November, and having not played at all since then, being confined to appearing on the bench.

=== Chatham Town ===
In February 2013, in a bid to stay fit after his release by Barnet, Fortune joined Isthmian League Division One North club Chatham Town, for whom he made two appearances.

=== Dagenham & Redbridge ===
On 28 March 2013, Fortune signed for Dagenham & Redbridge until the end of the season. He made his debut as an 89th minute for Matthew Saunders in a 1–0 away win at Exeter City. On 7 May 2013, he was released by the Daggers due to the expiry of his contract.

== Career statistics ==
As of match played 30 March 2013

Club statistics
Club	Season	League			FA Cup		League Cup		Other		Total	
Club	Season	Division	Apps	Goals	Apps	Goals	Apps	Goals	Apps	Goals	Apps	Goals
Charlton Athletic	1998–99	Premier League	0	0	0	0	0	0	—		0	0
Charlton Athletic	1999–2000	First Division	0	0	0	0	0	0	—		0	0
Charlton Athletic	2000–01	Premier League	0	0	0	0	0	0	—		0	0
Charlton Athletic	2001–02	Premier League	19	0	2	0	2	1	—		23	1
Charlton Athletic	2002–03	Premier League	26	1	2	0	1	0	—		29	1
Charlton Athletic	2003–04	Premier League	28	2	1	0	2	0	—		31	2
Charlton Athletic	2004–05	Premier League	31	2	3	1	2	0	—		36	3
Charlton Athletic	2005–06	Premier League	11	0	2	1	0	0	—		13	1
Charlton Athletic	2006–07	Premier League	8	0	1	0	4	0	—		13	0
Charlton Athletic	2007–08	Championship	26	1	0	0	3	0	—		29	1
Charlton Athletic	2008–09	Championship	17	0	3	0	1	0	—		21	0
Charlton Athletic	Total		166	6	14	2	15	1	—		195	9
Mansfield Town (loan)	1999–2000	Third Division	4	0	0	0	0	0	0	0	4	0
Mansfield Town (loan)	2000–01	Third Division	14	0	0	0	0	0	0	0	14	0
Mansfield Town (loan)	Total		18	0	0	0	0	0	0	0	18	0
Stoke City (loan)	2006–07	Championship	14	1	0	0	0	0	—		14	1
Sheffield United	2009–10	Championship	5	1	1	0	0	0	—		6	1
Charlton Athletic	2010–11	League One	16	0	3	0	0	0	2 (Note: Appearance(s) in Football League Trophy)	0	21	0
Exeter City	2011–12	League One	5	0	0	0	0	0	0	0	5	0
Barnet	2012–13	League Two	6	0	1	0	1	0	0	0	8	0
Chatham Town	2012–13	Isthmian Division One North	2	0	0	0	0	0	0	0	2	0
Dagenham & Redbridge	2012–13	League Two	1	0	0	0	0	0	0	0	1	0
Career Total			233	8	19	2	16	1	2	0	270	11
