= Leo Dos Reis =

Spanish footballer (born 2003)

Personal information
- Full name: Leonardo Dos Reis Muñiz
- Date of birth: 23 January 2003 (age 23)
- Place of birth: Barcelona, Spain
- Position: Forward

Team information
- Current team: Cornellà
- Number: 23

Youth career
- –2006: Polaris World Cartagena (futsal)
- 2012–2015: Cornellà
- 2015–2021: Barcelona
- 2020–2021: → Cornellà (loan)
- 2021–2022: Birmingham City
- 2022–2023: Monza

Senior career*
Years	Team	Apps	(Gls)
2023–2024	Girona B	6	(1)
2024	Martina		
2024–2025	Marbellí	3	(0)
2025	Cerdanyola del Vallès	10	(3)
2025–	Cornellà	0	(0)

International career
2019	Spain U16	4	(0)
- * Club domestic league appearances and goals as of 13:02, 14 July 2025 (UTC)~

Leonardo Dos Reis Muñiz (born 23 January 2003) is a Spanish professional footballer who plays as a forward for Spanish club Cornellà.

== Club career ==
=== Youth ===
Following his father's footsteps, Dos Reis began playing futsal at a young age at Polaris World Cartagena. He then switched to football, moving to Cornellà's youth academy in the 2012–13 season. Despite Barcelona showing interest in signing him to their futsal team, Dos Reis remained at Cornellà until 2014–15. He eventually joined Barcelona's youth academy in the 2015–16 season, aged 11. He was sent back on loan to Cornella in 2020–21.

On 26 January 2022, Dos Reis signed for Birmingham City, joining their Under-23s squad. His contract was extended by 12 months on 17 May. He scored three goals in nine games for the Under-23s in the first half of the 2021–22 season.

On 31 January 2022, Serie B side Monza purchased Dos Reis on an 18-month contract, with an option for a further year. He was integrated into Monza's Primavera 2 (under-19) squad, helping them reach the 2021–22 promotion play-offs. Dos Reis received his first senior call-up by Monza ahead of their Coppa Italia game against Udinese on 19 October 2022.

=== Girona B ===
In summer 2023, Dos Reis joined Girona B in the Tercera Federación.

== Style of play ==
Dos Reis is a physical striker who is also noted for his technique. His main characteristics are his hold-up play, first touch and finishing.

== Personal life ==
Dos Reis was born in Barcelona, Spain, to Brazilian father Marcelo Dos Reis Soares, a professional futsal player who moved to Spain in 1995. He holds both Spanish and Brazilian citizenships.
