= Dillon Hoogewerf =

Dutch footballer

Personal information
- Full name: Dillon Ifunanya Chukwu Hoogewerf
- Date of birth: 27 February 2003 (age 23)
- Place of birth: Almere, Netherlands
- Height: 1.65 m (5 ft 5 in)
- Position: Winger

Team information
- Current team: Grenoble
- Number: 23

Youth career
- 2008–2012: Almere City
- 2012–2019: Ajax
- 2019–2022: Manchester United
- 2022–2023: Borussia Mönchengladbach

Senior career*
Years	Team	Apps	(Gls)
2022–2024	Borussia Mönchengladbach II	24	(1)
2024–2026	Vitesse	58	(8)
2026–	Grenoble	4	(0)

International career^{‡}
2017–2018	Netherlands U15	8	(6)
2018–2019	Netherlands U16	5	(2)
2019	Netherlands U17	6	(3)
- * Club domestic league appearances and goals as of 6 November 2026 ‡ National team caps and goals as of 3 August 2024

Dillon Ifunanya Chukwu Hoogewerf (born 27 February 2003) is a Dutch professional footballer who plays as a winger for French Ligue 2 club Grenoble.

== Early life ==
Hoogewerf was born to a Dutch father and a Nigerian mother, making him eligible for both the Netherlands and Nigeria national team.

== Club career ==
In the 2018–19 season, Hoogewerf tallied ten goals and six assists, while averaging a goal every 167 minutes for the Ajax U17 team.

On 1 June 2019, Hoogewerf announced that he was moving from Ajax to Manchester United after rejecting a contract offer from the Dutch club. He was Ole Gunnar Solskjær's first signing as Manchester United manager. He signed his first professional contract in March 2020.

On 28 November 2020, Hoogewerf scored his first hat-trick for United in a 4–1 victory over the Newcastle U18s.

On 31 January 2022, Hoogewerf was signed by Borussia Mönchengladbach for its reserve team.

On 8 August 2024, Hoogewerf signed a contract with Vitesse for two seasons, with an option for a third.

On 7 July 2026, Hoogewerf joined Grenoble in French Ligue 2.

== International career ==
Hoogewerf played 6 games for the Netherlands national under-17 football team and 5 for the U16s.
