= Kasim Aidoo =

English footballer (born 2001)

Personal information
- Full name: Kasim Ishmael Amu-Kadar Aidoo
- Date of birth: 3 November 2001 (age 25)
- Position: Defender

Team information
- Current team: Farnborough

Youth career
- –2020: Charlton Athletic

Senior career*
Years	Team	Apps	(Gls)
2020–2021	Charlton Athletic	4	(0)
2021	Eastbourne Borough	4	(0)
2021–2022	Cray Wanderers	32	(0)
2022–2023	Potters Bar Town	27	(4)
2023	Hastings United	11	(0)
2023–2024	Haringey Borough	20	(2)
2024	Potters Bar Town	14	(1)
2024–2026	Chatham Town	69	(1)
2026–	Farnborough	0	(0)
- * Club domestic league appearances and goals as of 10:32, 25 June 2026 (UTC)

Kasim Ishmael Amu-Kadar Aidoo (born 3 November 2001) is an English professional footballer who plays as a defender for National League South club Farnborough.

== Career ==
=== Charlton Athletic ===
He made his debut for Charlton Athletic on 10 November 2020 in a 3–1 EFL Trophy victory over Leyton Orient.

On 18 May 2021, it was announced that Aidoo would leave Charlton Athletic at the end of his contract.

=== Non-League ===
On 28 August 2021, Aidoo joined Eastbourne Borough. He made his debut the same day, playing against Oxford City.

On 27 September 2021, Aidoo joined Cray Wanderers.

After finishing the previous season at Cray Wanderers, Aidoo joined league rivals Potters Bar Town on 13 June 2022. He scored his first goal for the club in a FA cup win over Aveley on 6 September 2022. In March 2023, he joined Hastings United.

He returned to Potters Bar Town in February 2024.

== Career statistics ==
As of 27 February 2024

Appearances and goals by club, season and competition
Club	Season	League			FA Cup		League Cup		Other		Total	
Club	Season	Division	Apps	Goals	Apps	Goals	Apps	Goals	Apps	Goals	Apps	Goals
Charlton Athletic	2020–21	League One	0	0	0	0	0	0	1 (Note: Appearance(s) in EFL Trophy)	0	1	0
Eastbourne Borough	2021–22	National League South	4	0	0	0	—		0	0	4	0
Cray Wanderers	2021–22	Isthmian League Premier Division	26	0	0	0	—		3 (Note: Appearance(s) in FA Trophy)	0	29	0
Potters Bar Town	2022–23	Isthmian League Premier Division	27	4	3	1	—		4 (Note: One appearance in FA Trophy, three appearances and two goals in Alan Turvey Trophy)	3	34	8
Hastings United	2022–23	Isthmian League Premier Division	10	0	0	0	—		2 (Note: Appearance(s) in Sussex Senior Challenge Cup)	0	12	0
Hastings United	2023–24	Isthmian League Premier Division	1	0	0	0	—		0	0	1	0
Hastings United	Total		11	0	0	0	0	0	2	0	13	0
Haringey Borough	2023–24	Isthmian League Premier Division	20	2	4	1	—		6 (Note: One appearance in London County Cup, two appearances in FA Trophy and three appearances in Alan Turvey Trophy)	0	30	3
Career total			88	6	7	2	0	0	16	3	111	11
