= Adam Gross =

English-Welsh footballer

Personal information
- Full name: Adam Charles Gross
- Date of birth: 16 February 1986 (age 40)
- Place of birth: Greenwich, England
- Height: 5 ft 10 in (1.78 m)
- Position: Defender

Youth career
- 2002–2004: Charlton Athletic

Senior career*
Years	Team	Apps	(Gls)
2004–2005	Charlton Athletic	0	(0)
2005–2007	Barnet	47	(1)
2007–2009	Grays Athletic	33	(0)
2008	→ Weymouth (loan)	4	(0)
2008	→ Welling United (loan)		
2008–2009	→ Dartford (loan)		
2009–2010	Dartford		
2010–2011	Thurrock		
2011–2012	Erith & Belvedere		
2012–2013	Leatherhead		
2013–2016	Cray Valley Paper Mills		

International career
- Wales Yth
- England C
- Wales under-23 semi-professional
- * Club domestic league appearances and goals as of 11:45, 21 January 2011 (UTC)

Adam Charles Gross (born 16 February 1986) is an English footballer. He played a handful of games for Wales at youth level. He has also represented England on a number of occasions, turning out for the National Game XI.
