= 2019 NCAA Division I men's soccer rankings =

- Season: 2019
- NCAA tournament: 2019
- Preseason No. 1: Maryland (U. Soc. Coaches, Top Drawer Soccer); Wake Forest (College Soccer News); North Carolina (Soccer America)
- NCAA Tournament Champions: Georgetown
NCAA Division I men's soccer rankings


Four major human polls make up the 2019 NCAA Division I men's soccer rankings: United Soccer Coaches, Top Drawer Soccer, Soccer America, and CollegeSoccerNews.com.

== Legend ==
	Increase in ranking
	Decrease in ranking
	New to rankings from previous week
Italics	Number of first place votes
(#–#–#)	Win–loss–tie record
т	Tied with team above or below also with this symbol

== United Soccer Coaches ==
	Preseason Aug 6	Week 1 Sep 3	Week 2 Sep 10	Week 3 Sep 17	Week 4 Sep 24	Week 5 Oct 1	Week 6 Oct 8	Week 7 Oct 15	Week 8 Oct 22	Week 9 Oct 29	Week 10 Nov 5	Week 11 Nov 12	Week 12 Nov 19	Final Dec 17	
1.	Maryland (13)	Wake Forest (16) (2–0–0)	Wake Forest (24) (4–0–0)	Wake Forest (26) (5–0–0)	Stanford (19) (6–0–0)	Virginia (20) (8–0–0)	Virginia (25) (10–0–0)	Virginia (22) (10–0–1)	Washington (21) (12–1–0)	Washington (21) (14–1–0)	Washington (23) (14–1–0)	Clemson (19) (15–1–1)	Virginia (27) (17–1–1)	Georgetown (25) (20–1–3)	1.
2.	Indiana (6)	Indiana (3) (2–0–0)	Duke (2) (4–0–0)	Stanford (5–0–0)	Georgetown (3) (6–0–0)	Stanford (7) (7–0–1)	Washington (10–1–0)	Washington (4) (11–1–0)	Wake Forest (2) (12–2–0)	Clemson (4) (13–1–1)	Clemson (1) (14–1–1)	Virginia (6) (15–1–1)	Georgetown (15–1–3)	Virginia (21–1–2)	2.
3.	Akron (2)	Maryland (9) (1–1–0)	Stanford (3–0–0)	Georgetown (1) (5–0–0)	Virginia (4) (6–0–0)	Wake Forest (8–1–0)	SMU (1) (9–0–1)	SMU (10–0–1)	Clemson (11–1–1)	Georgetown (1) (13–1–1)	Georgetown (2) (14–1–1)	Georgetown (14–1–2)	Clemson (16–2–1)	Wake Forest (1) (16–5–2)	3.
4.	Wake Forest (4)	Stanford (2) (2–0–0)	Indiana (1) (3–0–1)	Indiana (1) (3–0–1)	Clemson (7–0–0)	SMU (8–0–0)	Indiana (1) (7–1–2)	Wake Forest (1) (10–2–0)	St. John's (2) (12–1–0)	Virginia (13–1–1)	Virginia (1) (14–1–1)	Stanford (1) (13–1–3)	Washington (15–3–0)	Stanford (1) (14–3–5)	4.
5.	Stanford	Duke (2–0–0)	Georgetown (1) (4–0–0)	Virginia (3–0–0)	Indiana (1) (4–0–2)	Georgetown (7–1–0)	Charlotte (8–0–2)	Stanford (9–1–2)	Stanford (9–1–2)	Stanford (1) (10–1–2)	Stanford (12–1–2)	UCF (13–1–2)	SMU (16–1–1)	Clemson (18–2–1)	5.
6.	North Carolina (2)	Georgetown (2–0–0)	Virginia (3–0–0)	Saint Mary's (5–0–0)	Saint Mary's (7–0–0)	Clemson (8–1–0)	Wake Forest (8–2–0)	Indiana (8–1–3)	Virginia (11–1–1)	UCF (10–1–2)	UCF (12–1–2)	Washington (1) (14–3–0)	Indiana (14–2–4)	Washington (17–4–0)	6.
7.	Michigan State	Virginia (2–0–0)	Saint Mary's (4–0–0)	Clemson (5–0–0)	Wake Forest (6–1–0)	Washington (8–1–0)	Stanford (7–1–2)	St. John's (11–1–0)	Georgetown (1) (11–1–1)	Wake Forest (12–3–1)	Wake Forest (13–3–1)	Wake Forest (13–3–2)	Stanford (13–2–3)	SMU (18–2–1)	7.
8.	Kentucky	Saint Mary's (2–0–0)	Washington (4–0–0)	SMU (6–0–0)	SMU (7–0–0)	Indiana (5–1–2)	Saint Mary's (9–1–0)	Clemson (10–1–1)	UCF (9–1–2)	St. John's (12–2–1)	St. John's (13–2–1)	Indiana (13–2–3)	UCF (14–2–2)	UC Santa Barbara (15–5–4)	8.
9.	Notre Dame	Kentucky (1–0–0)	Virginia Tech (4–0–0)	St. John's (6–0–0)	St. John's (7–0–0)	Charlotte (6–0–2)	UCF (7–1–2)	Saint Mary's (10–1–0)	Missouri State (12–0–0)	Missouri State (13–0–0)	Indiana (12–2–3)	Missouri State (16–0–0)	Wake Forest (13–4–2)	Indiana (15–3–4)	9.
10.	Duke	Virginia Tech (2–0–0)	Notre Dame (3–0–0)	Charlotte (3–0–2)	Washington (7–1–0)	Saint Mary's (8–1–0)	St. John's (9–1–0)	Charlotte (8–0–3)	Indiana (8–2–3)	Indiana (10–2–3)	Missouri State (15–0–0)	SMU (14–1–1)	Saint Mary's (16–1–0)	UCF (15–3–2)	10.
11.	Saint Mary's	Notre Dame (1–0–0)	Xavier (3–0–0)	North Carolina (3–1–1)	Charlotte (4–0–2)	UCF (6–1–1)	Clemson (9–1–1)	UCF (8–1–2)	FIU (9–0–4)	Saint Mary's (12–1–0)	SMU (13–1–1)	Saint Mary's (15–1–0)	Marshall (15–2–3)	Marshall (16–3–3)	11.
12.	Virginia	Coastal Carolina (2–0–0)	Charlotte (3–0–0)	Washington (5–1–0)	UCF (5–1–2)	St. John's (8–1–0)	Georgetown (7–1–1)	FIU (9–0–3)	SMU (10–1–1)	SMU (12–1–1)	Saint Mary's (14–1–0)	Penn State (12–2–3)	Missouri State (17–0–1)	St. John's (14–5–1)	12.
13.	Georgetown	Washington (2–0–0)	Clemson (4–0–0)	UCF (3–1–1)	Cal State Fullerton (7–0–0)	FIU (7–0–2)	New Hampshire (8–0–2)	Georgetown (10–1–1)	Saint Mary's (11–1–0)	FIU (9–0–5)	Penn State (11–2–3)	Marshall (13–2–3)	Penn State (12–3–3)	Virginia Tech (10–6–3)	13.
14.	Louisville	Xavier (2–0–0)	Florida Gulf Coast (3–0–1)	Cal State Fullerton (6–0–0)	North Carolina (4–1–2)	Cal State Fullerton (8–0–1)	Missouri State (9–0–0)	Missouri State (11–0–0)	New Hampshire (10–0–2)	New Hampshire (12–0–2)	Marshall (12–2–3)	St. John's (13–3–1)	St. John's (13–4–1)	Providence (16–7–0)	14.
15.	UCF	UCF (1–1–0)	Coastal Carolina (2–1–0)	Duke (4–1–0)	New Hampshire (5–0–2)	New Hampshire (7–0–2)	FIU (7–0–3)	New Hampshire (9–0–2)	Marshall (10–1–2)	Kentucky (9–2–3)	UC Santa Barbara (11–3–4)	Kentucky (11–3–3)	Charlotte (11–3–4)	St. Mary's (16–2–0)	15.
16.	Virginia Tech	Michigan State (0–0–2)	UCF (2–1–1)	Notre Dame (3–1–0)	FIU (5–0–2)	James Madison (7–2–0)	Kentucky (6–1–2)	San Diego (9–1–1)	Kentucky (8–2–3)	Penn State (9–2–3)	Kentucky (10–3–3)	UC Santa Barbara (12–3–4)	New Hampshire (14–1–3)	Missouri State (18–1–1)	16.
17.	James Madison	Charlotte (2–0–0)	Kentucky (2–1–0)	Virginia Tech (4–1–0)	Louisville (3–1–2)	Missouri State (7–0–0)	James Madison (8–2–1)	UC Santa Barbara (9–2–2)	Charlotte (8–1–4)	Maryland (9–4–2)	Charlotte (10–2–4)	Charlotte (10–2–4)	Michigan (11–4–5)	Michigan (11–5–6)	17.
18.	Denver	Florida Gulf Coast (1–0–1)	North Carolina (2–1–1)	New Hampshire (3–0–2)	Virginia Tech (5–2–0)	Duke (5–3–0)	North Carolina (6–2–2)	James Madison (9–3–1)	San Diego (10–2–1)	Charlotte (9–2–4)	New Hampshire (12–1–2)	New Hampshire (12–1–3)	UC Davis (13–4–2)	Penn State (12–4–3)	18.
19.	Air Force	Clemson (2–0–0)	St. John's (3–0–0)	Xavier (3–1–1)	Missouri State (6–0–0)	Kentucky (5–1–2)	Navy (11–0–0)	North Carolina (7–3–2)	Penn State (8–2–2)	UC Santa Barbara (10–3–4)	FIU (9–1–5)	Virginia Tech (9–5–3)	Kentucky (12–4–3)	Seattle (15–3–5)	19.
20.	Portland	North Carolina (0–1–1)	Louisville (2–1–1)	West Virginia (2–1–1)	James Madison (5–2–0)	North Carolina (4–2–2)	NC State (6–2–1)	Kentucky (6–2–3)	UC Santa Barbara (10–3–2)	Marshall (10–2–3)	Oral Roberts (13–2–0)	UNC Wilmington (12–4–2)	Seattle (14–3–4)	Louisville (10–8–2)	20.
21.	Charlotte	Akron (0–2–0)	New Hampshire (2–0–2)	Kentucky (2–1–2)	Notre Dame (3–2–1)	Navy (9–0–0)	Duke (6–3–1)	Marshall (8–1–2)	North Carolina (7–4–2)	James Madison (10–5–2)	UNC Wilmington (11–4–2)	Seattle (13–3–3)	Providence (14–6–0)	Charlotte (12–4–4)	21.
22.	Oregon State	New Hampshire (2–0–0)	SMU (4–0–0)	FIU (4–0–1)	Rutgers (5–0–2)	Virginia Tech (5–2–1)	Virginia Tech (6–2–2)	Navy (11–0–1)	Maryland (8–4–2)	Virginia Tech (7–4–2)	Virginia Tech (8–5–2)	Maryland (10–6–2)	UC Santa Barbara (12–4–4)	New Hampshire (15–2–3)	22.
23.	West Virginia	UConn (1–0–0)	Cal State Fullerton (4–0–0)	CSUN (4–1–1)	Kentucky (3–1–2)	West Virginia (5–2–1)	San Diego (8–1–1)	NC State (7–3–1)	NC State (7–3–3)	San Diego (10–3–1)	Maryland (9–6–2)	FIU (9–2–5)	Virginia Tech (9–5–3)	Kentucky (13–5–3)	23.
24.	Michigan	West Virginia (1–1–0)	Maryland (1–2–0)	Rutgers (5–0–0)	Loyola Marymount (5–1–1)	Louisville (4–2–2)	Cal State Fullerton (8–2–1)	Yale (7–0–2)	Yale (9–1–2)	Oral Roberts (12–2–0)	UC Davis (11–4–2)	UC Davis (12–4–2)	Campbell (16–2–2)	Campbell (17–3–2)	24.
25.	UC Irvine	Air Force (1–0–0)	Bowling Green (3–0–1)	Maryland (3–2–0)	Navy (7–0–0)	San Diego (7–1–0)	Maryland (6–3–1)	Maryland (6–4–2)	Virginia Tech (7–3–2)	Louisville (8–5–2)	Western Michigan (11–5–1)	Pittsburgh (9–6–2)	Yale (13–2–2)	UC Davis (13–5–2)	25.
	Preseason Aug 6	Week 1 Sep 3	Week 2 Sep 10	Week 3 Sep 17	Week 4 Sep 24	Week 5 Oct 1	Week 6 Oct 8	Week 7 Oct 15	Week 8 Oct 22	Week 9 Oct 29	Week 10 Nov 5	Week 11 Nov 12	Week 12 Nov 19	Final Dec 17	
		Dropped: No. 14 Louisville; No. 17 James Madison; No. 18 Denver; No. 20 Portland; No. 22 Oregon State; No. 24 Michigan; No. 25 UC Irvine	Dropped: No. 16 Michigan State; No. 21 Akron; No. 23 UConn; No. 24 West Virginia; No. 25 Air Force	Dropped: No. 14 Florida Gulf Coast; No. 15 Coastal Carolina; No. 20 Louisville; No. 25 Bowling Green	Dropped: No. 15 Duke; No. 19 Xavier; No. 20 West Virginia; No. 23 CSUN; No. 25 Maryland	Dropped: No. 21 Notre Dame; No. 22 Rutgers; No. 24 Loyola Marymount	Dropped: No. 23 West Virginia; No. 24 Louisville	Dropped: No. 21 Duke; No. 22 Virginia Tech; No. 24 Cal State Fullerton	Dropped: No. 18 James Madison; No. 22 Navy	Dropped: No. 21 North Carolina; No. 23 NC State; No. 24 Yale	Dropped: No. 21 James Madison; No. 23 San Diego; No. 25 Louisville	Dropped: No. 20 Oral Roberts; No. 25 Western Michigan	Dropped: No. 20 UNC Wilmington; No. 22 Maryland; No. 23 FIU; No. 25 Pittsburgh	Dropped: No. 25 Yale	

== Top Drawer Soccer ==
	Preseason Jul 15	Week 1 Aug 29	Week 2 Sep 2	Week 3 Sep 8	Week 4 Sep 16	Week 5 Sep 23	Week 6 Sep 30	Week 7 Oct 7	Week 8 Oct 14	Week 9 Oct 21	Week 10 Oct 28	Week 11 Nov 4	Week 12 Nov 11	Week 13 Nov 18	Week 14 Nov 25	Week 15 Dec 2	Week 16 Dec 9	Final Dec 16	
1.	Maryland	Maryland	Maryland (1–0–0)	Wake Forest (3–0–0)	Wake Forest (5–0–0)	Stanford (6–0–0)	Virginia (8–0–0)	Virginia (10–0–0)	Virginia (10–0–1)	Washington (12–1–0)	Washington (14–1–0)	Washington (14–1–0)	Virginia (15–1–1)	Virginia (17–1–1)	Virginia (18–1–1)	Virginia (19–1–1)	Virginia (20–1–1)	Georgetown (19–1–4)	1.
2.	Akron	Akron	Wake Forest (2–0–0)	Stanford (2–0–0)	Stanford (5–0–0)	Virginia (6–0–0)	SMU (8–0–0)	Washington (11–1–0)	Washington (11–1–0)	Georgetown (11–1–1)	Georgetown (13–1–1)	Georgetown (14–1–1)	Georgetown (14–1–2)	Georgetown (15–1–3)	Georgetown (16–1–3)	Georgetown (17–1–3)	Georgetown (18–1–3)	Virginia (21–1–2)	2.
3.	Wake Forest	Wake Forest	Stanford (1–0–0)	Virginia (3–0–0)	Virginia (4–0–0)	Georgetown (6–0–0)	Stanford (7–0–1)	UCF (7–1–2)	UCF (8–1–2)	Virginia (11–1–1)	Virginia (13–1–1)	Virginia (14–1–1)	UCF (13–1–2)	SMU (16–1–1)	SMU (17–1–1)	SMU (18–1–1)	Wake Forest (16–4–2)	Wake Forest (16–5–2)	3.
4.	Stanford	Stanford	Indiana (2–0–0)	Indiana (3–0–1)	Georgetown (5–0–0)	SMU (7–0–0)	Wake Forest (8–1–0)	SMU (9–0–1)	SMU (10–0–1)	Wake Forest (12–2–0)	UCF (10–1–2)	UCF (12–1–2)	Stanford (12–1–3)	Clemson (16–2–1)	Clemson (17–2–1)	Washington (17–3–0)	Stanford (14–2–5)	Stanford (14–3–5)	4.
5.	Indiana	Indiana	Kentucky (1–0–0)	Louisville (2–0–1)	Indiana (3–0–1)	Wake Forest (6–1–0)	Georgetown (7–1–0)	Louisville (5–3–2)	Georgetown (9–1–1)	Clemson (11–1–1)	Clemson (13–1–1)	Clemson (14–1–1)	Washington (14–2–0)	Washington (15–3–0)	Washington (16–3–0)	UC Santa Barbara (15–4–4)	SMU (18–2–1)	SMU (18–2–1)	5.
6.	Kentucky	Kentucky	Michigan State (0–0–1)	Georgetown (3–0–0)	Duke (4–1–0)	Saint Mary's (7–0–0)	Clemson (8–1–0)	Georgetown (7–1–1)	Clemson (10–1–1)	UCF (9–1–2)	Maryland (9–4–2)	Stanford (12–1–2)	Clemson (15–1–1)	Indiana (14–2–4)	Indiana (15–2–4)	Clemson (18–2–1)	Washington (17–4–0)	Washington (17–4–0)	6.
7.	North Carolina	North Carolina	Duke (2–0–0)	Duke (4–0–0)	Saint Mary's (5–0–0)	Clemson (7–0–0)	Indiana (5–1–2)	Indiana (7–1–2)	Indiana (8–1–3)	Maryland (7–4–2)	Stanford (10–1–2)	Saint Mary's (14–1–0)	Saint Mary's (15–1–0)	Stanford (13–2–3)	Stanford (13–2–4)	Stanford (14–2–4)	UC Santa Barbara (15–5–4)	UC Santa Barbara (15–5–4)	7.
8.	Michigan State	Michigan State	Louisville (0–0–1)	Saint Mary's (3–0–0)	Clemson (5–0–0)	Indiana (4–0–2)	Charlotte (6–0–2)	Charlotte (8–0–2)	Charlotte (8–0–3)	Indiana (8–2–3)	Saint Mary's (12–1–0)	Indiana (12–2–3)	Indiana (13–2–3)	UCF (14–2–2)	UCF (15–2–2)	Wake Forest (15–4–2)	Clemson (18–2–2)	Clemson (18–2–2)	8.
9.	Louisville	Louisville	Georgetown (2–0–0)	Kentucky (2–1–0)	SMU (5–0–0)	St. John's (7–0–0)	UCF (6–1–1)	Wake Forest (8–2–0)	St. John's (11–1–0)	St. John's (12–1–0)	Indiana (10–2–3)	Wake Forest (13–3–1)	Wake Forest (13–3–2)	Saint Mary's (16–1–0)	Wake Forest (14–4–2)	Indiana (15–3–4)	Indiana (15–3–4)	Indiana (15–3–4)	9.
10.	Duke	Duke	Xavier (1–0–0)	Xavier (3–0–0)	Louisville (2–1–2)	Louisville (3–1–2)	Virginia Tech (5–2–1)	Stanford (7–1–2)	Wake Forest (10–2–0)	Stanford (9–1–2)	Wake Forest (12–3–1)	Penn State (11–2–3)	Penn State (12–2–3)	Wake Forest (13–4–2)	UC Santa Barbara (14–4–4)	UCF (15–3–2)	UCF (15–3–2)	UCF (15–3–2)	10.
11.	Georgetown	Georgetown	UCF (1–1–0)	Washington (4–0–0)	Xavier (3–1–1)	Xavier (3–2–1)	Louisville (4–2–2)	Clemson (9–1–1)	Stanford (9–1–2)	Saint Mary's (11–1–0)	SMU (12–1–1)	SMU (13–1–1)	SMU (14–1–1)	Michigan (11–4–5)	Virginia Tech (10–5–3)	Providence (16–7–0)	Providence (16–7–0)	Providence (16–7–0)	11.
12.	Denver	Denver	Akron (0–1–0)	Clemson (3–0–0)	Florida Gulf Coast (3–2–1)	North Carolina (4–1–2)	St. John's (8–1–0)	Virginia Tech (6–2–2)	UC Santa Barbara (9–2–2)	SMU (10–1–1)	St. John's (12–2–1)	St. John's (13–2–1)	Missouri State (16–0–0)	Virginia Tech (9–5–3)	Louisville (10–7–2)	Virginia Tech (10–6–3)	Virginia Tech (10–6–3)	Virginia Tech (10–6–3)	12.
13.	Michigan	Michigan	Washington (1–0–0)	UCLA (2–1–0)	Notre Dame (3–1–0)	Virginia Tech (5–2–0)	Washington (8–1–0)	Maryland (6–3–1)	San Diego (9–1–1)	Missouri State (12–0–0)	Missouri State (13–0–0)	Missouri State (15–0–0)	Virginia Tech (9–5–3)	UC Davis (13–4–2)	Providence (16–6–0)	Michigan (11–5–6)	Michigan (11–5–6)	Michigan (11–5–6)	13.
14.	Saint Mary's	Saint Mary's	Denver (0–1–0)	Florida Gulf Coast (3–0–1)	North Carolina (3–1–1)	UCF (5–1–1)	Kentucky (5–1–2)	St. John's (9–1–0)	Boston College (7–2–3)	New Hampshire (10–0–2)	New Hampshire (12–0–2)	Maryland (9–6–2)	Maryland (10–6–2)	Missouri State (17–0–1)	Marshall (16–2–3)	Louisville (10–8–2)	Louisville (10–8–2)	Louisville (10–8–2)	14.
15.	Virginia	Virginia	Saint Mary's (1–0–0)	Notre Dame (3–0–0)	Virginia Tech (4–1–0)	Charlotte (4–0–2)	Navy (9–0–0)	Kentucky (6–1–2)	Maryland (6–3–2)	Penn State (8–2–2)	Penn State (9–2–3)	Notre Dame (9–6–1)	New Hampshire (12–1–3)	Marshall (15–2–3)	St. John's (14–4–1)	Marshall (16–3–3)	Marshall (16–3–3)	Marshall (16–3–3)	15.
16.	Notre Dame	Notre Dame	Virginia (1–0–0)	SMU (3–0–0)	St. John's (6–0–0)	Loyola Marymount (5–1–1)	James Madison (7–2–0)	Navy (11–0–0)	Virginia Tech (6–3–2)	NC State (7–3–3)	Notre Dame (8–6–1)	Boston College (8–4–3)	St. John's (13–3–1)	Maryland (10–7–2)	Michigan (11–4–6)	St. John's (14–5–1)	St. John's (14–5–1)	St. John's (14–5–1)	16.
17.	UCF	UCF	Notre Dame (1–0–0)	Virginia Tech (4–0–0)	UCF (3–1–1)	Washington (7–1–0)	Cal State Fullerton (8–0–1)	James Madison (8–2–1)	NC State (7–3–1)	Virginia Tech (7–3–2)	FIU (9–0–5)	NC State (8–5–3)	Michigan (10–4–4)	St. John's (13–4–1)	Missouri State (18–1–1)	Missouri State (18–1–1)	Missouri State (18–1–1)	Missouri State (18–1–1)	17.
18.	Portland	Portland	Loyola (IL) (2–0–0)	Michigan (2–2–0)	Charlotte (3–0–2)	Kentucky (3–1–2)	UC Santa Barbara (6–2–1)	UC Santa Barbara (7–2–2)	North Carolina (7–3–2)	UC Santa Barbara (10–3–2)	Kentucky (9–2–3)	New Hampshire (12–1–2)	UC Santa Barbara (12–3–4)	New Hampshire (14–1–3)	Penn State (12–4–3)	Penn State (12–4–3)	Penn State (12–4–3)	Penn State (12–4–3)	18.
19.	Virginia Tech	Virginia Tech	Virginia Tech (2–0–0)	UCF (2–1–1)	UCLA (3–2–0)	James Madison (5–2–0)	Missouri State (7–0–0)	San Diego (8–1–1)	Notre Dame (7–4–1)	San Diego (10–2–1)	NC State (8–4–3)	Virginia Tech (8–5–2)	UC Davis (12–4–2)	Providence (14–6–0)	Charlotte (12–4–4)	Charlotte (12–4–4)	Charlotte (12–4–4)	Charlotte (12–4–4)	19.
20.	Charlotte	Charlotte	North Carolina (0–1–1)	Charlotte (3–0–0)	Kentucky (2–1–2)	Notre Dame (3–2–1)	Penn State (4–1–2)	Missouri State (9–0–0)	Louisville (5–4–2)	Louisville (7–4–2)	Virginia Tech (7–4–2)	Louisville (8–6–2)	Notre Dame (10–7–1)	Penn State (12–3–3)	Maryland (11–8–2)	Maryland (11–8–2)	Maryland (11–8–2)	Maryland (11–8–2)	20.
21.	UC Irvine	UC Irvine	Charlotte (1–0–0)	Maryland (1–2–0)	Loyola Marymount (4–1–0)	Duke (4–3–0)	FIU (7–0–2)	Penn State (5–2–2)	FIU (9–0–3)	Boston College (7–3–3)	Boston College (7–4–3)	Charlotte (10–2–4)	Boston College (8–5–3)	Loyola-Chicago (11–4–4)	UC Davis (13–5–2)	UC Davis (13–5–2)	UC Davis (13–5–2)	UC Davis (13–5–2)	21.
22.	NC State	NC State	NC State (1–1–0)	Cal State Fullerton (4–0–0)	CSUN (4–1–1)	Cal State Fullerton (7–0–0)	Loyola Marymount (5–2–2)	FIU (7–0–3)	Missouri State (11–0–0)	Notre Dame (7–5–1)	Louisville (8–5–2)	UC Santa Barbara (11–3–4)	Charlotte (10–2–4)	UC Santa Barbara (12–4–4)	Saint Mary's (16–2–0)	St. Mary's (16–2–0)	St. Mary's (16–2–0)	St. Mary's (16–2–0)	22.
23.	Air Force	Air Force	Air Force (1–0–0)	North Carolina (1–1–1)	Washington (5–1–0)	Navy (7–0–0)	New Hampshire (7–0–2)	New Hampshire (8–0–2)	Kentucky (6–2–3)	Charlotte (8–1–4)	Charlotte (9–2–4)	Kentucky (10–3–3)	Kentucky (11–3–3)	Notre Dame (10–7–1)	New Hampshire (15–2–3)	New Hampshire (15–2–3)	New Hampshire (15–2–3)	New Hampshire (15–2–3)	23.
24.	James Madison	James Madison	West Virginia (1–0–0)	NC State (2–1–0)	Cal State Fullerton (6–0–0)	Missouri State (6–0–0)	UTRGV (5–1–0)	UTRGV (6–2–0)	Navy (11–0–1)	FIU (9–0–4)	UC Santa Barbara (10–3–4)	Michigan (9–4–4)	Louisville (8–7–2)	Boston College (8–5–3)	Wright State (11–8–4)	Wright State (11–8–4)	Wright State (11–8–4)	Wright State (11–8–4)	24.
25.	West Virginia	West Virginia	Portland (0–1–1)	UC Berkeley (2–0–1)	Rutgers (5–0–0)	Rutgers (5–0–2)	Saint Mary's (8–1–0)	Cal State Fullerton (8–2–1)	New Hampshire (9–0–2)	Kentucky (8–2–3)	Syracuse (7–4–4)	Syracuse (7–5–4)	Syracuse (7–6–5)	Charlotte (11–3–4)	Boston College (9–6–3)	Boston College (9–6–3)	Boston College (9–6–3)	Boston College (9–6–3)	25.
	Preseason Jul 15	Week 1 Aug 29	Week 2 Sep 2	Week 3 Sep 8	Week 4 Sep 16	Week 5 Sep 23	Week 6 Sep 30	Week 7 Oct 7	Week 8 Oct 14	Week 9 Oct 21	Week 10 Oct 28	Week 11 Nov 4	Week 12 Nov 11	Week 13 Nov 18	Week 14 Nov 25	Week 15 Dec 2	Week 16 Dec 9	Final Dec 16	
		None	Dropped: No. 13 Michigan; No. 21 UC Irvine; No. 24 James Madison	Dropped: No. 6 Michigan State; No. 12 Akron; No. 14 Denver; No. 18 Loyola (IL); No. 23 Air Force; No. 24 West Virginia; No. 25 Portland	Dropped: No. 18 Michigan; No. 21 Maryland; No. 24 NC State; No. 25 UC Berkeley	Dropped: No. 12 Florida Gulf Coast; No. 19 UCLA; No. 22 CSUN	Dropped: No. 11 Xavier; No. 12 North Carolina; No. 20 Notre Dame; No. 21 Duke; No. 25 Rutgers	Dropped: No. 22 Loyola Marymount; No. 25 Saint Mary's	Dropped: No. 17 James Madison; No. 21 Penn State; No. 24 UTRGV; No. 25 Cal State Fullerton	Dropped: No. 18 North Carolina; No. 24 Navy	Dropped: No. 19 San Diego	Dropped: No. 17 FIU	Dropped: No. 17 NC State	Dropped: No. 23 Kentucky; No. 24 Louisville; No. 25 Syracuse	Dropped: No. 21 Loyola-Chicago; No. 23 Notre Dame	None	None	None	

== Soccer America ==
	Preseason Aug. 28	Week 2 Sep. 3	Week 3 Sep. 10	Week 4 Sep. 17	Week 5 Sep. 24	Week 6 Oct. 1	Week 7 Oct. 8	Week 8 Oct. 15	Week 9 Oct. 22	Week 10 Oct. 29	Week 11 Nov. 5	Week 12 Nov. 12	Final Nov. 19	
1.	North Carolina	Stanford (2–0–0)	Stanford (2–0–0)	Stanford (5–0–0)	Stanford (6–0–0)	Virginia (8–0–0)	Virginia (10–0–0)	Virginia (10–0–1)	Washington (12–1–0)	Washington (14–1–0)	Washington (14–1–1)	Virginia (15–1–1)	Virginia (17–1–1)	1.
2.	Akron	Saint Mary's (2–0–0)	Saint Mary's (4–0–0)	Saint Mary's (5–0–0)	Saint Mary's (7–0–0)	Stanford (7–0–1)	Washington (10–1–0)	Washington (11–1–0)	Stanford (9–1–2)	Stanford (10–1–2)	Stanford (12–1–2)	Stanford (13–1–3)	Clemson (16–2–1)	2.
3.	Saint Mary's	Wake Forest (2–0–0)	Wake Forest (3–0–0)	Wake Forest (5–0–0)	Virginia (6–0–0)	SMU (8–0–0)	SMU (9–0–1)	SMU (10–0–1)	Virginia (11–1–1)	Virginia (13–1–1)	Virginia (14–1–1)	Saint Mary's (15–1–0)	St. Mary's (16–1–0)	3.
4.	Stanford	Kentucky (1–0–0)	Virginia (3–0–0)	Virginia (4–0–0)	Georgetown (6–0–0)	Wake Forest (8–1–0)	Stanford (7–1–2)	Stanford (9–1–2)	Wake Forest (12–2–0)	Saint Mary's (12–1–0)	Saint Mary's (14–1–0)	UCF (13–1–2)	Washington (15–3–0)	4.
5.	Wake Forest	Virginia (2–0–0)	Duke (4–0–0)	Georgetown (5–0–0)	North Carolina (4–1–2)	Washington (8–1–0)	Saint Mary's (9–1–0)	Saint Mary's (10–1–0)	Saint Mary's (11–1–1)	UCF (10–1–2)	UCF (12–1–2)	Clemson (15–1–1)	SMU (16–1–1)	5.
6.	Kentucky	Duke (2–0–0)	Georgetown (4–0–0)	North Carolina (3–1–1)	Indiana (4–0–2)	UCF (6–1–1)	Charlotte (8–0–2)	UCF (8–1–2)	UCF (9–1–2)	Clemson (13–1–1)	Clemson (14–1–1)	Washington (14–3–0)	Georgetown (15–1–3)	6.
7.	Maryland	Indiana (2–0–0)	Washington (4–0–0)	Indiana (3–0–1)	UCF (5–1–1)	Saint Mary's (8–1–0)	UCF (7–1–2)	Wake Forest (10–2–0)	St. John's (12–1–0)	Georgetown (13–1–1)	Georgetown (14–1–1)	SMU (14–1–1)	Stanford (13–2–3)	7.
8.	Duke	Georgetown (2–0–0)	North Carolina (1–1–1)	Duke (4–1–0)	SMU (7–0–0)	Charlotte (6–0–2)	Kentucky (6–1–2)	Charlotte (8–0–3)	Clemson (11–1–1)	SMU (12–1–1)	SMU (13–1–1)	Georgetown (14–1–2)	UCF (14–2–2)	8.
9.	Virginia	UCF (1–1–0)	Virginia Tech (4–0–0)	UCF (3–1–1)	St. John's (7–0–0)	Kentucky (5–1–2)	Wake Forest (8–2–0)	St. John's (11–1–0)	Georgetown (11–1–1)	New Hampshire (12–0–2)	Missouri State (15–0–0)	Missouri State (16–0–0)	Indiana (14–2–4)	9.
10.	Indiana	North Carolina (0–1–1)	Louisville (2–0–1)	SMU (6–0–0)	Washington (7–1–0)	FIU (7–0–2)	Indiana (7–1–2)	Clemson (10–1–1)	SMU (10–1–1)	Missouri State (13–0–0)	Indiana (12–2–3)	Indiana (13–2–3)	Marshall (15–2–3)	10.
11.	Georgetown	Virginia Tech (2–0–0)	Indiana (3–0–1)	St. John's (6–0–0)	Clemson (7–0–0)	Duke (–3–0)	St. John's (9–1–0)	Indiana (8–1–3)	Charlotte (8–1–4)	Indiana (10–2–3)	Wake Forest (13–3–1)	Penn State (12–2–3)	UC Davis (13–4–2)	11.
12.	James Madison	Washington (2–0–0)	UCF (2–1–1)	Virginia Tech (4–1–0)	Wake Forest (6–1–0)	Cal State Fullerton (8–0–1)	NC State (6–2–1)	FIU (9–0–3)	New Hampshire (10–0–2)	Kentucky (9–2–3)	St. John's (13–2–1)	Wake Forest (13–3–2)	Wake Forest (13–4–2)	12.
13.	UCF	Maryland (1–1–0)	Charlotte (3–0–0)	Washington (5–1–0)	Cal State Fullerton (7–0–0)	Indiana (5–1–2)	Clemson (9–1–1)	New Hampshire (9–0–2)	Missouri State (12–0–0)	Wake Forest (12–3–1)	Penn State (11–2–3)	Marshall (13–2–3)	Missouri State (17–0–1)	13.
14.	Virginia Tech	Charlotte (2–0–0)	Xavier (3–0–0)	Maryland (3–2–0)	Charlotte (4–0–2)	St. John's (8–1–0)	North Carolina (6–2–2)	Missouri State (11–0–0)	Indiana (8–2–3)	St. John's (12–2–1)	Charlotte (10–2–4)	Charlotte (10–2–4)	New Hampshire (14–1–3)	14.
15.	Michigan State	Xavier (2–0–0)	Kentucky (2–1–0)	Clemson (5–0–0)	Kentucky (3–1–2)	Clemson (8–1–0)	FIU (7–0–3)	Georgetown (9–1–1)	Kentucky (8–2–3)	FIU (9–0–5)	Marshall (12–2–3)	UC Santa Barbara (12–3–4)	James Madison (11–6–3)	15.
16.	Louisville	Michigan State (0–0–2)	SMU (3–0–0)	Cal State Fullerton (6–0–0)	FIU (5–0–2)	James Madison (7–2–0)	Duke (6–3–1)	UC Santa Barbara (9–2–2)	FIU (9–0–4)	Penn State (9–2–3)	UC Santa Barbara (11–3–4)	UC Davis (12–4–2)	Rhode Island (14–3–3)	16.
17.	Michigan	Coastal Carolina (2–0–0)	St. John's (3–0–0)	Charlotte (3–0–2)	Louisville (3–1–2)	NC State (7–2–1)	New Hampshire (8–0–2)	NC State (7–3–1)	Penn State (8–2–2)	Maryland (9–4–2)	UC Davis (11–4–3)	Kentucky (11–3–3)	Kentucky (12–4–3)	17.
18.	Washington	Akron (0–2–0)	Florida Gulf Coast (3–0–1)	Kentucky (2–1–2)	James Madison (5–2–0)	Louisville (4–2–2)	Missouri State (9–0–0)	Kentucky (6–2–3)	Maryland (7–4–2)	Charlotte (9–2–4)	Kentucky (10–3–3)	Michigan (10–4–4)	Michigan (11–4–5)	18.
19.	Denver	Louisville (0–0–1)	Notre Dame (3–0–0)	Notre Dame (3–1–0)	Virginia Tech (5–2–0)	Georgetown (7–1–0)	Navy (11–0–0)	Navy (11–0–1)	Marshall (10–1–2)	NC State (8–3–3)	Michigan (9–4–4)	St. John's (13–3–1)	Penn State (12–3–3)	19.
20.	Charlotte	FIU (2–0–0)	UCLA (2–1–0)	UCLA (3–2–0)	Duke (4–3–0)	North Carolina (4–2–2)	James Madison (8–2–1)	Boston College (7–2–3)	UC Santa Barbara (10–3–2)	Pittsburgh (8–5–2)	New Hampshire (12–1–2)	UNC Wilmington (12–4–2)	Charlotte (10–3–4)	20.
21.	Oregon State	SMU (2–0–0)	Maryland (1–2–0)	CSUN (4–1–1)	Loyola Marymount (5–1–1)	New Hampshire (7–0–2)	Georgetown (7–1–1)	Penn State (6–2–2)	NC State (7–3–3)	UC Santa Barbara (10–3–4)	FIU (9–1–5)	Maryland (10–6–2)	UC Santa Barbara (12–4–4)	21.
22.	Portland	St. John's (2–0–0)	Clemson	Loyola Marymount (5–1–0)	New Hampshire (5–0–2)	Missouri State (7–0–0)	Maryland (6–3–1)	Maryland (6–3–2)	Navy (11–1–1)	Marshall (10–2–3)	UNC Wilmington (11–4–2)	New Hampshire (12–1–3)	St. John's (13–4–1)	22.
23.	UC Irvine	Florida Gulf Coast (1–0–1)	Cal State Fullerton (4–0–0)	FIU (4–0–1)	Missouri State (6–0–0)	Navy (9–0–0)	Louisville (5–3–2)	North Carolina (7–3–2)	Pittsburgh (7–5–2)	UC Davis (10–4–2)	Oral Roberts (13–2–0)	Pittsburgh (9–6–2)	Yale (13–2–2)	23.
24.	Lipscomb	Notre Dame (1–0–0)	Coastal Carolina (2–1–0)	Louisville (2–1–2)	Navy (7–0–0)	UC Santa Barbara (6–2–1)	UC Santa Barbara (7–2–2)	San Diego (9–1–1)	Louisville (7–4–2)	Michigan (7–4–4)	Maryland (9–6–2)	James Madison (10–6–3)	Campbell (16–2–2)	24.
25.	NC State	Michigan (1–1–0)	FIU (3–0–1)	Xavier (3–1–1)	UC Riverside (5–1–2)	Virginia Tech (5–2–1)	South Florida (6–2–0)	Marshall (8–1–2)	Memphis (9–3–3)	Louisville (8–5–2)	NC State (8–5–3)	Rhode Island (13–3–2)	Maryland (10–7–2)	25.
	Preseason Aug. 28	Week 2 Sep. 3	Week 3 Sep. 10	Week 4 Sep. 17	Week 5 Sep. 24	Week 6 Oct. 1	Week 7 Oct. 8	Week 8 Oct. 15	Week 9 Oct. 22	Week 10 Oct. 29	Week 11 Nov. 5	Week 12 Nov. 12	Final Nov. 19	
		Dropped: No. 12 James Madison; No. 19 Denver; No. 21 Oregon State; No. 22 Portland; No. 23 UC Irvine; No. 24 Lipscomb; No. 25 NC State	Dropped: No. 16 Michigan State; No. 18 Akron; No. 25 Michigan	Dropped: No. 18 Florida Gulf Coast; No. 24 Coastal Carolina	Dropped: No. 14 Maryland; No. 19 Notre Dame; No. 20 UCLA; No. 21 CSUN; No. 25 Xavier	Dropped: No. 21 Loyola Marymount; No. 25 UC Riverside	Dropped: No. 12 Cal State Fullerton; No. 25 Virginia Tech	Dropped: No. 16 Duke; No. 20 James Madison; No. 23 Louisville; No. 25 South Florida	Dropped: No. 20 Boston College; No. 23 North Carolina; No. 24 San Diego	Dropped: No. 22 Navy; No. 25 Memphis	Dropped: No. 20 Pittsburgh; No. 25 Louisville	Dropped: No. 21 FIU; No. 23 Oral Roberts; No. 25 NC State	Dropped: No. 20 UNC Wilmington; No. 23 Pittsburgh	

== College Soccer News ==
	Preseason Aug 6	Week 2 Sept 1	Week 3 Sept 8	Week 4 Sept 15	Week 5 Sept 22	Week 6 Sept 29	Week 7 Oct 6	Week 8 Oct 13	Week 9 Oct 20	Week 10 Oct 27	Week 11 Nov 3	Week 12 Nov 11	Week 13 Nov 17	Final Dec 9	
1.	Wake Forest	Wake Forest (2–0–0)	Wake Forest (3–0–0)	Wake Forest (4–0–0)	Stanford (6–0–0)	Virginia (8–0–0)	Virginia (10–0–0)	Virginia (10–0–1)	Washington (12–1–0)	Washington (14–1–0)	Washington (14–1–0)	Virginia (15–1–1)	Virginia (17–1–1)	Georgetown (20–1–3)	1.
2.	Kentucky	Kentucky (2–0–0)	Stanford (2–0–0)	Stanford (5–0–0)	Virginia (6–0–0)	Stanford (7–0–1)	SMU (9–0–1)	SMU (10–0–1)	Virginia (11–1–1)	Virginia (13–1–1)	Virginia (14–1–1)	Clemson (15–1–1)	Georgetown (15–1–3)	Virginia (21–2–1)	2.
3.	Akron	Maryland (1–0–0)	Saint Mary's (3–0–0)	Saint Mary's (5–0–0)	Saint Mary's (7–0–0)	Wake Forest (8–1–0)	Washington (10–1–0)	Washington (11–1–0)	Wake Forest (12–2–0)	Clemson (13–1–1)	Clemson (14–1–1)	Georgetown (14–1–2)	SMU (16–1–1)	Stanford (14–3–5)	3.
4.	Maryland	Stanford (1–0–0)	Duke (4–0–0)	Virginia (4–0–0)	Wake Forest (6–1–0)	SMU (8–0–0)	Clemson (9–1–1)	Clemson (10–1–1)	Clemson (11–1–1)	Georgetown (13–1–1)	Georgetown (14–1–1)	Stanford (13–1–3)	Clemson (16–2–1)	Wake Forest (16–5–2)	4.
5.	Stanford	Saint Mary's (1–0–0)	Indiana (3–0–1)	Indiana (3–0–1)	Indiana (4–0–2)	Washington (8–1–0)	Stanford (7–1–2)	Stanford (9–1–2)	Stanford (9–1–2)	Stanford (10–1–2)	Stanford (12–1–2)	SMU (14–1–1)	St. Mary's (16–1–0)	SMU (18–2–1)	5.
6.	Saint Mary's	Duke (2–0–0)	Georgetown (3–0–0)	Georgetown (5–0–0)	Georgetown (6–0–0)	Clemson (8–1–0)	Georgetown (7–1–1)	Georgetown (9–1–1)	SMU (10–1–1)	SMU (12–1–1)	SMU (13–1–1)	Saint Mary's (15–1–0)	Washington (15–3–0)	Clemson (18–2–2)	6.
7.	North Carolina	Indiana (1–0–0)	Virginia (3–0–0)	Clemson (5–0–0)	Clemson (7–0–0)	Georgetown (7–1–0)	Wake Forest (8–2–0)	Wake Forest (10–2–0)	Georgetown (11–1–1)	Wake Forest (12–3–1)	Wake Forest (13–3–1)	Wake Forest (13–3–2)	Indiana (14–2–4)	Washington (17–4–0)	7.
8.	Duke	Georgetown (1–0–0)	Virginia Tech (4–0–0)	Duke (4–1–0)	SMU (7–0–0)	Saint Mary's (8–1–0)	Saint Mary's (9–1–0)	Saint Mary's (10–1–0)	Saint Mary's (11–1–0)	Saint Mary's (12–1–0)	Saint Mary's (14–1–0)	UCF (13–1–2)	UCF (14–2–2)	UC Santa Barbara (15–5–4)	8.
9.	Indiana	Akron (0–0–1)	Notre Dame (3–0–0)	North Carolina (3–1–1)	North Carolina (4–1–2)	Charlotte (6–0–2)	Charlotte (8–0–2)	St. John's (11–1–0)	St. John's (12–1–0)	UCF (10–1–2)	UCF (12–1–2)	Washington (14–3–0)	Stanford (13–2–3)	Indiana (15–3–4)	9.
10.	Michigan State	North Carolina (0–1–1)	Washington (4–0–0)	Virginia Tech (4–1–0)	Washington (7–1–0)	Indiana (5–1–2)	Indiana (7–1–2)	Charlotte (8–0–3)	UCF (9–1–2)	St. John's (12–2–1)	St. John's (13–2–1)	Indiana (13–2–3)	Marshall (15–2–3)	UCF (15–3–2)	10.
11.	James Madison	Michigan State (0–0–1)	North Carolina (1–1–1)	Notre Dame (3–1–0)	Charlotte (4–0–2)	UCF (6–1–1)	UCF (7–1–2)	Indiana (8–1–3)	FIU (9–0–4)	Indiana (10–2–3)	Indiana (12–2–3)	Missouri State (16–0–0)	Missouri State (17–0–1)	Missouri State (18–1–1)	11.
12.	Georgetown	Virginia (1–0–0)	Louisville (2–0–1)	Washington (5–1–0)	UCF (5–1–1)	Cal State Fullerton (8–0–1)	St. John's (9–1–0)	UCF (8–1–2)	Indiana (8–2–3)	FIU (9–0–5)	Missouri State (15–0–0)	Penn State (12–2–3)	Wake Forest (13–4–2)	Marshall (16–3–3)	12.
13.	Virginia	Virginia Tech (2–0–0)	Kentucky (2–1–0)	Charlotte (3–0–2)	St. John's (7–0–0)	New Hampshire (7–0–2)	New Hampshire (8–0–2)	FIU (9–0–3)	Charlotte (8–1–3)	New Hampshire (12–0–2)	Penn State (11–2–3)	St. John's (13–3–1)	New Hampshire (14–1–3)	Saint Mary's (16–2–0)	13.
14.	Notre Dame	Notre Dame (1–0–0)	Maryland (1–2–0)	Maryland (2–2–0)	Cal State Fullerton (7–0–0)	St. John's (8–1–0)	Navy (11–0–0)	New Hampshire (9–0–2)	New Hampshire (10–0–2)	Missouri State (13–0–0)	Marshall (12–2–3)	Marshall (13–3–3)	Penn State (12–3–3)	Michigan (11–5–6)	14.
15.	Louisville	Louisville (0–0–1)	Charlotte (3–0–0)	SMU (5–0–0)	Louisville (3–1–2)	Louisville (4–2–2)	Kentucky (6–1–2)	Navy (11–0–1)	Missouri State (12–0–0)	Maryland (9–4–2)	New Hampshire (12–1–2)	New Hampshire (12–1–3)	Michigan (11–4–5)	Providence (16–7–0)	15.
16.	Michigan	Coastal Carolina (2–0–0)	Coastal Carolina (2–1–0)	Cal State Fullerton (6–0–0)	Virginia Tech (5–2–0)	Kentucky (5–1–2)	North Carolina (6–2–2)	Missouri State (11–0–0)	Marshall (10–1–2)	Kentucky (9–2–3)	FIU (9–1–5)	UC Santa Barbara (12–3–4)	Seattle (14–3–4)	Seattle (15–3–5)	16.
17.	Denver	UCF (1–1–0)	Xavier (3–0–0)	Xavier (3–1–1)	Notre Dame (3–2–1)	North Carolina (4–2–2)	FIU (7–0–3)	UC Santa Barbara (9–2–2)	UC Santa Barbara (10–3–2)	Marshall (10–2–3)	UC Santa Barbara (11–3–4)	Kentucky (11–3–3)	UC Davis (13–4–2)	Virginia Tech (10–6–3)	17.
18.	UCF	Michigan (0–1–0)	SMU (3–0–0)	UCF (3–1–1)	Kentucky (3–1–2)	FIU (7–0–2)	James Madison (8–2–1)	Maryland (6–3–2)	Kentucky (8–2–3)	UC Santa Barbara (10–3–4)	Kentucky (10–3–3)	Charlotte (10–2–4)	Charlotte (11–3–4)	Louisville (10–8–2)	18.
19.	Virginia Tech	West Virginia (1–0–0)	UCF (2–1–1)	Louisville (2–1–1)	New Hampshire (5–0–2)	Navy (9–0–0)	Maryland (6–3–1)	James Madison (9–3–1)	Maryland (7–4–2)	Penn State (9–2–3)	Charlotte (10–2–4)	Seattle (13–3–3)	Kentucky (12–4–3)	St. John's (14–5–1)	19.
20.	West Virginia	SMU (1–0–0)	Clemson (3–0–0)	Kentucky (2–1–2)	Navy (7–0–0)	Virginia Tech (5–2–1)	Virginia Tech (6–2–2)	San Diego (9–1–1)	San Diego (10–2–1)	Charlotte (9–2–4)	Seattle (12–3–3)	Maryland (10–6–2)	St John's (13–4–1)	Penn State (12–4–3)	20.
21.	Oregon State	Charlotte (1–0–0)	Florida Gulf Coast (3–0–1)	St. John's (5–0–0)	FIU (5–0–2)	James Madison (7–2–0)	Missouri State (9–0–0)	Kentucky (6–2–3)	Yale (9–0–2)	San Diego (10–3–1)	Maryland (9–6–2)	FIU (9–2–5)	Yale (13–2–2)	Kentucky (13–5–3)	21.
22.	SMU	Oregon State (1–1–0)	UCLA (2–1–0)	UCLA (3–2–0)	James Madison (5–2–0)	Notre Dame (4–3–1)	Cal State Fullerton (8–2–1)	North Carolina (7–3–2)	Navy (11–1–1)	Seattle (10–3–3)	Yale (11–2–2)	Yale (12–2–2)	UC Santa Barbara (12–4–4)	New Hampshire (15–2–3)	22.
23.	Charlotte	Washington (1–0–0)	Oregon State (2–1–0)	CSUN (4–1–1)	Duke (4–3–0)	Duke (5–3–0)	Duke (6–3–1)	Yale (7–0–2)	NC State (7–3–3)	NC State (8–4–3)	Rhode Island (12–3–2)	Rhode Island (13–3–2)	Rhode Island (14–3–3)	Charlotte (12–4–4)	23.
24.	Portland	Denver (0–0–1)	Creighton (1–1–1)	West Virginia (3–1–1)	Coastal Carolina (4–2–0)	Maryland (4–3–1)	Louisville (5–3–2)	Virginia Tech (6–3–2)	Virginia Tech (7–3–2)	Virginia Tech (7–4–2)	Oral Roberts (13–2–0)	UNC Wilmington (12–4–2)	James Madison (11–6–3)	UC Davis (13–5–2)	24.
25.	NC State	UConn (1–0–0)	West Virginia (2–1–0)	New Hampshire (3–0–2)	Maryland (3–3–0)	Missouri State (7–0–0)	San Diego (8–1–1)	Marshall (8–1–2)	North Carolina (7–4–2)	Yale (9–2–2)	UNC Wilmington (11–4–2)	Michigan (10–4–4)	Providence (14–6–0)	Campbell (17–3–2)	25.
26.	UConn	Xavier (1–0–0)	Michigan (2–2–0)	FIU (4–0–1)	Rutgers (5–0–2)	West Virginia (6–2–1)	NC State (6–2–1)	Boston College (7–2–3)	James Madison (9–5–1)	James Madison (10–5–2)	Michigan (9–4–4)	Virginia Tech (9–5–3)	Campbell (16–2–2)	Maryland (11–8–2)	26.
27.	UC Irvine	UC Irvine (0–1–1)	CSUN (2–0–1)	Coastal Carolina (2–2–0)	Missouri State (6–0–0)	San Diego (7–1–0)	UC Santa Barbara (7–2–2)	Rutgers (7–3–2)	Penn State (8–2–2)	Rhode Island (11–3–2)	James Madison (10–6–2)	UC Davis (12–4–2)	Virginia Tech (9–5–3)	Boston College (9–6–3)	27.
28.	Washington	Clemson (1–0–0)	New Hampshire (2–0–2)	Rutgers (5–0–0)	Yale (4–0–2)	Yale (4–2–0)	Yale (6–0–2)	NC State (7–3–1)	Memphis (9–3–0)	Memphis (10–4–2)	Memphis (10–5–0)	James Madison (10–6–3)	Maryland (10–7–2)	Yale (13–3–2)	28.
29.	Colgate	New Hampshire (1–0–0)	UConn (2–1–0)	Navy (5–0–0)	West Virginia (4–2–0)	Rutgers (6–1–2)	Michigan (5–2–3)	Notre Dame (7–4–1)	Louisville (7–4–2)	Louisville (8–5–2)	UC Davis (11–4–2)	Campbell (14–2–2)	FIU (10–3–5)	Pittsburgh (10–8–2)	29.
30.	New Hampshire	Florida Gulf Coast (1–0–0)	St. John's (3–0–0)	NC State (3–1–1)	San Diego (6–1–0)	NC State (5–2–1)	Marshall (8–1–1)	Duke (6–4–1)	Boston College (7–3–3)	Oral Roberts (12–2–0)	Campbell (14–2–2)	Oral Roberts (13–3–0)	Loyola Marymount (11–5–3); UNC Wilmington (12–5–2)	Coastal Carolina (10–8–3)	30.
	Preseason Aug 6	Week 2 Sept 1	Week 3 Sept 8	Week 4 Sept 15	Week 5 Sept 22	Week 6 Sept 29	Week 7 Oct 6	Week 8 Oct 13	Week 9 Oct 20	Week 10 Oct 27	Week 11 Nov 3	Week 12 Nov 11	Week 13 Nov 17	Final Dec 9	
		Dropped: No. 11 James Madison; No. 24 Portland; No. 25 NC State; No. 29 Colgate	Dropped: No. 9 Akron; No. 11 Michigan State; No. 24 Denver; No. 27 UC Irvine	Dropped: No. 21 Florida Gulf Coast; No. 23 Oregon State; No. 24 Creighton; No. 26 Michigan; No. 29 UConn	Dropped: No. 22 UCLA; No. 23 CSUN; No. 30 NC State	Dropped: No. 24 Coastal Carolina	Dropped: No. 22 Notre Dame; No. 26 West Virginia; No. 29 Rutgers	Dropped: No. 22 Cal State Fullerton; No. 24 Louisville; No. 29 Michigan	Dropped: No. 27 Rutgers; No. 29 Notre Dame; No. 30 Duke	Dropped: No. 22 Navy; No. 25 North Carolina; No. 30 Boston College	Dropped: No. 21 San Diego; No. 23 NC State; No. 24 Virginia Tech; No. 29 Louisville	Dropped: No. 28 Memphis	Dropped: No. 30 Oral Roberts	Dropped: No. 24 James Madison; No. 25 Providence; No. 29 FIU; No. 30 Loyola Marymount; No. 30 UNC Wilmington	
