= 2019 Big Ten men's soccer tournament =

- Classification: Division I
- Teams: 9
- Matches: 8
- First round site: Top Seed Campus Site
- Quarterfinals site: Higher seeds
- Semifinals site: Ludwig Field; College Park, MD
- Finals site: Ludwig Field; College Park, MD
- Champions: Indiana (14th title)
- Winning coach: Todd Yeagley (3rd title)
- MVP: Jack Maher (Indiana)
- Broadcast: BTN

2019 Big Ten Conference men's soccer standings
	Conf.					Overall
Team	W		L		T	W		L		T
No. 9 Indiana ‡	7	–	1	–	0	15	–	3	–	4
No. 18 Penn State +	6	–	1	–	1	12	–	4	–	3
No. 17 Michigan +	4	–	1	–	3	11	–	5	–	6
Maryland +	3	–	3	–	2	11	–	8	–	2
Northwestern	3	–	3	–	2	8	–	8	–	2
Michigan State	3	–	4	–	1	3	–	12	–	3
Wisconsin	1	–	4	–	3	3	–	11	–	4
Rutgers	1	–	6	–	1	7	–	8	–	3
Ohio State	1	–	6	–	1	7	–	11	–	1
‡ – 2019 B1G Tournament champion + – Invited to the 2019 NCAA tournament; As of 17 December 2019; Rankings from United Soccer Coaches; Source: Big Ten

The 2019 Big Ten Conference men's soccer tournament was the 29th edition of the tournament. It determined the Big Ten Conference's automatic berth into the 2019 NCAA Division I men's soccer tournament. Maryland hosted the semifinal and final rounds of the tournament.

Defending champions, Indiana, successfully defended their title, giving the program their 13th Big Ten Tournament championship. They defeated Michigan in the final in a penalty shoot-out.

== Seeding ==
Seeding was determined by regular season conference records.

Seed	School	Conference record								Tiebreaker
Seed	School	Pld.	W	L	T	GF	GA	GD	Pts.	Tiebreaker
1	Indiana	8	7	1	0	19	7	+12	21	
2	Penn State	8	6	1	1	16	10	+6	19	
3	Michigan	8	4	1	3	13	5	+8	15	
4	Northwestern	8	3	3	2	9	10	−1	11	NU 1−0 vs. UMD
5	Maryland	8	3	3	2	14	12	+2	11	UMD 0−1 vs. NU
6	Michigan State	8	3	4	1	9	10	−1	10	
7	Wisconsin	8	1	4	3	5	11	−6	6	
8	Ohio State	8	1	6	1	4	15	−11	4	OSU 1−0 vs. RUT
9	Rutgers	8	1	6	1	6	15	−9	4	RUT 0−1 vs. OSU

== Bracket ==
First Round; November 9
8	Ohio State	1
9	Rutgers	0

Quarterfinals; November 10
1	Indiana	2
8	Ohio State	0
4	Northwestern	0
5	Maryland	1
3	Michigan	2
6	Michigan State	1
2	Penn State	3
7	Wisconsin	0

Semifinals; November 15
1	Indiana	1
5	Maryland	0
3	Michigan	1
2	Penn State	0

Championship; November 17
1	Indiana (p)	0 (4)
3	Michigan	0 (3)

== Results ==
=== First round ===
November 9
1:00 p.m.

No. 8 Ohio State	1–0	No. 9 Rutgers
Etling 65'	Report

Bill Armstrong Stadium, Bloomington
Attendance: 45
Referee: Jason White

=== Quarterfinals ===
November 10
1:00 p.m.

No. 1 Indiana	2–0	No. 8 Ohio State
Penn 42'; Palzzolo 85'	Report

Bill Armstrong Stadium, Bloomington
Attendance: 1,384
Referee: Mark Kadlecik

November 10
1:00 p.m.

No. 2 Penn State	3–0	No. 7 Wisconsin
Sload 58'; Butts 62'; Dabora 85'	Report

Jeffrey Field, State College
Attendance: 678
Referee: Art Arustamyan

November 10
2:00 p.m.

No. 4 Northwestern	0–1	No. 5 Maryland
	Report	Crognale 71'

Martin Stadium, Evanston

November 10
4:00 p.m.

No. 3 Michigan	2–1	No. 6 Michigan State
Broche 60'; Hallahan 71'	Report	Ferri 21'

U-M Soccer Stadium, Ann Arbor
Attendance: 979
Referee: Nikola Aleksic

=== Semifinals ===
November 15
4:00 p.m.

No. 2 Penn State	0–1	No. 3 Michigan
	Report	Hallahan 62'

Ludwig Field, College Park
Attendance: 1,660
Referee: Sergio Gonzalez

November 15
7:00 p.m.

No. 1 Indiana	1–0 (a.e.t.)	No. 5 Maryland
Maher 103' (pen.)	Report

Ludwig Field, College Park
Attendance: 1,660
Referee: Sorin Stoica

=== B1G Championship ===
November 17
2:00 p.m.

No. 1 Indiana	0–0 (a.e.t.)	No. 3 Michigan
	Report
Penalties
Schmidt (penalty scored); Palazzolo (penalty scored); Warr (penalty scored); Maher (penalty missed); Penn (penalty scored)	4–3	(penalty missed) Ragen; (penalty scored) Broche; (penalty scored) Popović; (penalty missed) Buca; (penalty scored) Ybarra

Ludwig Field, College Park
Attendance: 320
Referee: Calin Radosav

== All-Tournament team ==
- Tournament Offensive MVP: Jack Hallahan
- Tournament Defensive MVP: Jack Maher

All-Tournament team:

- Spencer Glass, Indiana
- Jack Maher, Indiana
- Aidan Morris, Indiana
- Niklas Neumann, Maryland
- Jack Hallahan, Michigan
- Abdou Samake, Michigan

- Patrick Nielsen, Michigan State
- Matt Moderwell, Northwestern
- Joe Ortiz, Ohio State
- Aaron Molloy, Penn State
- Zach Klancnik, Wisconsin
