= 2019 Big Ten Conference men's soccer season =

- League: NCAA Division I
- Sport: Soccer
- Duration: August 30, 2019 – November 3, 2019
- Teams: 9

2020 MLS SuperDraft
- Top draft pick: Jack Maher, 2nd overall
- Picked by: Nashville SC

Regular Season
- Season champions: Indiana
- Runners-up: Penn State
- Season MVP: O: Nebojša Popović; M: Jack Maher; D: Aaron Molloy; G: Andrew Verdi
- Top scorer: Nebojša Popović

Tournament
- Champions: Indiana
- Runners-up: Michigan
- Finals MVP: O: Jack Hallahan; D: Jack Maher

Big Ten Conference men's soccer seasons
- ← 2018 2020 →

2019 Big Ten Conference men's soccer standings
	Conf.					Overall
Team	W		L		T	W		L		T
No. 9 Indiana ‡	7	–	1	–	0	15	–	3	–	4
No. 18 Penn State +	6	–	1	–	1	12	–	4	–	3
No. 17 Michigan +	4	–	1	–	3	11	–	5	–	6
Maryland +	3	–	3	–	2	11	–	8	–	2
Northwestern	3	–	3	–	2	8	–	8	–	2
Michigan State	3	–	4	–	1	3	–	12	–	3
Wisconsin	1	–	4	–	3	3	–	11	–	4
Rutgers	1	–	6	–	1	7	–	8	–	3
Ohio State	1	–	6	–	1	7	–	11	–	1
‡ – 2019 B1G Tournament champion + – Invited to the 2019 NCAA tournament; As of 17 December 2019; Rankings from United Soccer Coaches; Source: Big Ten

The 2019 Big Ten Conference men's soccer season was the 29th season of men's varsity soccer in the conference. The regular season began on August 30, 2019, and concluded on November 3, 2019. The season culminated with the 2019 Big Ten Conference Men's Soccer Tournament to determine the conference's automatic berth into the 2019 NCAA Division I Men's Soccer Tournament. The tournament began on November 10, 2019, and concluded on November 17, 2019.

Indiana finished the season as the Big Ten Champions. Maryland enters the season as the defending NCAA Tournament champions. Indiana went on to win the Big Ten regular season and tournament.

== Background ==
=== Previous season ===
The previous season was the 28th season of men's varsity soccer in the conference. The 2018 Big Ten regular season began on August 24, 2018, and concluded on October 28, 2018. The season culminated with the 2018 Big Ten Conference Men's Soccer Tournament to determine the conference's automatic berth into the 2018 NCAA Division I Men's Soccer Tournament. Indiana went on to win both the regular season and the tournament, winning all eight of their Big Ten Conference games. They defeated Michigan in the Big Ten Men's Soccer Championship Game.

With the Big Ten title, Indiana earned the conference's automatic berth into the 2018 NCAA Tournament, where Maryland, Michigan, and Michigan State joined as at-large berths. The conference had the strongest showing in the NCAA Tournament, where three of their four berths reached the College Cup (Final Four) of the tournament. Big Ten side, Maryland, would defeat Akron in the National Championship Game to win their fourth NCAA title, and their first since 2008.

Concluding the tournament, Indiana senior and captain, Andrew Gutman, won the TopDrawerSoccer.com National Player of the Year Award as well as the Missouri Athletic Club's Hermann Trophy. Gutman would forgo an opportunity to sign a homegrown contract with the Chicago Fire and signed with Celtic in Scotland. Indiana sophomore forward, Griffin Dorsey was the highest Big Ten player selected in the 2019 MLS SuperDraft, being drafted by Toronto FC ninth overall. Eleven other Big Ten players were selected in the MLS SuperDraft, the most of any collegiate conference, and an additional four signed homegrown player contracts with their parent MLS clubs.

=== Coaching changes ===
Dan Donigan, the former head coach of Rutgers was fired following the 2018 season and was replaced by Fordham head coach, Jim McElderry.

School	Outgoing coach	Manner of departure	Date of vacancy	Position in table	Incoming coach	Date of appointment
Rutgers	(United States) Dan Donigan	Fired	November 16, 2018	Preseason	(United States) Jim McElderry	December 8, 2018

== Head coaches ==
As of the 2018 season

Team	Head coach	Previous job	Years at school	Overall record	Record at school	Big Ten record	NCAA Tournaments	NCAA College Cups	NCAA Titles
Indiana	Todd Yeagley	Wisconsin	9	129–54–36 (.671)	122–45–34 (.692)	35–15–18 (.647)	10	3	1
Maryland	Sasho Cirovski	Hartford	26	412–156–60 (.704)	386–143–53 (.709)	24–9–7 (.688)	25	9	3
Michigan	Chaka Daley	Providence	7	151–165–48 (.481)	61–54–21 (.526)	23–20–9 (.529)	3	0	0
Michigan State	Damon Rensing	Michigan State (asst.)	10	117–66–30 (.620)	117–66–30 (.620)	31–26–13 (.536)	8	1	0
Northwestern	Tim Lenahan	Lafayette	18	295–209–72 (.575)	169–140–51 (.540)	36–60–20 (.397)	4	0	0
Ohio State	Brian Maisonneuve	Indiana (asst.)	2	1–15–2 (.111)	1–15–2 (.111)	0–7–1 (.063)	0	0	0
Penn State	Jeff Cook	Bethlehem Steel (asst.)	2	127–104–36 (.543)	6–9–2 (.412)	3–3–2 (.500)	9	0	0
Rutgers	Jim McElderry	Fordham	1	127–125–37 (.503)	0–0–0 (–)	0–0–0 (–)	3	0	0
Wisconsin	John Trask	UIC	10	129–96–55 (.559)	75–72–29 (.509)	26–28–10 (.484)	2	0	0

== Preseason ==
=== Preseason poll ===
The preseason poll was released on August 26, 2019.

	Team ranking
1.	Indiana
2.	Maryland
3.	Michigan
4.	Michigan State
5.	Wisconsin
6.	Penn State
7.	Northwestern
8.	Ohio State
9.	Rutgers

=== Preseason national polls ===
The preseason national polls will be released in July and August 2019.

	United; Soccer	CSN	Top Drawer; Soccer
Indiana	2	9	5
Maryland	1	4	1
Michigan	24	16	13
Michigan State	7	10	8
Northwestern	—	—	—
Ohio State	—	—	—
Penn State	—	—	—
Rutgers	—	—	—
Wisconsin	RV	RV	—

== Regular season ==
=== Early season tournaments ===
Early season tournaments will be announced in late Spring and Summer 2019.

Team	Tournament	Finish
Indiana	IU Credit Union Classic	1st
Indiana	Mike Berticelli Tournament	1st
Maryland	Audi Field Classic	2nd
Northwestern	IU Credit Union Classic	3rd
Northwestern	Chicago Classic	4th
Ohio State	Dayton Classic	1st
Ohio State	Wolstein Classic	3rd
Wisconsin	Chicago Classic	2nd

== Postseason ==
=== Big Ten Tournament ===
The Big Ten Tournament was played from November 9–17. Indiana won the tournament, defeating Michigan in the final.

Semifinals
1	Indiana	1
5	Maryland	0
2	Penn State	0
3	Michigan	1

Final
1	Indiana (pen.)	0 (4)
3	Michigan	0 (3)

=== NCAA Tournament ===
The NCAA Tournament will begin in November 2019 and conclude on December 17, 2019.

Seed	Region	School	1st Round	2nd Round	3rd Round	Quarterfinals	Semifinals	Championship
5	Winston-Salem	Indiana	BYE	W 3–0 vs. Kentucky – (Bloomington, IN)	L 0–1 (OT) vs. UCSB – (Bloomington, IN)			
13	Winston-Salem	Michigan	BYE	T 0–0 (5–4 PKs) vs. Wright State – (Ann Arbor, MI)	L 1–3 vs. Wake Forest – (Winston-Salem, NC)			
15	Greenville	Penn State	BYE	L 2–3 (OT) vs. Providence – (State College, PA)				
—N/a	Winston-Salem	Maryland	W 4–0 vs. Iona – (College Park, MD)	L 0–3 vs. Wake Forest – (Winston-Salem, NC)				
W–L–T (%):			1–0–0 (1.000)	1–2–1 (.375)	0–2–0 (.000)	0–0–0 (–)	0–0–0 (–)	0–0–0 (–) Total: 2–4–1 (.357)

== Rankings ==
=== National rankings ===
	Improvement in ranking
	Drop in ranking
RV	Received votes but were not ranked in Top 25
NV	No votes received

		Pre	Wk 1	Wk 2	Wk 3	Wk 4	Wk 5	Wk 6	Wk 7	Wk 8	Wk 9	Wk 10	Wk 11	Wk 12	Wk 13	Wk 14	Wk 15	Wk 16	Final
Indiana	USC	2	2	4	4	5	8	4	6	10	10	9	8	6	None released				9
Indiana	TDS	5	5	4	4	5	8	7	7	7	8	9	8	8	6	6	9	9	9
Maryland	USC	1	4	24	25	RV	RV	25	25	22	17	23	22	RV	None released				RV
Maryland	TDS	1	1	1	21	NV	NV	NV	13	15	7	6	14	14	16	20	20	20	20
Michigan	USC	24	RV	RV	NV	NV	NV	NV	NV	NV	NV	NV	RV	17	None released				17
Michigan	TDS	13	13	RV	18	NV	NV	NV	NV	NV	NV	NV	24	17	11	16	13	13	13
Michigan State	USC	7	16	RV	NV	NV	NV	NV	NV	NV	NV	NV	NV	NV	None released				NV
Michigan State	TDS	8	8	6	NV	NV	NV	NV	NV	NV	NV	NV	NV	NV	NV	NV	NV	NV	NV
Northwestern	USC	NV	NV	NV	NV	NV	NV	NV	NV	NV	NV	NV	NV	NV	None released				NV
Northwestern	TDS	NV	NV	NV	NV	NV	NV	NV	NV	NV	NV	NV	NV	NV	NV	NV	NV	NV	NV
Ohio State	USC	NV	NV	NV	RV	RV	RV	NV	NV	NV	NV	NV	NV	NV	None released				NV
Ohio State	TDS	NV	NV	NV	NV	NV	NV	NV	NV	NV	NV	NV	NV	NV	NV	NV	NV	NV	NV
Penn State	USC	NV	NV	NV	NV	RV	RV	NV	RV	19	16	13	12	13	None released				18
Penn State	TDS	NV	NV	NV	NV	NV	RV	20	22	RV	15	15	10	10	20	18	18	18	18
Rutgers	USC	NV	NV	RV	24	22	RV	NV	NV	NV	NV	NV	NV	NV	None released				NV
Rutgers	TDS	NV	NV	NV	NV	25	25	RV	NV	NV	NV	NV	NV	NV	NV	NV	NV	NV	NV
Wisconsin	USC	RV	NV	NV	NV	NV	NV	NV	NV	NV	NV	NV	NV	NV	None released				NV
Wisconsin	TDS	NV	NV	NV	NV	NV	NV	NV	NV	NV	NV	NV	NV	NV	NV	NV	NV	NV	NV

=== Regional rankings - USC North Region ===
	Improvement in ranking
	Drop in ranking
RV	Received votes but were not ranked in Top 10
NV	No votes received

The USC North Region compares teams across the Big Ten Conference, Horizon League, and Mid-American Conference.

	Wk 1	Wk 2	Wk 3	Wk 4	Wk 5	Wk 6	Wk 7	Wk 8	Wk 9	Wk 10	Wk 11	Wk 12
Indiana	2	1	1	1	1	1	1	1	1	1	1	1
Maryland	1	5	6	10	6	2	2	3	3	4	3	5
Michigan	NV	10	9	8	10	4	4	7	7	5	5	2
Michigan State	4	NV	NV	NV	NV	NV	NV	NV	NV	NV	NV	NV
Northwestern	7	NV	NV	9	5	NV	NV	NV	10	10	9	NV
Ohio State	NV	6	4	4	7	6	NV	NV	NV	NV	NV	NV
Penn State	NV	9	8	3	4	5	3	2	2	2	2	3
Rutgers	10	3	3	2	3	9	6	8	9	9	NV	NV
Wisconsin	9	NV	NV	NV	NV	NV	NV	NV	NV	NV	NV	NV

== Statistics ==
=== Goals ===
Rank	Player	College	Goals
1	(Serbia) Nebojša Popović	Michigan	10
2	(United States) Liam Butts	Penn State	8
2	(Republic of Ireland) Aaron Molloy	Penn State	8
4	(Spain) Pablo Ávila	Rutgers	6
5	(United States) Joshua Penn	Indiana	5
5	(United States) Devyn Etling	Ohio State	5
5	(United States) Jack Holland	Ohio State	5
5	(United States) Matt Moderwell	Northwestern	5
5	(United States) Derick Broche	Michigan	5
5	(United States) Eric Matzelevich	Maryland	5
5	(United States) Victor Bezerra	Indiana	5
5	(United States) Jackson Temple	Rutgers	5

=== Assists ===
Rank	Player	College	Assists
1	(United States) Marc Ybarra	Michigan	8
2	(United States) Jack Holland	Ohio State	7
3	(United States) Aidan Morris	Indiana	6
3	(United States) Matt Moderwell	Northwestern	6
3	(England) Jack Hallahan	Michigan	6
6	(United States) Eli Crognale	Maryland	5
6	(Republic of Ireland) Aaron Molloy	Penn State	5
6	(United States) Christian Sload	Penn State	5
9	(Canada) Malcolm Johnston	Maryland	4
9	(United States) Pierre Reedy	Penn State	4

=== Shutouts ===
Rank	Player	College	Shutouts
1	(United States) Roman Celentano	Indiana	3
1	(United States) Parker Siegfried	Ohio State	3
1	(Israel) Oren Asher	Rutgers	3
4	(United States) Sean Caulfield	Indiana	2
5	(Germany) Niklas Neumann	Maryland	1
5	(United States) Andrew Verdi	Michigan	1
5	(United States) Hunter Morse	Michigan State	1
5	(United States) Kris Shakes	Penn State	1
5	(Australia) Dean Cowdroy	Wisconsin	1

== Awards and honors ==
=== Player of the week honors ===
Week	Offensive			Defensive		
Week	Player	Position	Team	Player	Position	Team
Sep. 4	Jørgen Wisth Lie	FW	Rutgers	Jack Maher	MF	Indiana
Sep. 10	Joe Ortiz	FW	Ohio State	Sean Caulfield	DF	Indiana
Sep. 17	Devyn Etling	FW	Ohio State	Ben Di Rosa	DF	Maryland
Sep. 24	Nebojša Popović	FW	Michigan	Brandon Hackenberg	DF	Penn State
Oct. 1	Farai Mutatu	FW	Michigan State	Josh Levine	GK	Penn State
Oct. 8	Aidan Morris	FW	Indiana	Jackson Ragen	DF	Michigan
Oct. 15	Liam Butts	FW	Penn State	Roman Celentano	GK	Indiana
Oct. 22	Aaron Molloy	MF	Penn State	Johannes Bergmann	MF	Maryland
Oct. 29	Aidan Morris	FW	Indiana	Niklas Neumann	DF	Maryland
Nov. 5	Christian Sload	FW	Penn State	Jack Maher	MF	Indiana

=== Postseason honors ===
2019 Big Ten Men's Soccer Individual Awards
Award	Recipient(s)
Offensive Player of the Year	Nebojša Popović, Michigan*
Defensive Player of the Year	Aaron Molloy, Penn State*
Midfielder of the Year	Jack Maher, Indiana
Goalkeeper of the Year	Andrew Verdi, Michigan
Coach of the Year	Todd Yeagley, Indiana
Freshman of the Year	Aidan Morris, Indiana

2019 Big Ten Men's Soccer All-Conference Teams
First Team Honorees	Second Team Honorees	All-Freshman Team Honorees	Sportsmanship Award Honorees
Forward; Nebojsa Popovic, Michigan*; Liam Butts, Penn State; Midfield; Aidan Morris, Indiana; Eli Crognale, Maryland; Jack Hallahan, Michigan*; Aaron Molloy, Penn State*; Defense; Jack Maher, Indiana*; Johannes Bergmann, Maryland*; Jackson Ragen, Michigan; Brandon Hackenberg, Penn State; Goalkeeper; Andrew Verdi, Michigan	Forward; Eric Matzelevich, Maryland; Matt Moderwell, Northwestern; Midfield; Joshua Penn, Indiana; Marc Ybarra, Michigan; Jack Holland, Ohio State; Pablo Ávila, Rutgers; Defense; Spencer Glass, Indiana; Simon Waever, Indiana; Patrick Nielsen, Michigan State; Garrett Opperman, Northwestern; Goalkeeper; Niklas Neumann, Maryland	Herbert Endeley, Indiana; Aidan Morris, Indiana*; Joshua Penn, Indiana*; Malcolm Johnson, Maryland; Nick Richardson, Maryland; Derick Broche, Michigan; Liam Butts, Penn State*; Kris Shakes, Penn State; Jalen Watson, Penn State*; Hugo Le Guennec, Rutgers; Jackson Temple, Rutgers*	Jack Maher, Indiana; Nick Richardson, Maryland; Kevin Buca, Michigan; Cody Sweatte, Michigan State; Mac Mazolla, Northwestern; Parker Siegfried, Ohio State; Will Campbell, Penn State; Jake Longo, Rutgers; Noah Leibold, Wisconsin

* denotes unanimous selection

=== All-Americans ===
Consensus All-Americans
None

To earn "consensus" status, a player must win honors based on a point system computed from the four different all-America teams. The point system consists of three points for first team, two points for second team and one point for third team. No honorable mention or fourth team or lower are used in the computation. The top five totals plus ties are first team and the next five plus ties are second team.

College Soccer News	Soccer America	Top Drawer Soccer	United Soccer Coaches
First Team
None	None	None	None
Second Team
Aaron Molloy – Penn State	Jack Maher – Indiana; Aaron Molloy – Penn State	None	Jack Maher – Indiana; Aaron Molloy – Penn State
Third Team
Jack Maher – Indiana	Aidan Morris – Indiana	Jack Maher – Indiana	Aidan Morris – Indiana

=== Other awards ===
- TopDrawerSoccer.com National Freshman of the Year Award: Aidan Morris, Indiana

== 2020 MLS Draft ==
The 2020 MLS SuperDraft was held in January 2020. Nine Big Ten players were selected in the draft, all in the first three rounds.

Rnd.	Pick	Player	Pos.	Team	School
1	2	Jack Maher	DF	Nashville SC	Indiana (So.)
1	16	Aaron Molloy	MF	Portland Timbers	Penn State (Sr.)
1	23	Patrick Nielsen	DF	Atlanta United	Michigan State (RS-Jr.)
2	46	Michael Wetungu	DF	Real Salt Lake	Michigan State (Sr.)
2	50	Jack Hallahan	MF	Los Angeles FC	Michigan (Sr.)
2	51	Simon Waever	DF	Real Salt Lake	Indiana (Sr.)
3	53	Joris Ahlinvi	MF	FC Cincinnati	Indiana (Sr.)
3	65	Andrew Verdi	GK	D.C. United	Michigan (Sr.)
3	74	Parker Siegfried	GK	New York City FC	Ohio State (RS-Sr.)

== Homegrown players ==
The Homegrown Player Rule is a Major League Soccer program that allows MLS teams to sign local players from their own development academies directly to MLS first team rosters. Before the creation of the rule in 2008, every player entering Major League Soccer had to be assigned through one of the existing MLS player allocation processes, such as the MLS SuperDraft.

To place a player on its homegrown player list, making him eligible to sign as a homegrown player, players must have resided in that club's home territory and participated in the club's youth development system for at least one year. Players can play college soccer and still be eligible to sign a homegrown contract.

Original MLS team	Player	Pos.	School	Ref.
Columbus Crew	Aidan Morris	MF	Indiana (Fr.)	
