= 2019 Michigan Wolverines men's soccer team =

American college soccer season

2019 Michigan Wolverines men's soccer

Big 10 Tournament Runner-up

NCAA Tournament, Third Round
- Conference: Big Ten Conference
- U. Soc. Coaches poll: No. 17
- TopDrawerSoccer.com: No. 16
- Record: 11–5–6 (4–1–3 Big Ten)
- Head coach: Chaka Daley (8th season)
- Assistant coaches: Tommy McMenemy (10th season); Jhojan Obando (8th season); Marcos Ugarte (3rd season)
- Home stadium: U-M Soccer Stadium

2019 Big Ten Conference men's soccer standings
	Conf.					Overall
Team	W		L		T	W		L		T
No. 9 Indiana ‡	7	–	1	–	0	15	–	3	–	4
No. 18 Penn State +	6	–	1	–	1	12	–	4	–	3
No. 17 Michigan +	4	–	1	–	3	11	–	5	–	6
Maryland +	3	–	3	–	2	11	–	8	–	2
Northwestern	3	–	3	–	2	8	–	8	–	2
Michigan State	3	–	4	–	1	3	–	12	–	3
Wisconsin	1	–	4	–	3	3	–	11	–	4
Rutgers	1	–	6	–	1	7	–	8	–	3
Ohio State	1	–	6	–	1	7	–	11	–	1
‡ – 2019 B1G Tournament champion + – Invited to the 2019 NCAA tournament; As of 17 December 2019; Rankings from United Soccer Coaches; Source: Big Ten

The 2019 Michigan Wolverines men's soccer team is the college's 20th season of playing organized men's college soccer. It is the Wolverines' 20th season playing in the Big Ten Conference.

== Player movement ==
=== Arrivals ===
Name	Nat.	Hometown	Club	TDS Rating
Moshtaba Al-Hasnawi; FW/MF	IRQ	Dearborn, MI	Vardar	3/5 stars
Brennan Callow; DF	USA	Cincinnati, OH	Cincinnati United	2/5 stars
Owen Finnerty; GK	USA	Walled Lake, MI	Detroit City	3/5 stars
Carter Payne; DF	USA	Phoenix, AZ	Barca Academy (AZ)	3/5 stars
Harry Pithers; MF	USA	Tampa, FL	Chargers SC	NR
Christian Pulselli; FW	ITA	Pembroke, MA	Boston Bolts	3/5 stars
Evan Rasmussen; MF	USA	Libertyville, IL	Libertyville FC	2/5 stars
Inaki Rodriguez; MF	CHI	Santiago, CHI	Northwood Huskies	3/5 stars
Ryan Schultz; DF	USA	Short Hills, NJ	New York Red Bulls	3/5 stars

== Squad information ==
=== Roster ===
No.	Player	Nat.	State	Year	Date of birth (age)	High School	Club Team	Apps	Goals
Goalkeepers
1	Andrew Verdi	(United States)	(Pennsylvania)	Sr.	March 30, 1998 (age 21)	YSC Academy	Philadelphia Union	14	0
18	Jacob Nunner	(United States)	(Michigan)	Jr.	August 2, 1999 (age 20)	De La Salle Collegiate	Vardar	0	0
22	Owen Finnerty	(United States)	(Michigan)	Fr.	February 7, 2001 (age 18)	Detroit Catholic Central	Detroit City	0	0
Defenders
2	Carter Payne	(United States)	(Arizona)	Fr.	August 15, 2001 (age 18)	Shadow Mountain	Barca Academy	0	0
3	Ryan Schultz	(United States)	(New Jersey)	Fr.	March 4, 2001 (age 18)	Millburn	New York Red Bulls	0	0
4	Joel Harrison	(Canada)	(British Columbia)	Jr.	August 6, 1999 (age 20)	Burnaby Central	Vancouver Whitecaps	8	0
5	Abdou Samake	(Mali)	(Quebec)	Sr.	October 7, 1996 (age 23)	Louis-Riel (ON)	Montreal Impact	32	0
12	Austin Swiech	(United States)	(Michigan)	Jr.	June 2, 1998 (age 21)	Jenison	Midwest United	22	1
13	Declan Gaffney	(United States)	(California)	So.	October 6, 1999 (age 20)	Loyola (CA)	Pataeadores	10	0
25	Jackson Ragen	(United States)	(Washington (state))	Jr.	September 24, 1998 (age 21)	University Prep	Seattle Sounders FC	37	3
26	C.Y. Cheng	(Hong Kong)	(Connecticut)	So.	November 23, 1998 (age 21)	Hotchkiss	Black Rock	0	0
30	Brennan Callow	(United States)	(Ohio)	Fr.	January 29, 2001 (age 18)	Seven Hills (OH)	Cincinnati United	0	0
Midfielders
6	Carlos Tellez	(Mexico)	(Florida)	Jr.	August 6, 1999 (age 20)	Archbishop McCarthy	Weston FC	8	0
8	Inaki Rodriguez	(Chile)	(New York (state))	Fr.		Northwood (NY)	N/A	0	0
14	Harry Pithers	(United States)	(Florida)	Fr.	May 31, 2000 (age 19)	Berkeley Prep	Chargers SC	0	0
15	Evan Rasmussen	(United States)	(Michigan)	Fr.	April 10, 2001 (age 18)	Libertyville	Libertyville FC	0	0
19	Kevin Buca	(United States)	(Michigan)	So.	November 20, 2000 (age 19)	Stoney Creek (MI)	Vardar	9	0
20	Aidan Nam	(United States)	(Michigan)	So.	June 10, 2000 (age 19)	Saline (MI)	Columbus Crew	0	0
21	Joe Hertgen	(United States)	(New Jersey)	Sr.	January 11, 1998 (age 21)	Toms River North	PDA	2	0
23	Marc Ybarra	(United States)	(Michigan)	Jr.	December 18, 1998 (age 20)	Skyline (MI)	Columbus Crew	40	4
27	Moshtaba Al-Hasnawi	(Iraq)	(Michigan)	Fr.	January 13, 2001 (age 18)	Fordson	Vardar	0	0
Forwards
7	Derick Broche	(United States)	(Michigan)	So.	March 1, 2000 (age 19)	Novi	Columbus Crew	0	0
9	Mohammed Zakyi	(Ghana)	(Connecticut)	Jr.	April 6, 1998 (age 21)	Canterbury (CT)	Oakwood SC	31	8
10	Umar Farouk Osman	(Ghana)	(Connecticut)	Jr.	September 23, 1998 (age 21)	Hotchkiss	Black Rock	41	9
11	Jack Hallahan	(Republic of Ireland)	(Dublin)	Sr.	November 17, 1996 (age 23)	St. Augustine Catholic	West Bromwich Albion	59	21
16	Christian Pulselli	(Italy)	(Massachusetts)	Fr.	May 15, 2001 (age 18)	Pembroke	Boston Bolts	0	0
17	Sosa Emovon	(Canada)	(Ontario)	So.	April 19, 2000 (age 19)	St. Thomas Aquinas	Vardar	8	0
33	Nebojša Popović	(Serbia)	(Michigan)	Gr.		Rochester (MI)	Vardar	0	0

=== Coaching staff ===
Position	Name
Manager	(Canada) Chaka Daley
Assistant Coach	(England) Tommy McMenemy
Assistant Coach	(United States) Jhojan Obando
Volunteer Assistant Coach	(United States) Marcos Ugarte
Program Assistant	(United States) Justin Makar

== Preseason ==
=== Preseason Big Ten poll ===
Michigan was predicted to finish third in the Big Ten Conference.

Coaches' Poll
Predicted finish	Team
1	Indiana
2	Maryland
3	Michigan
4	Michigan State
5	Wisconsin
6	Penn State
7	Northwestern
8	Ohio State
9	Rutgers

== Schedule ==
Date Time, TV	Rank^{#}	Opponent^{#}	Result	Record	Site (Attendance) City, State
Preseason
August 17*; 2:00 p.m.	No. 24	at Cincinnati	W 2–1		Gettler Stadium (312); Cincinnati, OH
August 23*; 3:30 p.m.	No. 24	at No. 3 Akron	L 2–3		Cub Cadet Field; Akron, OH
Regular season
August 30*; 7:30 p.m., BTN+	No. 24	Florida Gulf Coast	L 3–4	0–1–0	U-M Soccer Stadium (1,602); Ann Arbor, MI
September 2*; 1:00 p.m., BTN+	No. 24	SIU Edwardsville	W 3–1	1–1–0	U-M Soccer Stadium (1,452); Ann Arbor, MI
September 6*; 5:00 p.m., BTN+		Cornell	W 3–0	2–1–0	U-M Soccer Stadium (1,252); Ann Arbor, MI
September 8*; 6:00 p.m., BTN+		No. 13 Washington	L 0–1	2–2–0	U-M Soccer Stadium (704); Ann Arbor, MI
September 13*; 8:00 p.m., WOWT		at Omaha	T 1–1 ^{2OT}	2–2–1	Al F. Caniglia Field (1,006); Omaha, NE
September 17*; 7:30 p.m., BTN+		Oakland	W 2–0	3–2–1	U-M Soccer Stadium (336); Ann Arbor, MI
September 21; 3:00 p.m., BTN+		No. 24 Rutgers	T 1–1 (Note: The Rutgers match was called off in the 71st minute due to inclement weather. The final scoreline was deemed the final score without an overtime period.)	3–2–2 (0–0–1)	U-M Soccer Stadium (903); Ann Arbor, MI
September 27; 6:00 p.m., BTN		at Penn State	T 0–0 ^{2OT}	3–2–3 (0–0–2)	Jeffrey Field (1,985); State College, PA
October 2; 7:00 p.m., BTN+		at Ohio State	W 2–0	4–2–3 (1–0–2)	Jesse Owens Memorial Stadium (1,221); Columbus, OH
October 6; 4:00 p.m., BTN+		Northwestern	W 3–0	5–2–3 (2–0–2)	U-M Soccer Stadium (1,351); Ann Arbor, MI
October 9*; 7:30 p.m., BTN+		Detroit Mercy	W 1–0	6–2–3	U-M Soccer Stadium (611); Ann Arbor, MI
October 13; 3:00 p.m., ESPNU		at No. 4 Indiana	L 0–1	6–3–3 (2–1–2)	Bill Armstrong Stadium (2,500); Bloomington, IN
October 17*; 7:30 p.m.		Western Michigan	L 1–2	6–4–3	U-M Soccer Stadium (453); Ann Arbor, MI
October 22*; 7:00 p.m., ACCN		at Notre Dame	W 1–0	7–4–3	Alumni Field (585); South Bend, IN
October 25; 6:00 p.m., BTN+		Wisconsin	T 1–1 ^{2OT}	7–4–4 (2–1–3)	U-M Soccer Stadium (1,207); Ann Arbor, MI
October 29; 8:00 p.m., BTN		Michigan State; Big Bear Trophy	W 2–0	8–4–4 (3–1–3)	U-M Soccer Stadium (1,529); Ann Arbor, MI
November 3; 8:00 p.m., ESPNU		at No. 17 Maryland	W 4–2	9–4–4 (4–1–3)	Ludwig Field (3,128); College Park, MD
Big Ten Tournament
November 10; 4:00 p.m., BTN	(3)	(6) Michigan State; Quarterfinal	W 2–1	10–4–4	U-M Soccer Stadium (979); Ann Arbor, MI
November 15; 4:00 p.m., BTN	(3)	vs. (2) No. 12 Penn State; Semifinal	W 1–0	11–4–4	Ludwig Field; College Park, MD
November 17; 2:00 p.m., BTN	(3)	vs. (1) No. 8 Indiana; Championship Game	T 0–0 (3–4 PKs) ^{2OT}	11–4–5	Ludwig Field (320); College Park, MD
NCAA Tournament
November 24; 1:00 p.m., BTN+	(13) No. 17	Wright State; Second Round	T 0–0 (5–4 PKs) ^{2OT}	11–4–6	U-M Soccer Stadium (1,048); Ann Arbor, MI
December 1; 5:00 p.m., ACCNX	(13) No. 17	at (4) No. 9 Wake Forest; Third Round	L 1–3	11–5–6	Spry Soccer Stadium (1,206); Winston-Salem, NC
*Non-conference game. ^{#}Rankings from United Soccer Coaches. (#) Tournament seedings in parentheses.

== Rankings ==
Ranking movement Legend: ██ Improvement in ranking. ██ Decrease in ranking. ██ Not ranked the previous week. RV=Others receiving votes.
Poll	Pre	Wk 1	Wk 2	Wk 3	Wk 4	Wk 5	Wk 6	Wk 7	Wk 8	Wk 9	Wk 10	Wk 11	Wk 12	Wk 13	Wk 14	Wk 15	Wk 16	Final
United Soccer	24	RV	RV	NV	NV									None Released				
TopDrawer Soccer	13	13	RV	NV	NV	NV												

== Awards ==
Date	Player	Award	Ref.

== 2020 MLS SuperDraft ==
Player	Round	Pick	Position	MLS club	Ref.
Jack Hallahan	2	50	MF	Los Angeles FC	
Andrew Verdi	3	65	GK	D.C. United	

== See also ==
- 2019 Michigan Wolverines women's soccer team
- 2019 NCAA Division I men's soccer season
- 2019 Big Ten Conference men's soccer season
