= 2019 Indiana Hoosiers men's soccer team =

American college soccer season

2019 Indiana Hoosiers men's soccer

Big Ten regular season and tournament champions Adidas/IU Credit Union Classic Champions

NCAA Tournament, Third Round
- Conference: Big Ten Conference
- U. Soc. Coaches poll: No. 6
- TopDrawerSoccer.com: No. 6
- Record: 15–3–4 (7–1–0 Big Ten)
- Head coach: Todd Yeagley (10th season)
- Assistant coaches: Kevin Robson (6th season); Zac Brown (3rd season); Danny O'Rourke (2nd season)
- Captains: Sean Caulfield; Spencer Glass; Jack Maher
- Home stadium: Bill Armstrong Stadium

2019 Big Ten Conference men's soccer standings
	Conf.					Overall
Team	W		L		T	W		L		T
No. 9 Indiana ‡	7	–	1	–	0	15	–	3	–	4
No. 18 Penn State +	6	–	1	–	1	12	–	4	–	3
No. 17 Michigan +	4	–	1	–	3	11	–	5	–	6
Maryland +	3	–	3	–	2	11	–	8	–	2
Northwestern	3	–	3	–	2	8	–	8	–	2
Michigan State	3	–	4	–	1	3	–	12	–	3
Wisconsin	1	–	4	–	3	3	–	11	–	4
Rutgers	1	–	6	–	1	7	–	8	–	3
Ohio State	1	–	6	–	1	7	–	11	–	1
‡ – 2019 B1G Tournament champion + – Invited to the 2019 NCAA tournament; As of 17 December 2019; Rankings from United Soccer Coaches; Source: Big Ten

The 2019 Indiana Hoosiers men's soccer team represented Indiana University Bloomington in men's college soccer during the 2019 NCAA Division I men's soccer season and 2019 Big Ten Conference men's soccer season. It was the 47th season the university fielded a men's varsity soccer program, and the 29th season the program played in the Big Ten Conference.

Indiana entered the 2019 season as the defending Big Ten Conference regular season and tournament champions.

== Background ==
The 2018 Indiana Hoosiers men's soccer team represented Indiana University Bloomington in men's college soccer during the 2018 NCAA Division I men's soccer season and 2018 Big Ten Conference men's soccer season. It was the 46th season the university fielded a men's varsity soccer program, and the 28th season the program played in the Big Ten Conference.

During the regular season Indiana completed the league double by winning both the Big Ten regular season, and the 2018 Big Ten Conference Men's Soccer Tournament. The Hoosiers were seeded second overall in the 2018 NCAA Division I Men's Soccer Tournament, where they reached the College Cup before losing to eventual national champions, and fellow Big Ten side, Maryland.

Indiana defender, Andrew Gutman, was named the winner of the Hermann Trophy, the top individual award a men's college soccer player can earn.

== Player movement ==
=== Departures ===
Name	Nat.	No.	Pos.	Height	Year	Hometown	Reason for departure
Jeremiah Gutjahr	USA	17	MF	5 ft 10 in (1.78 m)	Senior	Bloomington, IN	Signed homegrown contract with Chicago Fire
Trey Muse	USA	1	GK	6 ft 4 in (1.93 m)	Sophomore	Louisville, KY	Signed homegrown contract with Seattle Sounders FC
Justin Rennicks	USA	10	MF	5 ft 11 in (1.80 m)	Sophomore	South Hamilton, MA	Signed homegrown contract with New England Revolution
Griffin Dorsey	USA	99	MF	6 ft 0 in (1.83 m)	Sophomore	Evergreen, CO	Declared for 2019 MLS Draft; selected by Toronto FC (GA)
Rece Buckmaster	USA	19	DF	5 ft 8 in (1.73 m)	Senior	Auburn, IN	Graduated; selected in 2019 MLS Draft by New York Red Bulls
Francesco Moore	USA	13	MF	5 ft 10 in (1.78 m)	Senior	Highland Park, IL	Graduated; selected in 2019 MLS Draft by Portland Timbers
Timmy Mehl	USA	5	DF	6 ft 1 in (1.85 m)	Senior	Manhattan Beach, CA	Graduated; signed with North Carolina FC
Trevor Swartz	USA	7	MF	5 ft 10 in (1.78 m)	RS Senior	Cameron Park, CA	Graduated; signed with Toronto FC II
Austin Panchot	USA	12	MF	5 ft 7 in (1.70 m)	Senior	St. Louis, MO	Graduated; signed with North Carolina FC
Andrew Gutman	USA	15	DF	6 ft 0 in (1.83 m)	Senior	Hinsdale, IL	Graduated; signed with Celtic
Cory Thomas	USA	11	MF	6 ft 0 in (1.83 m)	RS Senior	Corydon, IN	Graduated

=== Players arriving ===
Name	Nat.	Hometown	High School Team	Club Team	TDS Rating	IMG 150
Brett Bebej; DF	USA	Shorewood, IL	—N/a	Chicago Fire	3/5 stars	NR
Victor Bezerra; FW	USA	Chicago, IL	—N/a	Chicago Fire	3/5 stars	79
Luke Boha; MF	USA	Bargersville, IN	Center Grove	Alliance FC	2/5 stars	NR
Roman Celetano; GK	ITA	Naperville, IL	—N/a	Chicago Sockers	3/5 stars	NR
Brennan Conger; MF	USA	Cornelius, NC	—N/a	D.C. United	3/5 stars	81
Herbert Endeley; FW	USA	Blaine, MN	Totino-Grace	—N/a	3/5 stars	NR
Andrew Goldsworthy; DF	USA	Bloomington, IN	Bloomington North	Indiana Fire	3/5 stars	144
Maouloune Goumballe; FW	SEN	Cincinnati, OH	—N/a	Columbus Crew	3/5 stars	NR
Alex McGill; MF	USA	Columbus, IN	Columbus North	Indiana Fire	2/5 stars	NR
Aidan Morris; MF	USA	Fort Lauderdale, FL	—N/a	Columbus Crew	4/5 stars	61
Joshua Penn; FW	USA	Naperville, IL	—N/a	Chicago Sockers	4/5 stars	12

=== Transfers ===
Name	Nat.	No.	Pos.	Height	Year	Hometown	Notes
Simon Waever	DEN	3	DF	5 ft 11 in (1.80 m)	Senior	Holte, DEN	Transferred from Evansville
Joris Ahlinvi	FRA	10	MF	5 ft 11 in (1.80 m)	Senior	Gujan-Mestras, FRA	Transferred from FIU

== Preseason ==
=== Preseason Big Ten poll ===
Indiana was predicted to finish 1st in the Big Ten Conference.

Coaches' Poll
Predicted finish	Team
1	Indiana
2	Maryland
3	Michigan
4	Michigan State
5	Wisconsin
6	Penn State
7	Northwestern
8	Ohio State
9	Rutgers

== Roster ==
As of August 16, 2019

Note: Flags indicate national team as defined under FIFA eligibility rules; some limited exceptions apply. Players may hold more than one non-FIFA nationality.

No.	Pos.	Nation	Player
0	GK	USA	Bryant Pratt
1	GK	USA	Sean Caulfield
2	DF	USA	Jordan Kleyn
3	DF	DEN	Simon Waever
4	DF	USA	A. J. Palazzolo
5	DF	USA	Daniel Munie
6	MF	USA	Jack Maher
7	FW	USA	Victor Bezerra
8	MF	USA	Aidan Morris
9	FW	USA	Thomas Warr
10	MF	FRA	Joris Ahlinvi
11	FW	USA	Joshua Penn
12	MF	NED	Quentin Helmer
14	MF	SEN	Maouloune Goumballe
16	MF	USA	Joe Schmidt

No.	Pos.	Nation	Player
17	FW	USA	Herbert Endeley
18	FW	USA	Ryan Winttenbrink
19	DF	USA	Brett Bebej
20	MF	USA	Ben Yeagley
21	DF	USA	Spencer Glass
22	FW	USA	Ian Black
23	MF	USA	Isaac Sarosy
24	DF	USA	Andrew Goldsworthy
25	MF	GRE	Trey Kapsalis
26	MF	USA	Brennan Conger
27	MF	USA	Alex McGill
28	DF	USA	John Bannec
29	MF	USA	Luke Boha
30	GK	USA	Jacob Gruber
32	GK	ITA	Roman Celetano

== Schedule ==
Date Time, TV	Rank^{#}	Opponent^{#}	Result	Record	Site (Attendance) City, State
Preseason
August 19*; 7:00 p.m.	No. 2	vs. Bowling Green	W 3–0		Grand Park; Westfield, IN
August 21*; 7:00 p.m.	No. 2	vs. No. 14 Louisville	L 1–2		Grand Park; Westfield, IN
August 24*; 8:00 p.m., w	No. 2	DePaul	W 3–1		Bill Armstrong Stadium; Bloomington, IN
Regular season
August 30*; 8:00 p.m., BTN+	No. 2	Pittsburgh; Adidas/IU Credit Union Classic	W 3–2 ^{2OT}	1–0–0	Bill Armstrong Stadium (2,847); Bloomington, IN
September 2*; 10:30 a.m. (Note: The game against UCLA was originally scheduled for 7:00 p.m. ET on September 1, but was postponed due to inclement weather.), BTN	No. 2	UCLA; Adidas/IU Credit Union Classic	W 2–1 ^{2OT}	2–0–0	Bill Armstrong Stadium (1,877); Bloomington, IN
September 6*; 4:00 p.m.	No. 2	vs. No. 18 Denver; Mike Berticelli Memorial Tournament	W 2–1 ^{OT}	3–0–0	Alumni Stadium (686); South Bend, IN
September 8*; 4:00 p.m.	No. 2	vs. Seattle; Mike Berticelli Memorial Tournament	T 0–0 ^{2OT}	3–0–1	Alumni Stadium (641); South Bend, IN
September 17*; 4:00 p.m., BTN	No. 4	No. 16 Notre Dame; Rivalry	T 1–1 ^{2OT}	3–0–2	Bill Armstrong Stadium (2,392); Bloomington, IN
September 20; 5:30 p.m., BTN	No. 4	Wisconsin	W 3–1	4–0–2 (1–0–0)	Bill Armstrong Stadium (2,926); Bloomington, IN
September 24*; 5:30 p.m., YouTubeTV	No. 5	at Butler	L 1–2	4–1–2	Sellick Bowl (4,312); Indianapolis, IN
September 27*; 7:30 p.m., BTN+	No. 5	Sacramento State	W 1–0	5–1–2	Bill Armstrong Stadium (2,188); Bloomington, IN
October 1; 8:00 p.m., BTN	No. 8	at Northwestern	W 3–1	6–1–2 (2–0–0)	Martin Stadium (766); Evanston, IL
October 6; 1:00 p.m., BTN+	No. 8	at No. 20 Penn State	W 3–1	7–1–2 (3–0–0)	Jeffrey Field (925); State College, PA
October 9*; 7:00 p.m., FS1	No. 4	No. 16 Kentucky; Rivalry	T 0–0 ^{2OT}	7–1–3	Bill Armstrong Stadium (2,178); Bloomington, IN
October 13; 3:00 p.m., ESPNU	No. 4	Michigan	W 1–0	8–1–3 (4–0–0)	Bill Armstrong Stadium (2,500); Bloomington, IN
October 18; 6:30 p.m., BTN	No. 6	at No. 25 Maryland	L 0–3	8–2–3 (4–1–0)	Ludwig Field (4,888); College Park, MD
October 22*; 7:00 p.m., BTN+	No. 6	Evansville	W 5–1	9–2–3	Bill Armstrong Stadium (1,467); Bloomington, IN
October 25; 7:00 p.m., BTN+	No. 10	Rutgers	W 3–0	10–2–3 (5–1–0)	Bill Armstrong Stadium (2,015); Bloomington, IN
October 29; 7:00 p.m., BTN+	No. 10	Ohio State	W 5–1	11–2–3 (6–1–0)	Bill Armstrong Stadium (1,554); Bloomington, IN
November 3; 3:00 p.m., BTN+	No. 10	at Michigan State	W 1–0	12–2–3 (7–1–0)	DeMartin Soccer Complex (875); East Lansing, MI
Big Ten Tournament
November 10; 1:00 p.m., BTN+	(1) No. 9	vs. (8) Ohio State; Quarterfinals	W 2–0	13–2–3	Bill Armstrong Stadium (1,384); Bloomington, IN
November 15; 7:00 p.m., BTN+	(1) No. 8	at (5) No. 22 Maryland; Semifinals	W 1–0 ^{2OT}	14–2–3	Ludwig Field (1,660); College Park, MD
November 17; 2:00 p.m., BTN+	(1) No. 8	vs. (3) No. 17 Michigan; Finals	T 0–0 (4–3 PKs) ^{2OT}	14–2–4	Ludwig Field (320); College Park, MD
NCAA Tournament
November 24; 12:00 p.m., BTN	(5) No. 6	No. 19 Kentucky; Second Round	W 3–0	15–2–4	Bill Armstrong Stadium (1,106); Bloomington, IN
December 1; 12:00 p.m., BTN	(5) No. 6	No. 22 UC Santa Barbara; Third Round	L 0–1 ^{2OT}	15–3–4	Bill Armstrong Stadium (712); Bloomington, IN
*Non-conference game. ^{#}Rankings from United Soccer Coaches. (#) Tournament seedings in parentheses.

== Rankings ==
Ranking movement Legend: ██ Improvement in ranking. ██ Decrease in ranking. ██ Not ranked the previous week. RV=Others receiving votes.
Poll	Pre	Wk 1	Wk 2	Wk 3	Wk 4	Wk 5	Wk 6	Wk 7	Wk 8	Wk 9	Wk 10	Wk 11	Wk 12	Wk 13	Wk 14	Wk 15	Wk 16	Final
United Soccer	2	2	4	4	5									None Released				
TopDrawer Soccer	5	5	4	4	5	8												

== Statistics ==
=== Appearances and goals ===
No.	Pos.	Player	Regular season			B1G Tournament			NCAA Tournament			Total		
No.	Pos.	Player	Apps	Goals	Asst.	Apps	Goals	Asst.	Apps	Goals	Asst.	Apps	Goals	Asst.
0	GK	(United States) Bryant Pratt	0	0	0	0	0	0	0	0	0	0	0	0
1	GK	(United States) Sean Caulfield	2	0	0	0	0	0	0	0	0	2	0	0
2	DF	(United States) Jordan Kleyn	2	0	0	0	0	0	0	0	0	2	0	0
3	DF	(Denmark) Simon Waever	2	0	0	0	0	0	0	0	0	2	0	0
4	DF	(United States) A. J. Palazzolo	2	0	1	0	0	0	0	0	0	2	0	1
5	DF	(United States) Daniel Munie	2	0	1	0	0	0	0	0	0	2	0	0
6	MF	(United States) Jack Maher	2	1	1	0	0	0	0	0	0	2	0	1
7	FW	(United States) Victor Bezerra	2	1	0	0	0	0	0	0	0	2	0	0
8	MF	(United States) Aidan Morris	2	0	0	0	0	0	0	0	0	2	0	0
9	FW	(United States) Thomas Warr	2	0	0	0	0	0	0	0	0	2	0	0
10	MF	(France) Joris Ahlinvi	0	0	0	0	0	0	0	0	0	0	0	0
11	FW	(United States) Joshua Penn	2	1	0	0	0	0	0	0	0	2	1	0
12	MF	(Netherlands) Quentin Helmer	0	0	0	0	0	0	0	0	0	0	0	0
14	MF	(Senegal) Maouloune Goumballe	2	0	0	0	0	0	0	0	0	2	0	0
16	MF	(United States) Joe Schmidt	2	0	0	0	0	0	0	0	0	2	0	0
17	FW	(United States) Herbert Endeley	2	1	0	0	0	0	0	0	0	2	1	0
18	FW	(United States) Ryan Wittenbrink	0	0	0	0	0	0	0	0	0	0	0	0
19	DF	(United States) Brett Bebej	0	0	0	0	0	0	0	0	0	0	0	0
20	MF	(United States) Ben Yeagley	0	0	0	0	0	0	0	0	0	0	0	0
21	DF	(United States) Spencer Glass	2	0	1	0	0	0	0	0	0	2	0	0
22	FW	(United States) Ian Black	2	1	1	0	0	0	0	0	0	2	1	1
23	MF	(United States) Isaac Sarosy	0	0	0	0	0	0	0	0	0	0	0	0
24	DF	(United States) Andrew Goldsworthy	0	0	0	0	0	0	0	0	0	0	0	0
25	MF	(Greece) Trey Kapsalis	0	0	0	0	0	0	0	0	0	0	0	0
26	MF	(United States) Brennan Conger	0	0	0	0	0	0	0	0	0	0	0	0
27	MF	(United States) Alex McGill	0	0	0	0	0	0	0	0	0	0	0	0
28	DF	(United States) John Bannec	0	0	0	0	0	0	0	0	0	0	0	0
29	MF	(United States) Luke Boha	0	0	0	0	0	0	0	0	0	0	0	0
30	GK	(United States) Jacob Gruber	0	0	0	0	0	0	0	0	0	0	0	0
32	GK	(Italy) Roman Celetano	0	0	0	0	0	0	0	0	0	0	0	0

=== Discipline ===
No.	Pos.	Player	Regular Season			B1G Tournament			NCAA Tournament			Total		
No.	Pos.	Player	Booked	(yellow card) (yellow-red card)	Sent off (straight red)	Booked	(yellow card) (yellow-red card)	Sent off (straight red)	Booked	(yellow card) (yellow-red card)	Sent off (straight red)	Booked	(yellow card) (yellow-red card)	Sent off (straight red)
0	GK	(United States) Bryant Pratt	0	0	0	0	0	0	0	0	0	0	0	0
1	GK	(United States) Sean Caulfield	0	0	0	0	0	0	0	0	0	0	0	0
2	DF	(United States) Jordan Kleyn	0	0	0	0	0	0	0	0	0	0	0	0
3	DF	(Denmark) Simon Waever	0	0	0	0	0	0	0	0	0	0	0	0
4	DF	(United States) A. J. Palazzolo	0	0	0	0	0	0	0	0	0	0	0	0
5	DF	(United States) Daniel Munie	0	0	0	0	0	0	0	0	0	0	0	0
6	MF	(United States) Jack Maher	0	0	0	0	0	0	0	0	0	0	0	0
7	FW	(United States) Victor Bezerra	0	0	0	0	0	0	0	0	0	0	0	0
8	MF	(United States) Aidan Morris	1	0	0	0	0	0	0	0	0	1	0	0
9	FW	(United States) Thomas Warr	0	0	0	0	0	0	0	0	0	0	0	0
10	MF	(France) Joris Ahlinvi	0	0	0	0	0	0	0	0	0	0	0	0
11	FW	(United States) Joshua Penn	0	0	0	0	0	0	0	0	0	0	0	0
12	MF	(Netherlands) Quentin Helmer	0	0	0	0	0	0	0	0	0	0	0	0
14	MF	(Senegal) Maouloune Goumballe	0	0	0	0	0	0	0	0	0	0	0	0
16	MF	(United States) Joe Schmidt	0	0	0	0	0	0	0	0	0	0	0	0
17	FW	(United States) Herbert Endeley	0	0	0	0	0	0	0	0	0	0	0	0
18	FW	(United States) Ryan Wittenbrink	0	0	0	0	0	0	0	0	0	0	0	0
19	DF	(United States) Brett Bebej	0	0	0	0	0	0	0	0	0	0	0	0
20	MF	(United States) Ben Yeagley	0	0	0	0	0	0	0	0	0	0	0	0
21	DF	(United States) Spencer Glass	0	0	0	0	0	0	0	0	0	0	0	0
22	FW	(United States) Ian Black	0	0	0	0	0	0	0	0	0	0	0	0
23	MF	(United States) Isaac Sarosy	0	0	0	0	0	0	0	0	0	0	0	0
24	DF	(United States) Andrew Goldsworthy	0	0	0	0	0	0	0	0	0	0	0	0
25	MF	(Greece) Trey Kapsalis	0	0	0	0	0	0	0	0	0	0	0	0
26	MF	(United States) Brennan Conger	0	0	0	0	0	0	0	0	0	0	0	0
27	MF	(United States) Alex McGill	0	0	0	0	0	0	0	0	0	0	0	0
28	DF	(United States) John Bannec	0	0	0	0	0	0	0	0	0	0	0	0
29	MF	(United States) Luke Boha	0	0	0	0	0	0	0	0	0	0	0	0
30	GK	(United States) Jacob Gruber	0	0	0	0	0	0	0	0	0	0	0	0
32	GK	(Italy) Roman Celetano	0	0	0	0	0	0	0	0	0	0	0	0

=== Summary ===
Competition	P	W	L	T	GF	GA	GD	PCT.	Pts.	Booked	(yellow card) (yellow-red card)	Sent off (straight red)
Regular Season	1	1	0	0	3	2	+1	1.000	3	1	0	0
Big Ten Tournament	0	0	0	0	0	0	0	.000	0	0	0	0
NCAA Tournament	0	0	0	0	0	0	0	.000	0	0	0	0
Total	1	1	0	0	3	2	+1	1.000	3	1	0	0

== Awards ==
Date	Player	Award	Ref.
August 1	Jack Maher	MAC Hermann Trophy Watchlist	

== 2020 MLS SuperDraft ==
Player	Round	Pick	Position	MLS club	Ref.
Jack Maher	1	2	DF	Nashville SC	
Simon Waever	2	51	DF	Toronto FC	
Joris Ahlinvi	3	53	MF	FC Cincinnati	

== Homegrown players ==
Player	Position	MLS club	Ref.
Aidan Morris	MF	Columbus Crew	

== See also ==
- 2019 Indiana Hoosiers women's soccer team
- 2019 NCAA Division I men's soccer season
- 2019 Big Ten Conference men's soccer season
