= 2019 Penn State Nittany Lions men's soccer team =

American college soccer season

2019 Penn State Nittany Lions men's soccer

NCAA Tournament, Second Round
- Conference: Big Ten Conference
- U. Soc. Coaches poll: No. 13
- TopDrawerSoccer.com: No. 18
- Record: 12–4–3 (6–1–1 Big Ten)
- Head coach: Jeff Cook (2nd season)
- Assistant coaches: Greg Dalby (2nd season); Ayotunde Ogunbiyi (2nd season); Jyler Noviello (1st season)
- Captains: Aaron Molloy; Pierre Reedy
- Home stadium: Jeffrey Field

2019 Big Ten Conference men's soccer standings
	Conf.					Overall
Team	W		L		T	W		L		T
No. 9 Indiana ‡	7	–	1	–	0	15	–	3	–	4
No. 18 Penn State +	6	–	1	–	1	12	–	4	–	3
No. 17 Michigan +	4	–	1	–	3	11	–	5	–	6
Maryland +	3	–	3	–	2	11	–	8	–	2
Northwestern	3	–	3	–	2	8	–	8	–	2
Michigan State	3	–	4	–	1	3	–	12	–	3
Wisconsin	1	–	4	–	3	3	–	11	–	4
Rutgers	1	–	6	–	1	7	–	8	–	3
Ohio State	1	–	6	–	1	7	–	11	–	1
‡ – 2019 B1G Tournament champion + – Invited to the 2019 NCAA tournament; As of 17 December 2019; Rankings from United Soccer Coaches; Source: Big Ten

The 2019 Penn State Nittany Lions men's soccer team represented Pennsylvania State University during the 2019 NCAA Division I men's soccer season and the 2019 Big Ten Conference men's soccer season. The regular season began on August 30 and concluded on November 3. It was the program's 107th season fielding a men's varsity soccer team, and their 29th season in the Big Ten Conference. The 2019 season is Jeff Cook's second year at the helm.

== Background ==
The 2018 season was the Nittany Lions' 106th season as a varsity soccer program, and their 28th season playing in the Big Ten Conference. The team was led by first year head coach, Jeff Cook, who had previously served as an assistant coach for the professional soccer team, Bethlehem Steel of USL Championship.

== Player movement ==
=== Departures ===
Name	Number	Position	Height	Weight	Year	Hometown	Reason for departure
Brennan Ireland	4	DF	5 ft 10 in (1.78 m)	170	Senior	Annapolis, MD	Graduated
Austin Maloney	9	MF	5 ft 4 in (1.63 m)	150	Senior	Harrisburg, PA	Graduated
Mac Curran	14	FW	5 ft 11 in (1.80 m)	185	Senior	York, PA	Graduated
Dani Marks	18	DF	6 ft 2 in (1.88 m)	185	RS-Senior	Ra'anana, ISR	Graduated
Ryan Gallagher	19	DF	6 ft 1 in (1.85 m)	170	RS-Senior	Pine Bush, NY	Graduated
Noah Pilato	21	MF	5 ft 9 in (1.75 m)	140	RS-Senior	Oak Hill, VA	Graduated; signed for Loudoun United FC in USLC

=== Arrivals ===
Name	Nat.	Hometown	High School	Club	TDS Rating
Liam Butts; FW	USA	Lawrenceville, GA	Grayson	Atlanta United	3/5 stars
Owen Elliott; GK	USA	Philadelphia, PA	Chestnut Hill (PA)	SJEB Rush	2/5 stars
Michael Gaines; DF	USA	Oxon Hill, MD	Gonzaga (DC)	D.C. United	3/5 stars
Kyle May; MF	USA	Lebanon, PA	Cedar Crest (PA)	PA Classics	2/5 stars
Omar Ozbay; MF	USA	Morganville, NJ	Marlboro (NJ)	Baltimore Celtic	NR
Andrew Privett; MF	USA	Fallston, MD	McDonogh	Baltimore Celtic	3/5 stars
Kris Shakes; GK	USA	Sunrise, FL	YSC Academy	Philadelphia Union	4/5 stars
Alex Stevenson; DF	USA	Bel Air, MD	C. Milton Wright	Baltimore Armour	4/5 stars
Jalen Watson; DF	CAN	Toronto, ON	U-Hill (BC)	Vancouver Whitecaps	3/5 stars

=== Transfers ===
Name	Nat.	No.	Pos.	Height	Year	Hometown	Notes
Seth Kuhn	USA	17	MF	5 ft 11 in (1.80 m)	Sophomore	Wyomissing, PA	Transferred from Duke
Will Campbell	USA	20	DF	6 ft 1 in (1.85 m)	Graduate	Wallington, PA	Transferred from North Carolina

== Preseason ==
=== Preseason Big Ten poll ===
Penn State was predicted to finish 6th in the Big Ten Conference.

Coaches' Poll
Predicted finish	Team
1	Indiana
2	Maryland
3	Michigan
4	Michigan State
5	Wisconsin
6	Penn State
7	Northwestern
8	Ohio State
9	Rutgers

== Squad ==
=== Roster ===
As of September 26, 2019

Note: Flags indicate national team as defined under FIFA eligibility rules; some limited exceptions apply. Players may hold more than one non-FIFA nationality.

No.	Pos.	Nation	Player
1	GK	(United States) USA	Josh Levine
2	DF	(United States) USA	Mason Deeds
3	DF	(United States) USA	Brandon Hackenberg
4	DF	(Canada) CAN	Jalen Watson
5	MF	(England) ENG	Callum Pritchatt
6	MF	(United States) USA	Andrew Privett
7	FW	(United States) USA	Liam Butts
8	MF	(Republic of Ireland) IRL	Aaron Molloy (co-captain)
11	MF	(United States) USA	Pierre Reedy (co-captain)
12	MF	(United States) USA	Nicholas Rieple
13	GK	(United States) USA	Kris Shakes
14	DF	(United States) USA	Michael Gaines

No.	Pos.	Nation	Player
15	DF	(United States) USA	Adam Laundree
16	MF	(United States) USA	Keegan Ness
17	MF	(United States) USA	Seth Kuhn
18	DF	(United States) USA	Alex Stevenson
19	MF	(United States) USA	Omar Ozbay
20	DF	(United States) USA	Will Campbell
21	MF	(United States) USA	Kyle May
22	MF	(Costa Rica) CRC	Daniel Gonzalez
23	FW	(United States) USA	Kyle Perno
24	FW	(United States) USA	Christian Sload
25	DF	(United States) USA	Dax Hoffman
26	FW	(United States) USA	Josh Dabora
27	GK	(United States) USA	Owen Elliott

=== Team management ===
Front office
Athletic Director	Sandy Barbour
Deputy Director of Athletics	Lynn Holleran
Deputy Director of Athletics	Scott Sidwell
Coaching staff
Head coach	Jeff Cook
Assistant coach	Greg Dalby
Assistant coach	Ayotunde Ogunbiyi
Volunteer assistant coach	Jyler Noviello

Last updated: September 6, 2019
Source: Penn State Athletics

== Schedule ==
Date Time, TV	Rank^{#}	Opponent^{#}	Result	Record	Site (Attendance) City, State
Preseason
August 17*; 7:00 p.m.		Georgetown	Not reported		Jeffrey Field; State College, PA
August 24*; 7:00 p.m.		Syracuse	L 0–1		Jeffery Field; State College, PA
Regular season
August 30*; 7:00 p.m.		No. 5 Stanford	L 0–5	0–1–0	Jeffrey Field (1,537); State College, PA
September 2*; 7:00 p.m.		at Stony Brook	W 4–1	1–1–0	Kenneth P. LaValle Stadium (618); Stony Brook, NY
September 6*; 7:00 p.m., Twitch		at No. 15 UCF	T 2–2 ^{2OT}	1–1–1	UCF Soccer and Track Stadium (706); Orlando, FL
September 8*; 1:00 p.m.		at Stetson	W 2–0	2–1–1	Spec Martin Stadium (312); DeLand, FL
September 13*; 7:00 p.m.		Villanova	W 1–0	3–1–1	Jeffrey Field (805); State College, PA
September 21; 7:00 p.m.		at Ohio State	W 2–1 ^{OT}	4–1–1 (1–0–0)	Jesse Owens Memorial Stadium (697); Columbus, OH
September 27; 6:00 p.m., BTN	No. 20	Michigan; Mack Brady Match	T 0–0 ^{2OT}	4–1–2 (1–0–1)	Jeffrey Field (1,985); State College, PA
October 1; 6:00 p.m., BTN	No. 20	at Michigan State	W 3–0	5–1–2 (2–0–1)	DeMartin Stadium (523); East Lansing, MI
October 6; 1:00 p.m., BTN+	No. 20	No. 8 Indiana	L 1–3	5–2–2 (2–1–1)	Jeffrey Field (925); State College, PA
October 12; 7:00 p.m.	No. 22	Northwestern	W 3–2 ^{OT}	6–2–2 (3–1–1)	Jeffrey Field (953); State College, PA
October 15*; 7:00 p.m.		Pittsburgh; Keystone Clasico	W 3–1	7–2–2	Jeffrey Field (509); State College, PA
October 19; 7:00 p.m.		at Wisconsin	W 2–1	8–2–2 (4–1–1)	Dan McClimon Stadium (425); Madison, WI
October 22*; 7:00 p.m.	No. 19	No. 18 James Madison	T 1–1 (Note: The James Madison match was called off in the 72nd minute due to severe fog. The final scoreline was deemed the final score without an overtime period.)	8–2–3	Jeffrey Field (393); State College, PA
October 25*; 7:00 p.m.	No. 19	Appalachain State	W 4–0	9–2–3	Jeffrey Field (615); State College, PA
October 29*; 6:00 p.m., BTN	No. 16	No. 17 Maryland; Senior Night	W 3–2 ^{OT}	10–2–3 (5–1–1)	Jeffrey Field (657); State College, PA
November 3; 3:00 p.m.	No. 16	at Rutgers	W 2–1 ^{OT}	11–2–3 (6–1–1)	Yurcak Field (1,167); Piscataway, NJ
Big Ten Tournament
November 10; 1:00 p.m., BTN+	(2) No. 13	(7) Wisconsin; Quarterfinals	W 3–0	12–2–3	Jeffrey Field (678); State College, PA
November 15; 4:00 p.m., BTN	(2) No. 13	vs. (3) Michigan; Semifinals	L 0–1	12–3–3	Ludwig Field; College Park, MD
NCAA Tournament
November 24; 5:00 p.m.	(15) No. 13	No. 21 Providence; Second Round	L 2–3 ^{OT}	12–4–3	Jeffrey Field (290); State College, PA
*Non-conference game. ^{#}Rankings from United Soccer Coaches. (#) Tournament seedings in parentheses.

== Rankings ==
Ranking movement Legend: ██ Improvement in ranking. ██ Decrease in ranking. ██ Not ranked the previous week. RV=Others receiving votes.
Poll	Pre	Wk 1	Wk 2	Wk 3	Wk 4	Wk 5	Wk 6	Wk 7	Wk 8	Wk 9	Wk 10	Wk 11	Wk 12	Wk 13	Wk 14	Wk 15	Wk 16	Final
United Soccer	NV	NV	RV						19	16	13	12	13	None Released				18
Top Drawer Soccer	NV	NV	NV	RV														
Soccer America	NV	NV	NV															
CollegeSoccerNews.com	NV	NV	RV															

== 2020 MLS SuperDraft ==
Player	Round	Pick	Position	MLS club	Ref.
Aaron Molloy	1	16	MF	Portland Timbers	
