= 2019 Maryland Terrapins men's soccer team =

American college soccer season

2019 Maryland Terrapins men's soccer

NCAA Tournament, Second Round
- Conference: Big Ten Conference
- TopDrawerSoccer.com: No. 20
- Record: 11–8–2 (3–3–2 Big Ten)
- Head coach: Sasho Cirovski (27th season)
- Assistant coaches: Scott Buete (6th season); Jake Pace (2nd season); Casey Beyers (1st season)
- Home stadium: Ludwig Field

2019 Big Ten Conference men's soccer standings
	Conf.					Overall
Team	W		L		T	W		L		T
No. 9 Indiana ‡	7	–	1	–	0	15	–	3	–	4
No. 18 Penn State +	6	–	1	–	1	12	–	4	–	3
No. 17 Michigan +	4	–	1	–	3	11	–	5	–	6
Maryland +	3	–	3	–	2	11	–	8	–	2
Northwestern	3	–	3	–	2	8	–	8	–	2
Michigan State	3	–	4	–	1	3	–	12	–	3
Wisconsin	1	–	4	–	3	3	–	11	–	4
Rutgers	1	–	6	–	1	7	–	8	–	3
Ohio State	1	–	6	–	1	7	–	11	–	1
‡ – 2019 B1G Tournament champion + – Invited to the 2019 NCAA tournament; As of 17 December 2019; Rankings from United Soccer Coaches; Source: Big Ten

The 2019 Maryland Terrapins men's soccer team represented the University of Maryland, College Park during the 2019 NCAA Division I men's soccer season. It was the 74th season of the university fielding a program. The Terrapins were led by 27th year head coach, Sasho Cirovski.

== Background ==
The Maryland Terrapins entered the 2019 season as the defending national champions, winning their first national title since 2008, their fourth NCAA National title, and their fifth claimed national title. During the regular season, the Terrapins posted a relatively poor record of 7–6–3 overall, and 4–4 in Big Ten play. In the 2018 Big Ten Conference Men's Soccer Tournament, the Terrapins defeated Michigan State in the quarterfinals before losing to Indiana in the semis. Despite this, the Terrapins had a strong Top 20 RPI and earned an at-large berth into the 2018 NCAA Division I Men's Soccer Tournament as an 11 seed, allowing them to earn a second round bye. During their tournament won, they did not concede a single goal, and won all their matches in regulation time. Maryland midfielder, Amar Sejdič and Dayne St. Clair earned the NCAA Division I Men's Soccer Tournament Most Outstanding Player award for offense and defense, respectively.

== Player movement ==
=== Departures ===
Name	Nat.	No.	Pos.	Height	Year	Hometown	Reason for departure
Chase Gasper	USA	28	DF	6 ft 0 in (1.83 m)	RS Senior	Alexandria, VA	Graduated; selected in 2019 MLS SuperDraft by Minnesota United
Donovan Pines	USA	2	DF	6 ft 5 in (1.96 m)	Junior	Clarksville, MD	Signed homegrown contract with D.C. United
Andrew Samuels	USA	13	MF	5 ft 9 in (1.75 m)	Senior	Tampa, FL	Graduated; selected in 2019 MLS SuperDraft by Houston Dynamo
Dayne St. Clair	CAN	99	GK	6 ft 5 in (1.96 m)	Senior	Pickering, ON	Graduated; selected in 2019 MLS SuperDraft by Minnesota United
Amar Sejdič	GER	10	MF	6 ft 1 in (1.85 m)	Senior	Berlin, GER	Graduated; selected in 2019 MLS SuperDraft by Montreal Impact

=== Players arriving ===
Name	Nat.	Hometown	Club	TDS Rating
Ryan Blumberg; DF	AUS	Sydney, NSW	Charlton Athletic	NR
George Campbell; DF	USA	Atlanta, GA	Atlanta United	4/5 stars
Jacob Chakroun; MF	USA	Johns Creek, GA	Kalonji Academy	3/5 stars
Justin Harris; MF	USA	Clarksville, MD	Baltimore Celtic	3/5 stars
Kenneth Hiro Huang; DF	TPE	Tokyo, JPN	Tatung FC	NR
Malcolm Johnston; MF	CAN	Aurora, ON	Vaughan SC	NR
David Kovačić; MF	SVN	Krško, SVN	NK Krško	NR
Isaac Ngobu; DF	USA	Baltimore, MD	Baltimore Celtic	3/5 stars

=== Transfers ===
Name	Nat.	No.	Pos.	Height	Year	Hometown	Notes
Luke Brown	ENG	13	FW		Senior	Cambridgeshire, ENG	Transferred from Hofstra

== Squad information ==
=== Roster ===
As of August 7, 2019

Note: Flags indicate national team as defined under FIFA eligibility rules; some limited exceptions apply. Players may hold more than one non-FIFA nationality.

No.	Pos.	Nation	Player
0	GK	USA	Craig Eichelberger
1	GK	USA	Russell Shealy
3	DF	AUS	Ryan Blumberg
4	DF	CAN	Marques Antoine
5	DF	GER	Johannes Bergmann
6	MF	SVN	David Kovačić
7	FW	KOR	Paul Bin
8	MF	FRA	William James Herve
9	FW	USA	Justin Gielen
10	MF	USA	Eli Crognale
11	MF	CAN	Malcolm Johnston
12	DF	USA	Brett St. Martin
13	FW	ENG	Luke Brown
14	FW	ENG	Louis Spicer

No.	Pos.	Nation	Player
15	FW	USA	Eric Matzelevich
16	MF	USA	Jacob Chakroun
17	DF	TPE	Kenny Hiro
19	FW	USA	Brayan Padilla
20	MF	USA	Justin Harris
22	DF	USA	Nick Richardson
23	DF	USA	Isaac Ngobu
24	MF	USA	Mike Heitzmann
25	DF	USA	Ben Di Rosa
26	FW	USA	Tej Munshi
27	MF	USA	Matt Di Rosa
29	FW	USA	Fola Adetola
30	GK	VEN	Alejandro Chacon
36	GK	GER	Niklas Neumann

=== Coaching staff ===
Front office
Athletic Director	Damon Evans
Deputy Athletic Director	Colleen Sorem
Chief Development Officer	Cheryl Harrison
Assistant Director	Kayley McInerney
Business Operations	Eric Reinke
Coaching staff
Head coach	Sasho Cirovski
Assistant coach	Scott Buete
Assistant coach	Jake Pace
Director of Operations	Miles Vaughn

Last updated: December 1, 2018
Source: UMTerps.com

== Preseason ==
=== Preseason Big Ten poll ===
Maryland was predicted to finish second in the Big Ten Conference.

Coaches' Poll
Predicted finish	Team
1	Indiana
2	Maryland
3	Michigan
4	Michigan State
5	Wisconsin
6	Penn State
7	Northwestern
8	Ohio State
9	Rutgers

== Schedule ==
Date Time, TV	Rank^{#}	Opponent^{#}	Result	Record	Site (Attendance) City, State
Spring season
March 3*; 12:00 p.m.		West Virginia	Postponed		Ludwig Field; College Park, MD
March 31*; 12:00 p.m.		at Philadelphia Union	Cancelled		Talen Energy Stadium Practice Field; Chester, PA
April 5*; 7:00 p.m.		Loudoun United	W 3–1		Ludwig Field; College Park, MD
April 20*; 2:00 p.m.		West Virginia	W 4–2		Ludwig Field; College Park, MD
April 27*; 1:00 p.m.		Bethlehem Steel; Maryland Day	W 2–0		Ludwig Field; College Park, MD
May 4*; 2:00 p.m.		at Army	T 0–0		James Clinton Field; West Point, NY
Preseason
August 18*; 1:00 p.m.	No. 1	Temple	W 3–2		Ludwig Field; College Park, MD
August 24*; 4:00 p.m., WUMC	No. 1	No. 6 North Carolina	L 1–3		Ludwig Field; College Park, MD
Regular season
August 29*; 7:00 p.m., BTN+	No. 1	South Florida	W 1–0	1–0–0	Ludwig Field (0); College Park, MD
September 2*; 6:00 p.m.	No. 1	vs. No. 12 Virginia; Rivalry	L 0–2	1–1–0	Audi Field (1,884); Washington, DC
September 6*; 10:00 p.m., P12N	No. 4	at UCLA	L 2–3	1–2–0	Wallis Annenberg Stadium (1,192); Los Angeles, CA
September 13*; 6:30 p.m., BTN	No. 24	Akron	W 1–0	2–2–0	Ludwig Field (4,403); College Park, MD
September 16*; 7:00 p.m.	No. 25	Villanova	W 1–0	3–2–0	Ludwig Field (2,867); College Park, MD
September 20; 7:00 p.m.	No. 25	Northwestern	L 1–3	3–3–0 (0–1–0)	Ludwig Field (3,992); College Park, MD
September 23*; 7:00 p.m.	No. 25	No. 9 St. John's	W 1–0	4–3–0	Ludwig Field (1,083); College Park, MD
September 27; 8:30 p.m., BTN+		at Wisconsin	T 0–0 ^{2OT}	4–3–1 (0–1–1)	Dan McClimon Stadium (204); Madison, WI
October 2; 7:00 p.m., BTN+		No. 22 Rutgers	W 3–1	5–3–1 (1–1–1)	Ludwig Field (1,003); College Park, MD
October 5*; 7:00 p.m., BTN+		No. 14 Cal State Fullerton	W 2–0	6–3–1	Ludwig Field (2,494); College Park, MD
October 11; 6:30 p.m., BTN	No. 25	at Michigan State	T 1–1 ^{2OT}	6–3–2 (1–1–2)	DeMartin Soccer Complex (1,041); East Lansing, MI
October 14*; 7:00 p.m.	No. 25	No. 12 Georgetown	L 0–1	6–4–2	Ludwig Field (3,000); College Park, MD
October 18; 7:00 p.m., FS2	No. 25	No. 6 Indiana	W 3–0	7–4–2 (2–1–2)	Ludwig Field (4,888); College Park, MD
October 21*; 6:30 p.m., BTN+	No. 25	No. 24 Yale	W 1–0	8–4–2	Ludwig Field (1,081); College Park, MD
October 25; 7:00 p.m.	No. 23	at Ohio State	W 2–0	9–4–2 (3–1–2)	Jesse Owens Memorial Stadium; Columbus, OH
October 29; 6:00 p.m., BTN	No. 17	at No. 16 Penn State	L 2–3	9–5–2 (3–2–2)	Jeffrey Field (657); State College, PA
November 3; 3:00 p.m., ESPNU	No. 17	No. 22 Michigan	L 2–4	9–6–2 (3–3–2)	Ludwig Field (3,128); College Park, MD
Big Ten Tournament
November 10; 2:00 p.m., BTN+	(5) No. 23	at (4) Northwestern; Quarterfinals	W 1–0	10–6–2	Martin Stadium; Evanston, IL
November 15; 2:00 p.m., BTN+	(5) No. 22	(1) No. 8 Indiana; Semifinals	L 0–1 ^{2OT}	10–7–2	Ludwig Field (1,660); College Park, MD
NCAA Tournament
November 21; 7:00 p.m., BTN+		Iona; First Round	W 4–0	11–7–2	Ludwig Field (751); College Park, MD
November 24; 5:00 p.m., ACCNX		at (4) No. 9 Wake Forest; Second Round	L 0–3	11–8–2	Spry Soccer Stadium (1,765); Winston-Salem, NC
*Non-conference game. ^{#}Rankings from United Soccer Coaches. (#) Tournament seedings in parentheses.

== Rankings ==
Ranking movements Legend: ██ Increase in ranking ██ Decrease in ranking — = Not ranked RV = Received votes
	Week														
Poll	Pre	1	2	3	4	5	6	7	8	9	10	11	12	13	Final
United Soccer	1	1	3	24	25	RV	RV	25	25	23	17	23			
Top Drawer Soccer	1	1	1	21	RV	—	—	13	15	7	6	14			
College Soccer News	4	4	3	14	14	25	24	19	18	19	15	21			
Soccer America	7	7	13	21	14	RV	—	22	17	17	16	24			

== Statistics ==
=== Appearances and goals ===
No.	Pos.	Player	Regular season			B1G Tournament			NCAA Tournament			Total		
No.	Pos.	Player	Apps	Goals	Asst.	Apps	Goals	Asst.	Apps	Goals	Asst.	Apps	Goals	Asst.
0	GK	(United States) Craig Eichelberger	0	0	0	0	0	0	0	0	0	0	0	0
1	GK	(United States) Russell Shealy	3+2	0	0	0	0	0	0	0	0	5	0	0
3	DF	(Australia) Ryan Blumberg	0	0	0	0	0	0	0	0	0	0	0	0
4	DF	(Canada) Marques Antoine	3+4	0	0	0	0	0	0	0	0	7	0	0
5	DF	(Germany) Johannes Bergmann	17+0	2	2	1+0	0	0	0	0	0	18	2	2
6	MF	(Slovenia) David Kovačić	8+8	3	1	1+0	0	0	0	0	0	17	3	1
7	FW	(South Korea) Paul Bin	0	0	0	0	0	0	0	0	0	0	0	0
8	MF	(France) William Herve	2+0	0	0	0	0	0	0	0	0	2	0	0
9	FW	(United States) Justin Gielen	10+6	3	1	1+0	0	0	0	0	0	17	3	1
10	MF	(United States) Eli Crognale	15+1	3	5	1+0	1	0	0	0	0	17	4	5
11	MF	(United States) Malcolm Johnston	13+3	3	4	1+0	0	0	0	0	0	17	3	4
12	DF	(United States) Brett St. Martin	16+1	1	1	1+0	0	0	0	0	0	18	1	1
13	FW	(England) Luke Brown	5+10	0	1	0+1	0	0	0	0	0	16	0	1
14	FW	(England) Louis Spicer	0	0	0	0	0	0	0	0	0	0	0	0
15	FW	(United States) Eric Matzelevich	17+0	5	1	1+0	0	0	0	0	0	18	5	1
16	MF	(United States) Jacob Chakroun	0+8	0	0	0+1	0	0	0	0	0	9	0	0
17	DF	(Chinese Taipei) Kenny Hiro	0	0	0	0	0	0	0	0	0	0	0	0
18	MF	(Ukraine) Chris Rindov	0+7	0	1	0	0	0	0	0	0	7	0	1
19	FW	(United States) Brayan Padilla	1+0	0	0	0	0	0	0	0	0	1	0	0
20	MF	(United States) Justin Harris	6+10	0	0	0+1	0	0	0	0	0	17	0	0
22	DF	(United States) Nick Richardson	17+0	0	0	1+0	0	0	0	0	0	18	0	0
23	DF	(United States) Isaac Ngobu	0+3	0	0	0	0	0	0	0	0	3	0	0
24	MF	(United States) Mike Heitzmann	0+10	0	0	0+1	0	0	0	0	0	11	0	0
25	DF	(United States) Ben Di Rosa	17+0	1	2	1+0	0	0	0	0	0	18	1	2
26	FW	(United States) Tej Munshi	0	0	0	0	0	0	0	0	0	0	0	0
27	MF	(United States) Matt Di Rosa	17+0	0	0	1+0	0	0	0	0	0	18	0	0
29	FW	(United States) Fola Adetola	0+9	0	1	0	0	0	0	0	0	9	0	1
30	GK	(Venezuela) Alejandro Chacon	0	0	0	0	0	0	0	0	0	0	0	0
36	GK	(Germany) Niklas Neumann	14+0	0	0	1+0	0	0	0	0	0	15	0	0

=== Discipline ===
No.	Pos.	Player	Regular Season			B1G Tournament			NCAA Tournament			Total		
No.	Pos.	Player	Booked	(yellow card) (yellow-red card)	Sent off (straight red)	Booked	(yellow card) (yellow-red card)	Sent off (straight red)	Booked	(yellow card) (yellow-red card)	Sent off (straight red)	Booked	(yellow card) (yellow-red card)	Sent off (straight red)
0	GK	(United States) Craig Eichelberger	0	0	0	0	0	0	0	0	0	0	0	0
1	GK	(United States) Russell Shealy	0	0	0	0	0	0	0	0	0	0	0	0
3	DF	(Australia) Ryan Blumberg	0	0	0	0	0	0	0	0	0	0	0	0
4	DF	(Canada) Marques Antoine	1	0	0	0	0	0	0	0	0	1	0	0
5	DF	(Germany) Johannes Bergmann	0	0	0	0	0	0	0	0	0	0	0	0
6	MF	(Slovenia) David Kovačić	2	0	0	0	0	0	0	0	0	2	0	0
7	FW	(South Korea) Paul Bin	0	0	0	0	0	0	0	0	0	0	0	0
8	MF	(France) William Herve	0	0	0	0	0	0	0	0	0	0	0	0
9	FW	(United States) Justin Gielen	0	0	0	0	0	0	0	0	0	0	0	0
10	MF	(United States) Eli Crognale	3	0	0	0	0	0	0	0	0	3	0	0
11	MF	(United States) Malcolm Johnston	1	0	1	0	0	0	0	0	0	1	0	1
12	DF	(United States) Brett St. Martin	2	0	0	0	0	0	0	0	0	2	0	0
13	FW	(England) Luke Brown	1	0	0	0	0	0	0	0	0	1	0	0
14	FW	(England) Louis Spicer	0	0	0	0	0	0	0	0	0	0	0	0
15	FW	(United States) Eric Matzelevich	1	0	0	0	0	0	0	0	0	1	0	0
16	MF	(United States) Jacob Chakroun	0	0	0	0	0	0	0	0	0	0	0	0
17	DF	(Chinese Taipei) Kenny Hiro	0	0	0	0	0	0	0	0	0	0	0	0
19	FW	(United States) Brayan Padilla	0	0	0	0	0	0	0	0	0	0	0	0
20	MF	(United States) Justin Harris	0	0	0	0	0	0	0	0	0	0	0	0
22	DF	(United States) Nick Richardson	2	0	0	0	0	0	0	0	0	2	0	0
23	DF	(United States) Isaac Ngobu	0	0	0	0	0	0	0	0	0	0	0	0
24	MF	(United States) Mike Heitzmann	0	0	0	0	0	0	0	0	0	0	0	0
25	DF	(United States) Ben Di Rosa	3	0	0	0	0	0	0	0	0	3	0	0
26	FW	(United States) Tej Munshi	0	0	0	0	0	0	0	0	0	0	0	0
27	MF	(United States) Matt Di Rosa	3	0	0	0	0	0	0	0	0	3	0	0
29	FW	(United States) Fola Adetola	0	0	0	0	0	0	0	0	0	0	0	0
30	GK	(Venezuela) Alejandro Chacon	0	0	0	0	0	0	0	0	0	0	0	0
36	GK	(Germany) Niklas Neumann	0	0	0	0	0	0	0	0	0	0	0	0

=== Summary ===
Competition	P	W	L	T	GF	GA	GD	PCT.	Pts.	Booked	(yellow card) (yellow-red card)	Sent off (straight red)
Regular Season	17	9	6	2	23	18	5	.529	29	20	0	1
Big Ten Tournament	0	0	0	0	0	0	0	.000	0	0	0	0
NCAA Tournament	0	0	0	0	0	0	0	.000	0	0	0	0
Total	17	9	6	2	23	18	5	.529	29	20	0	1

== 2020 MLS SuperDraft ==
No Maryland players were selected in the 2020 MLS SuperDraft.
