= Joshua Penn =

American soccer player (born 2000)

Personal information
- Date of birth: November 25, 2000 (age 25)
- Place of birth: Naperville, Illinois, United States
- Height: 5 ft 11 in (1.80 m)
- Position: Winger

College career
Years	Team	Apps	(Gls)
2019	Indiana Hoosiers	22	(6)

Senior career*
Years	Team	Apps	(Gls)
2019	Indy Eleven	5	(0)
2020	Indy Eleven	0	(0)
2021	Inter Miami	2	(0)
2021	→ Fort Lauderdale CF (loan)	10	(2)
2021	→ Charleston Battery (loan)	16	(1)
2022	Chicago Fire II	20	(7)
2023–2024	Portland Timbers 2	51	(11)

International career^{‡}
2018	United States U19	2	(1)
- * Club domestic league appearances and goals as of November 18, 2024 ‡ National team caps and goals as of March 12, 2019

Joshua Penn (born November 25, 2000) is an American professional soccer player.

== Career ==
On February 21, 2019, Penn joined USL Championship side Indy Eleven on an USL academy contract. He stayed with the club prior to playing college soccer at Indiana University.

Following one season with the Hoosiers, Penn returned to Indy Eleven, signing a professional contract with the club on August 25, 2020.

Penn was eligible for the 2021 MLS SuperDraft and was selected 10th overall by Inter Miami CF on January 21, 2021. On February 12, 2021, he signed with the club after his contract with Indy Eleven was terminated.

On July 30, 2021, Penn joined USL Championship side Charleston Battery on loan for the remainder of the 2021 season.

Following the 2021 season, Penn's contract option was declined by Miami.

On March 8, 2022, Penn signed with Chicago Fire II ahead of their upcoming inaugural season in the MLS Next Pro.

On March 3, 2023, it was announced that Penn had signed with MLS Next Pro side Portland Timbers 2 for their 2023 season. Penn's contract expired following the 2024 season.

== Career statistics ==
=== Club ===
As of match played May 6, 2021

Appearances and goals by club, season and competition
Club	Season	League			Cup		Other		Total	
Club	Season	Division	Apps	Goals	Apps	Goals	Apps	Goals	Apps	Goals
Indy Eleven	2019	USL Championship	5	0	1	0	—	—	6	0
Indy Eleven	2020	USL Championship	0	0	0	0	—	—	0	0
Indy Eleven	Total		5	0	1	0	—	—	6	0
Inter Miami	2021	Major League Soccer	2	0	—	—	—	—	2	0
Inter Miami	Total		2	0	—	—	—	—	2	0
Career total			7	0	1	0	—	—	8	0
