= 2017–18 Charlton Athletic F.C. season =

Charlton Athletic
2017–18 season
- Chairman: Richard Murray
- Manager: Karl Robinson (until 22 March); Lee Bowyer (caretaker) (from 22 March 2018)
- Stadium: The Valley
- League One: 6th (lost in play-off Semi-Final)
- FA Cup: Second round
- EFL Cup: Second round
- EFL Trophy: Third round
- Top goalscorer: League: Josh Magennis (10); All: Josh Magennis (10)
- Highest home attendance: 17,581 (vs. Shrewsbury Town, 24 February 2018)
- Lowest home attendance: 741 (vs. Fulham U21, 1 November 2017)
- Average home league attendance: 11,846
Home colours	Away colours	Third colours

The 2017–18 season was Charlton Athletic's 96th season in their existence. Along with competing in the League One, the club also participated in the FA Cup, EFL Cup and EFL Trophy. The season covered the period from 1 July 2017 to 30 June 2018.

== Kit ==
Sportswear manufacturers Hummel were Kit suppliers, with BETDAQ the front of shirt sponsor.

== Squad statistics ==
As of 13 May 2018

No.	Pos	Nat	Player	Total		League One		League One play-offs		FA Cup		League Cup		EFL Trophy	
No.	Pos	Nat	Player	Apps	Goals	Apps	Goals	Apps	Goals	Apps	Goals	Apps	Goals	Apps	Goals~
1	GK	(England) ENG	Ben Amos (on loan from Bolton Wanderers)	50	0	46+0	0	2+0	0	2+0	0	0+0	0	0+0	0
2	DF	(England) ENG	Lewis Page	8	1	8+0	1	0+0	0	0+0	0	0+0	0	0+0	0
3	MF	(Algeria) ALG	Ahmed Kashi	37	2	33+1	2	1+0	0	0+0	0	0+0	0	2+0	0
4	MF	(England) ENG	Johnnie Jackson	18	0	4+7	0	0+0	0	1+0	0	2+0	0	3+1	0
5	DF	(Germany) GER	Patrick Bauer	37	3	33+1	3	2+0	0	0+0	0	0+0	0	1+0	0
6	DF	(England) ENG	Jason Pearce	29	2	24+1	2	2+0	0	0+0	0	0+1	0	1+0	0
7	MF	(Jamaica) JAM	Mark Marshall	31	2	20+7	1	0+0	0	2+0	1	0+0	0	2+0	0
8	MF	(Wales) WAL	Andrew Crofts	3	0	0+1	0	0+0	0	0+0	0	1+0	0	1+0	0
8	FW	(Republic of Ireland) IRL	Leon Best	7	0	2+3	0	0+0	0	0+1	0	0+0	0	1+0	0
8	FW	(England) ENG	Nicky Ajose	14	1	7+5	1	2+0	0	0+0	0	0+0	0	0+0	0
9	FW	(Northern Ireland) NIR	Josh Magennis	47	10	37+5	10	2+0	0	1+0	0	0+1	0	1+0	0
10	FW	(Republic of Ireland) IRL	Billy Clarke	21	2	16+1	1	0+0	0	0+1	0	1+1	1	1+0	0
11	MF	(England) ENG	Ricky Holmes	26	6	22+1	6	0+0	0	2+0	0	0+0	0	0+1	0
11	MF	(England) ENG	Sullay Kaikai (on loan from Crystal Palace)	15	0	8+6	0	0+1	0	0+0	0	0+0	0	0+0	0
12	MF	(Northern Ireland) NIR	Ben Reeves	36	7	21+8	3	1+0	0	1+0	2	1+0	0	3+1	2
13	GK	(England) ENG	Dillon Phillips	7	0	0+0	0	0+0	0	0+0	0	2+0	0	5+0	0
14	MF	(England) ENG	Tariqe Fosu	35	9	26+4	9	1+1	0	0+1	0	1+0	0	1+0	0
15	DF	(England) ENG	Ezri Konsa	47	0	32+7	0	2+0	0	2+0	0	2+0	0	2+0	0
16	FW	(England) ENG	Stephy Mavididi (on loan from Arsenal)	15	2	6+6	2	1+1	0	0+0	0	0+0	0	0+1	0
17	MF	(Nigeria) NGA	Joe Aribo	36	6	19+7	5	1+1	0	1+0	0	2+0	0	5+0	1
18	FW	(England) ENG	Karlan Ahearne-Grant	31	4	4+18	1	0+0	0	1+1	1	2+0	0	5+0	2
19	MF	(England) ENG	Jake Forster-Caskey	45	5	40+1	5	2+0	0	2+0	0	0+0	0	0+0	0
20	DF	(England) ENG	Chris Solly	28	0	27+0	0	0+0	0	1+0	0	0+0	0	0+0	0
21	FW	(England) ENG	Lee Novak	3	1	1+1	0	0+0	0	0+0	0	1+0	1	0+0	0
21	FW	(Ghana) GHA	Joe Dodoo (on loan from Rangers)	8	2	0+5	1	0+0	0	1+0	0	0+0	0	2+0	1
22	DF	(England) ENG	Jay Dasilva (on loan from Chelsea)	44	0	34+4	0	2+0	0	2+0	0	0+1	0	1+0	0
23	DF	(France) FRA	Naby Sarr	25	0	14+4	0	0+1	0	2+0	0	2+0	0	2+0	0
24	MF	(England) ENG	Regan Charles-Cook	4	1	0+0	0	0+0	0	0+0	0	2+0	1	2+0	0
26	DF	(England) ENG	Harry Lennon	12	0	6+4	0	0+0	0	0+1	0	0+0	0	0+1	0
27	MF	(Poland) POL	Michał Żyro (on loan from Wolves)	14	3	8+5	3	0+1	0	0+0	0	0+0	0	0+0	0
28	FW	(England) ENG	Brandon Hanlan	0	0	0+0	0	0+0	0	0+0	0	0+0	0	0+0	0
30	FW	(Northern Ireland) NIR	Mikhail Kennedy	0	0	0+0	0	0+0	0	0+0	0	0+0	0	0+0	0
31	FW	(England) ENG	Josh Umerah	0	0	0+0	0	0+0	0	0+0	0	0+0	0	0+0	0
32	FW	(Scotland) SCO	Tony Watt	2	0	0+1	0	0+0	0	0+0	0	1+0	0	0+0	0
32	MF	(England) ENG	Matt Carter	1	0	0+0	0	0+0	0	0+0	0	0+0	0	0+1	0
33	DF	(England) ENG	Aaron Barnes	3	0	0+0	0	0+0	0	0+0	0	0+0	0	3+0	0
34	DF	(Netherlands) NED	Anfernee Dijksteel	19	0	8+2	0	1+0	0	1+0	0	2+0	0	5+0	0
35	GK	(Australia) AUS	Ashley Maynard-Brewer	0	0	0+0	0	0+0	0	0+0	0	0+0	0	0+0	0
36	MF	(England) ENG	George Lapslie	5	1	0+1	0	0+0	0	0+0	0	0+0	0	0+4	1
37	FW	(England) ENG	Reeco Hackett-Fairchild	12	2	0+5	0	0+0	0	0+1	0	0+1	0	2+3	2
38	MF	(England) ENG	Taylor Maloney	3	0	0+1	0	0+0	0	0+0	0	0+0	0	0+2	0
39	MF	(England) ENG	Louis-Michel Yamfam	0	0	0+0	0	0+0	0	0+0	0	0+0	0	0+0	0
40	DF	(England) ENG	Jo Cummings	1	0	0+0	0	0+0	0	0+0	0	0+0	0	1+0	0
41	DF	(England) ENG	Jamie Mascoll	3	0	0+0	0	0+0	0	0+0	0	0+0	0	3+0	0

=== Top scorers ===
As of 13 May 2018

Place	Position	Nation	Number	Name	League One	League One play-offs	FA Cup	League Cup	EFL Trophy	Total
1	FW	(Northern Ireland)	9	Josh Magennis	10	0	0	0	0	10
2	MF	(England)	14	Tariqe Fosu	9	0	0	0	0	9
3	MF	(Northern Ireland)	12	Ben Reeves	3	0	2	0	2	7
4	MF	(England)	11	Ricky Holmes	6	0	0	0	0	6
=	MF	(Nigeria)	17	Joe Aribo	5	0	0	0	1	6
6	MF	(England)	19	Jake Forster-Caskey	5	0	0	0	0	5
7	MF	(England)	18	Karlan Ahearne-Grant	1	0	1	0	2	4
8	DF	(Germany)	5	Patrick Bauer	3	0	0	0	0	3
=	MF	(Poland)	24	Michał Żyro	3	0	0	0	0	3
10	FW	(England)	16	Stephy Mavididi	2	0	0	0	0	2
=	MF	(Algeria)	3	Ahmed Kashi	2	0	0	0	0	2
=	DF	(England)	6	Jason Pearce	2	0	0	0	0	2
=	FW	(Jamaica)	7	Mark Marshall	1	0	1	0	0	2
=	FW	(Republic of Ireland)	10	Billy Clarke	1	0	0	1	0	2
=	FW	(Ghana)	21	Joe Dodoo	1	0	0	0	1	2
=	FW	(England)	37	Reeco Hackett-Fairchild	0	0	0	0	2	2
17	DF	(England)	2	Lewis Page	1	0	0	0	0	1
=	FW	(England)	8	Nicky Ajose	1	0	0	0	0	1
=	MF	(England)	24	Regan Charles-Cook	0	0	0	1	0	1
=	FW	(England)	21	Lee Novak	0	0	0	1	0	1
=	MF	(England)	36	George Lapslie	0	0	0	0	1	1
Own goals					2	0	0	0	0	2
Totals					58	0	4	3	9	74

=== Disciplinary record ===
As of 13 May 2018

Number	Nation	Position	Name	League One		League One play-offs		FA Cup		League Cup		EFL Trophy		Total	
Number	Nation	Position	Name	Booked	Sent off (straight red)	Booked	Sent off (straight red)	Booked	Sent off (straight red)	Booked	Sent off (straight red)	Booked	Sent off (straight red)	Booked	Sent off (straight red)
19	(England)	MF	Jake Forster-Caskey	11	0	0	0	0	0	0	0	0	0	11	0
3	(Algeria)	MF	Ahmed Kashi	10	0	0	0	0	0	0	0	0	0	10	0
20	(England)	DF	Chris Solly	7	0	0	0	1	0	0	0	0	0	8	0
15	(England)	DF	Ezri Konsa	6	0	0	0	1	0	0	0	0	0	7	0
11	(England)	MF	Ricky Holmes	6	0	0	0	0	0	0	0	0	0	6	0
5	(Germany)	DF	Patrick Bauer	5	0	1	0	0	0	0	0	0	0	6	0
9	(Northern Ireland)	FW	Josh Magennis	5	0	0	0	0	0	0	0	0	0	5	0
23	(France)	DF	Naby Sarr	4	0	0	0	0	0	0	0	0	0	4	0
6	(England)	DF	Jason Pearce	4	0	0	0	0	0	0	0	0	0	4	0
1	(England)	GK	Ben Amos	3	0	0	0	1	0	0	0	0	0	4	0
26	(England)	DF	Harry Lennon	3	0	0	0	0	0	0	0	0	0	3	0
10	(Republic of Ireland)	FW	Billy Clarke	2	0	0	0	0	0	0	0	0	0	2	0
14	(England)	MF	Tariqe Fosu	2	0	0	0	0	0	0	0	0	0	2	0
11	(England)	FW	Sullay Kaikai	2	0	0	0	0	0	0	0	0	0	2	0
22	(England)	DF	Jay Dasilva	2	0	0	0	0	0	0	0	0	0	2	0
21	(Ghana)	FW	Joe Dodoo	1	0	0	0	0	0	0	0	0	0	1	0
7	(Jamaica)	MF	Mark Marshall	1	0	0	0	0	0	0	0	0	0	1	0
16	(England)	FW	Stephy Mavididi	1	0	0	0	0	0	0	0	0	0	1	0
34	(Netherlands)	DF	Anfernee Dijksteel	1	0	0	0	0	0	0	0	0	0	1	0
12	(Northern Ireland)	MF	Ben Reeves	1	0	0	0	0	0	0	0	0	0	1	0
27	(Poland)	MF	Michał Żyro	1	0	0	0	0	0	0	0	0	0	1	0
2	(England)	DF	Lewis Page	1	0	0	0	0	0	0	0	0	0	1	0
21	(England)	FW	Lee Novak	0	1	0	0	0	0	0	0	0	0	0	1
8	(Wales)	MF	Andrew Crofts	0	0	0	0	0	0	0	1	0	0	0	1
24	(England)	MF	Regan Charles-Cook	0	0	0	0	0	0	1	0	0	0	1	0
Totals				79	1	1	0	3	0	1	1	0	0	84	2

== Transfers ==
=== Transfers in ===
Date from	Position	Nationality	Name	From	Fee	Ref.
1 July 2017	CB	(Australia)	Ryan Blumberg	Nike Football Academy	Free transfer	
1 July 2017	SS	(Republic of Ireland)	Billy Clarke	Bradford City	Undisclosed	
1 July 2017	LW	(England)	Tariqe Fosu	Reading	Undisclosed	
1 July 2017	LW	(Jamaica)	Mark Marshall	Bradford City	Free transfer	
3 August 2017	CM	(Northern Ireland)	Ben Reeves	Milton Keynes Dons	Free transfer	
21 August 2017	FB	(England)	Jamie Mascoll	Dulwich Hamlet	Free transfer	
28 November 2017	CF	(Republic of Ireland)	Leon Best	Ipswich Town	Free transfer	

=== Transfers out ===
Date from	Position	Nationality	Name	To	Fee	Ref.
1 July 2017	LB	(Zimbabwe)	Adam Chicksen	Bradford City	Released	(Note: Adam Chicksen joined Bradford City following his release.)
1 July 2017	CB	(England)	Roger Johnson	Bromley	Released	(Note: Roger Johnson joined Bromley following his release.)
1 July 2017	CF	(England)	Chris Millar	Free agent	Released	
1 July 2017	GK	(Bulgaria)	Dimitar Mitov	Cambridge United	Released	(Note: Dimitar Mitov joined Cambridge United following his release.)
1 July 2017	CB	(England)	Terell Thomas	Wigan Athletic	Released	(Note: Terell Thomas joined Wigan Athletic following his release.)
15 July 2017	CB	(Portugal)	Jorge Teixeira	Sint-Truiden	Undisclosed	
19 July 2017	LW	(Spain)	Cristian Ceballos	Sint-Truiden	Undisclosed	
14 August 2017	CF	(Scotland)	Tony Watt	OH Leuven	Undisclosed	
31 August 2017	CF	(England)	Lee Novak	Scunthorpe United	Undisclosed	
31 August 2017	CM	(Wales)	Andrew Crofts	Scunthorpe United	Released	(Note: Andrew Crofts joined Scunthorpe United following his release.)
15 January 2018	LW	(England)	Ricky Holmes	Sheffield United	Undisclosed	
31 January 2018	FB	(England)	Aaron Barnes	Colchester United	Free transfer	

=== Loans in ===
Date from	Position	Nationality	Name	From	Date until	Ref.
21 July 2017	LB	(England)	Jay Dasilva	Chelsea	30 June 2018	
29 July 2017	GK	(England)	Ben Amos	Bolton Wanderers	30 June 2018	
31 August 2017	FW	(Ghana)	Joe Dodoo	Rangers	1 January 2018	
3 January 2018	FW	(England)	Stephy Mavididi	Arsenal	30 June 2018	
22 January 2018	RW	(Poland)	Michał Żyro	Wolverhampton Wanderers	30 June 2018	
26 January 2018	LW	(England)	Sullay Kaikai	Crystal Palace	30 June 2018	

=== Loans out ===
Start date	Position	Nationality	Name	To	End date	Ref.
1 July 2017	CF	(Angola)	Igor Vetokele	Sint-Truiden	30 June 2018	
14 July 2017	CF	(England)	Nicky Ajose	Bury	1 February 2018	
25 August 2017	GK	(England)	Jordan Beeney	Dartford	23 September 2017	
29 August 2017	CF	(England)	Josh Umerah	Wycombe Wanderers	15 January 2018	
31 August 2017	CF	(England)	Brandon Hanlan	Colchester United	14 January 2018	
1 September 2017	RW	(England)	Regan Charles-Cook	Woking	6 January 2018	
27 October 2017	LB	(England)	Archie Edwards	Bognor Regis Town	1 January 2018	
10 November 2017	GK	(England)	Jordan Beeney	Farnborough	8 December 2017	
12 January 2018	LB	(England)	Aaron Barnes	Torquay United	31 January 2018	
25 January 2018	LB	(England)	Archie Edwards	Eastbourne Borough	28 April 2018	
30 January 2018	FW	(England)	Karlan Ahearne-Grant	Crawley Town	30 June 2018	
1 February 2018	CF	(England)	Brandon Hanlan	Bromley	30 June 2018	
2 February 2018	CM	(England)	George Lapslie	Chelmsford City	2 March 2018	
8 March 2018	RW	(England)	Regan Charles-Cook	Woking	28 April 2018	
7 April 2018	CB	(Antigua and Barbuda)	Daniel Bowry	Kingstonian	28 April 2018	

== Competitions ==
=== Friendlies ===
On 10 May 2017, Charlton Athletic announced Ipswich Town would visit during pre-season. Opposition number two and three were announced on 15 May 2017, Welling United and Greenwich Borough. A day later, Charlton confirmed a trip to Dover Athletic to the pre-season schedule. On 18 May 2017, Charlton announced they would visit Republic of Ireland as part of their pre-season preparations. Two more friendlies were revealed a day later.

10 July 2017	Crumlin United (Republic of Ireland)	0–5	Charlton Athletic	Dublin, Ireland
19:45 IST		Report	Watt 20', 34'; Quinn (og) 33'; Holmes 73'; Magennis 85'	Stadium: Richmond Park

11 July 2017	Limerick (Republic of Ireland)	3–2	Charlton Athletic	Garryowen, Ireland
19:45 IST	Kenny 48'; Tracy 56'; Ogbene 79'	Report	Aribo 20'; Magennis 29'	Stadium: Markets Field; Referee: Graham Kelly

12 July 2017	UCD (Republic of Ireland)	4–1	Charlton Athletic	Dún Laoghaire–Rathdown, Ireland
19:45 IST	Hanrahan 12'; McClelland 34', 40'; R. Manley 81'	Report	Ahearne-Grant 86'	Stadium: UCD Bowl

15 July 2017	Welling United	0–3	Charlton Athletic	Welling
15:00 BST		Report	Pearce 25'; Bauer 41'; Kennedy 87'	Stadium: Park View Road; Attendance: 1,370; Referee: Ian Fissenden

15 July 2017	Greenwich Borough	0–4	Charlton Athletic	Eltham
19:30 BST		Report	Hackett-Fairchild 11'; Ceballos 15'; Marshall 32'; Clarke 53'	Stadium: Badgers Sports Ground; Referee: Lee Dyson

18 July 2017	Dover Athletic	0–2	Charlton Athletic	Dover
19:45 BST		Report	Forster-Caskey 40'; Hackett-Fairchild 90'	Stadium: Crabble Athletic Ground; Attendance: 835; Referee: C. Brooke

22 July 2017	Stevenage	1–2	Charlton Athletic	Stevenage
15:00 BST	Franks 35'	Report	Ahearne-Grant 40'; Forster-Caskey 56'	Stadium: Lamex Stadium; Referee: D. Deadman

25 July 2017	Charlton Athletic	0–2	Norwich City	Charlton
19:45 BST		Report	Wildschut 34'; Naismith 55'	Stadium: The Valley; Attendance: 2,650; Referee: D. Rock

29 July 2017	Charlton Athletic	6–1	Ipswich Town	Charlton
15:00 BST	Bauer 11'; Fosu 27'; Magennis 31', 39'; Holmes 51', 77'	Report	Dozzell 73'	Stadium: The Valley; Attendance: 2,297; Referee: Gavin Ward

10 November 2017	Queens Park Rangers	2–2	Charlton Athletic	Shepherd's Bush
12:00 GMT	Smith 27', 35'	Report	Best 2'; Dodoo 75'	Stadium: Loftus Road; Attendance: 0

=== League One ===
==== League table ====
Pos	Team	Pld	W	D	L	GF	GA	GD	Pts	Promotion, qualification or relegation
4	Rotherham United (O, P)	46	24	7	15	73	53	+20	79	Qualification for League One play-offs (Note: Four teams play for one spot and promotion to the EFL Championship.)
5	Scunthorpe United	46	19	17	10	65	50	+15	74	Qualification for League One play-offs
6	Charlton Athletic	46	20	11	15	58	51	+7	71	Qualification for League One play-offs
7	Plymouth Argyle	46	19	11	16	58	59	−1	68	
8	Portsmouth	46	20	6	20	57	56	+1	66	

Source: BBC Sport
Rules for classification: 1) Points; 2) Goal difference; 3) Number of goals scored
(O) Play-off winners; (P) Promoted

==== Result summary ====
Overall								Home						Away					
Pld	W	D	L	GF	GA	GD	Pts	W	D	L	GF	GA	GD	W	D	L	GF	GA	GD
46	20	11	15	58	51	+7	71	11	6	6	31	24	+7	9	5	9	27	27	0

Last updated: 13 May 2018.

==== Results by round ====
Round	1	2	3	4	5	6	7	8	9	10	11	12	13	14	15	16	17	18	19	20	21	22	23	24	25	26	27	28	29	30	31	32	33	34	35	36	37	38	39	40	41	42	43	44	45	46
Ground	H	A	H	A	A	H	H	A	H	A	A	H	A	A	H	H	H	A	H	H	A	H	A	A	H	H	A	H	H	A	H	A	H	A	A	H	H	A	H	A	A	H	A	A	H	A
Result	W	L	W	W	W	W	L	L	D	D	W	W	D	W	W	D	W	L	D	L	L	D	L	D	L	W	W	W	L	D	D	W	L	L	L	D	W	W	W	D	L	L	W	W	W	L
Position	8	13	6	4	3	2	3	7	7	7	5	5	5	4	4	5	4	6	6	6	6	6	9	9	9	8	6	7	7	7	7	6	7	8	8	9	8	8	6	6	6	8	5	5	6	6

Updated to match(es) played on 13 May 2018. Source:
A = Away; H = Home; W = Win; D = Draw; L = Loss

==== Matches ====
5 August 2017 1	Charlton Athletic	1–0	Bristol Rovers	Charlton
15:00 BST	Bauer 38'	Report		Stadium: The Valley; Attendance: 12,968; Referee: Chris Sarginson

12 August 2017 2	Plymouth Argyle	2–0	Charlton Athletic	Plymouth
15:00 BST	Jervis 53', 87'	Report		Stadium: Home Park; Attendance: 11,178; Referee: John Brooks

19 August 2017 3	Charlton Athletic	4–1	Northampton Town	Charlton
15:00 BST	Magennis 2'; Holmes 61'; Forster-Caskey 90+4', 90+7'	Report	Richards 79'	Stadium: The Valley; Attendance: 11,289; Referee: Kevin Johnson

26 August 2017 4	Rotherham United	0–2	Charlton Athletic	Rotherham
15:00 BST		Report	Bauer 16'; Magennis 66'	Stadium: New York Stadium; Attendance: 7,976; Referee: Trevor Kettle

2 September 2017 5	Oldham Athletic	3–4	Charlton Athletic	Oldham
15:00 BST	Davies 34' (pen.); Doyle 51'; Byrne 82'	Report	Holmes 18'; Fosu 21'; Clarke 62'; Dodoo 72'	Stadium: Boundary Park; Attendance: 3,592; Referee: Ross Joyce

9 September 2017 6	Charlton Athletic	2–1	Southend United	Charlton
15:00 BST	Magennis 65'; Holmes 68'	Report	White 78'	Stadium: The Valley; Attendance: 12,229; Referee: Christopher Ward

12 September 2017 7	Charlton Athletic	0–3	Wigan Athletic	Charlton
19:45 BST		Report	Massey 44', 70'; Morsy 87'	Stadium: The Valley; Attendance: 10,172; Referee: Charles Breakspear

16 September 2017 8	Gillingham	1–0	Charlton Athletic	Gillingham
15:00 BST	Eaves 54'	Report		Stadium: Priestfield Stadium; Attendance: 7,216; Referee: Graham Salisbury

23 September 2017 9	Charlton Athletic	1–1	Bury	Charlton
15:00 BST	Magennis 39'	Report	Beckford 9'	Stadium: The Valley; Attendance: 9,895; Referee: Dean Whitestone

26 September 2017 10	Walsall	2–2	Charlton Athletic	Walsall
19:45 BST	Roberts 41'; Agyei 89'	Report	Fosu 44'; Holmes 88'	Stadium: Bescot Stadium; Attendance: 3,712; Referee: Carl Boyeson

30 September 2017 11	Fleetwood Town	1–3	Charlton Athletic	Fleetwood
15:00 BST	Grant 25'	Report	Fosu 13', 39', 71'	Stadium: Highbury Stadium; Attendance: 3,009; Referee: Seb Stockbridge

7 October 2017 P	Charlton Athletic	v	Peterborough United	Charlton
15:00 BST				Stadium: The Valley
Note: On 28 September, the home fixture versus Peterborough United was postponed due to international call-ups.

14 October 2017 12	Charlton Athletic	1–0	Doncaster Rovers	Charlton
15:00 BST	Fosu 9'	Report		Stadium: The Valley; Attendance: 10,917; Referee: Robert Lewis

17 October 2017 13	Oxford United	1–1	Charlton Athletic	Oxford
19:45 BST	Ribeiro 35'	Report	Fosu 18'	Stadium: Kassam Stadium; Attendance: 7,070; Referee: Charles Breakspear

21 October 2017 14	Bradford City	0–1	Charlton Athletic	Bradford
15:00 BST		Report	Forster-Caskey 72'	Stadium: Valley Parade; Attendance: 20,066; Referee: Darren Bond

28 October 2017 15	Charlton Athletic	1–0	AFC Wimbledon	Charlton
15:00 BST	Holmes 78'	Report		Stadium: The Valley; Attendance: 12,575; Referee: Ben Toner

11 November 2017 P	Shrewsbury Town	v	Charlton Athletic	Shrewsbury
15:00 GMT				Stadium: New Meadow
Note: On 2 November, the away fixture versus Shrewsbury Town was postponed due to international call-ups.

18 November 2017 16	Charlton Athletic	2–2	Milton Keynes Dons	Charlton
15:00 GMT	Magennis 6'; Golbourne 87' (o.g.)	Report	Agard 63', 90+1' (pen.)	Stadium: The Valley; Attendance: 10,557; Referee: Andy Woolmer

18 November 2017 17	Charlton Athletic	2–1	Rochdale	Charlton
19:45 GMT	Forster-Caskey 35', 60'	Report	Gillam 13'	Stadium: The Valley; Attendance: 8,801; Referee: Charles Breakspear

25 November 2017 18	Scunthorpe United	2–0	Charlton Athletic	Scunthorpe
15:00 GMT	Morris 60', 63'	Report		Stadium: Glanford Park; Attendance: 4,307; Referee: Kevin Johnson

28 November 2017 19	Charlton Athletic	2–2	Peterborough United	Charlton
19:45 GMT	Holmes 90+1' (pen.); Ahearne-Grant 90+4'	Report	Edwards 11'; Marriott 58'	Stadium: The Valley; Attendance: 9,532; Referee: John Brooks

9 December 2017 20	Charlton Athletic	0–1	Portsmouth	Charlton
15:00 GMT		Report	Magennis 47' (o.g.)	Stadium: The Valley; Attendance: 16,361; Referee: Andrew Madley

16 December 2017 21	Blackburn Rovers	2–0	Charlton Athletic	Blackburn
15:00 GMT	Best 30' (o.g.); Graham 90+4'	Report		Stadium: Ewood Park; Attendance: 10,907; Referee: Geoff Eltringham

23 December 2017 22	Charlton Athletic	1–1	Blackpool	Charlton
15:00 GMT	Aribo 15'	Report	Gnanduillet 90+1'	Stadium: The Valley; Attendance: 10,172; Referee: John Busby

26 December 2017 23	Southend United	3–1	Charlton Athletic	Southend
13:00 GMT	Cox 2', 79'; Turner 11'	Report	Reeves 66'	Stadium: Roots Hall; Attendance: 9,588; Referee: Darren Drysdale

29 December 2017 24	Wigan Athletic	0–0	Charlton Athletic	Wigan
19:45 GMT		Report		Stadium: DW Stadium; Attendance: 9,297; Referee: Trevor Kettle

1 January 2018 25	Charlton Athletic	1–2	Gillingham	Charlton
15:00 GMT	Aribo 83'	Report	Parker 11'; Eaves 32'	Stadium: The Valley; Attendance: 11,979; Referee: Oliver Langford

6 January 2018 26	Charlton Athletic	1–0	Oldham Athletic	Charlton
15:00 GMT	Mavididi 27'	Report		Stadium: The Valley; Attendance: 9,972; Referee: Lee Swabey

13 January 2018 27	Bury	0–1	Charlton Athletic	Bury
15:00 GMT		Report	Marshall 63'	Stadium: Gigg Lane; Attendance: 3,295; Referee: Michael Salisbury

20 January 2018 28	Charlton Athletic	3–1	Walsall	Charlton
15:00 GMT	Aribo 31'; Roberts 73' (o.g.); Mavididi 89'	Report	Oztumer 41'	Stadium: The Valley; Attendance: 10,140; Referee: Scott Oldham

23 January 2018 P	Shrewsbury Town	v	Charlton Athletic	Shrewsbury
19:45 GMT				Stadium: New Meadow
Note: On 11 January, the away fixture versus Shrewsbury Town was postponed again due to Shrewsbury Town's EFL Trophy Round Four match Vs. Oldham Athletic.

27 January 2018 P	Blackpool	v	Charlton Athletic	Blackpool
15:00 GMT				Stadium: Bloomfield Road
Note: On 27 January at 2pm, the away fixture versus Blackpool was postponed due to a waterlogged pitch.

3 February 2018 29	Charlton Athletic	2–3	Oxford United	Charlton
15:00 GMT	Kashi 63'; Magennis 78'	Report	Henry 76'; Kane 89'; Ledson 90+4'	Stadium: The Valley; Attendance: 11,747; Referee: Keith Stroud

10 February 2018 30	Doncaster Rovers	1–1	Charlton Athletic	Doncaster
15:00 GMT	Blair 90+4'	Report	Bauer 18'	Stadium: Keepmoat Stadium; Attendance: 7,797; Referee: Mark Heywood

13 February 2018 31	Charlton Athletic	1–1	Bradford City	Charlton
19:45 GMT	Magennis 24'	Report	Robinson 80'	Stadium: The Valley; Attendance: 10,650; Referee: Nick Kinseley

17 February 2018 32	Milton Keynes Dons	1–2	Charlton Athletic	Milton Keynes
15:00 GMT	Agard 62'	Report	Kashi 10'; Magennis 60'	Stadium: Stadium mk Attendance: 8,961; Referee: Roger East

24 February 2018 33	Charlton Athletic	0–2	Shrewsbury Town	Charlton
15:00 GMT		Report	Rodman 52'; Beckles 67'	Stadium: The Valley; Attendance: 17,581; Referee: Chris Sarginson

3 March 2018 P	AFC Wimbledon	v	Charlton Athletic	Kingston upon Thames
15:00 GMT				Stadium: Kingsmeadow
Note: On 2 March at 12pm, the away fixture versus AFC Wimbledon was postponed due to a frozen pitch.

10 March 2018 34	Peterborough United	4–1	Charlton Athletic	Peterborough
15:00 GMT	Hughes 44'; Maddison 58' (pen.); Marriott 81', 84'	Report	Żyro 73'	Stadium: London Road Stadium; Attendance: 6,337; Referee: Brett Huxtable

13 March 2018 35	Blackpool	1–0	Charlton Athletic	Blackpool
19:45 GMT	Ryan 90+1'	Report		Stadium: Bloomfield Road; Attendance: 3,216; Referee: Trevor Kettle

17 March 2018 36	Charlton Athletic	0–0	Fleetwood Town	Charlton
15:00 GMT		Report		Stadium: The Valley; Attendance: 9,865; Referee: Mark Heywood

24 March 2018 37	Charlton Athletic	2–0	Plymouth Argyle	Charlton
15:00 GMT	Page 3'; Żyro 17'	Report		Stadium: The Valley; Attendance: 13,989; Referee: John Busby

30 March 2018 38	Northampton Town	0–4	Charlton Athletic	Northampton
15:00 BST		Report	Reeves 14'; Fosu 19', 51'; Magennis 79'	Stadium: Sixfields Stadium; Attendance: 6,416; Referee: Gavin Ward

2 April 2018 39	Charlton Athletic	3–1	Rotherham United	Charlton
15:00 BST	Żyro 28'; Aribo 54', 65'	Report	Wood 77'	Stadium: The Valley; Attendance: 11,871; Referee: Graham Horwood

7 April 2018 40	Bristol Rovers	1–1	Charlton Athletic	Bristol
15:00 BST	Bennett 21'	Report	Reeves 45'	Stadium: Memorial Stadium; Attendance: 9,336; Referee: Andy Davies

10 April 2018 41	AFC Wimbledon	1–0	Charlton Athletic	Kingston upon Thames
19:45 BST	Taylor 45+1'	Report		Stadium: Kingsmeadow; Attendance: 4,457; Referee: Craig Hicks

14 April 2018 42	Charlton Athletic	0–1	Scunthorpe United	Charlton
15:00 BST		Report	Toney 31'	Stadium: The Valley; Attendance: 11,877; Referee: Graham Salisbury

17 April 2018 43	Shrewsbury Town	0–2	Charlton Athletic	Shrewsbury
19:45 BST		Report	Pearce 74'; Magennis 90+8'	Stadium: New Meadow; Attendance: 5,839; Referee: Darren Handley

21 April 2018 44	Portsmouth	0–1	Charlton Athletic	Portsmouth
15:00 BST		Report	Ajose 40'	Stadium: Fratton Park; Attendance: 19,210; Referee: Mark Heywood

28 April 2018 45	Charlton Athletic	1–0	Blackburn Rovers	Charlton
15:00 BST	Pearce 19'	Report		Stadium: The Valley; Attendance: 17,310; Referee: Robert Jones

5 May 2018 46	Rochdale	1–0	Charlton Athletic	Rochdale
17:30 BST	Thompson 69'	Report		Stadium: Spotland Stadium; Attendance: 5,294; Referee: Tony Harrington

=== League One play-offs ===
10 May 2018 Semi-Final First Leg	Charlton Athletic	0–1	Shrewsbury Town	Charlton
19:45 BST		Report	Nolan 80'	Stadium: The Valley; Attendance: 14,367; Referee: Simon Hooper

13 May 2018 Semi-Final Second Leg	Shrewsbury Town	1–0 (2–0 agg.)	Charlton Athletic	Shrewsbury
17:15 BST	Morris 58'	Report		Stadium: New Meadow; Attendance: 9,016; Referee: Jeremy Simpson

=== FA Cup ===
On 16 October 2017, Charlton Athletic were drawn at home to Truro City in the first round. A trip to AFC Wimbledon was confirmed for the second round.

5 November 2017 First round	Charlton Athletic	3–1	Truro City	Charlton
14:00 GMT	Reeves 10', 70'; Marshall 53'	Report	Harvey 59'	Stadium: The Valley; Attendance: 4,494; Referee: Dean Whitestone

3 December 2017 Second round	AFC Wimbledon	3–1	Charlton Athletic	Kingston upon Thames
14:00 GMT	McDonald 10'; Taylor 70', 81' (pen.)	Report	Ahearne-Grant 22'	Stadium: Kingsmeadow; Attendance: 3,270; Referee: James Linington

=== EFL Cup ===
On 16 June 2017, Charlton Athletic were drawn away to Exeter City in the first round. Another away tie against Norwich City was confirmed for the second round.

8 August 2017 First round	Exeter City	1–2	Charlton Athletic	Exeter
19:45 BST	Holmes 54'	Report	Clarke 72'; Charles-Cook 79'	Stadium: St James Park; Attendance: 2,699; Referee: Tim Robinson

22 August 2017 Second round	Norwich City	4–1	Charlton Athletic	Norwich
19:45 BST	Murphy 21', 52'; Watkins 74'; Trybull 89'	Report	Novak 5'	Stadium: Carrow Road; Attendance: 12,521; Referee: Andy Haines

=== EFL Trophy ===
Pos	Lge	Team	Pld	W	PW	PL	L	GF	GA	GD	Pts	Qualification
1	L1	Portsmouth (Q)	3	2	0	1	0	7	4	+3	7	Round 2
2	L1	Charlton Athletic (Q)	3	2	0	0	1	5	3	+2	6	Round 2
3	ACA	Fulham U21 (E)	3	1	1	0	1	8	7	+1	5	
4	L2	Crawley Town (E)	3	0	0	0	3	2	8	−6	0	

Updated to match(es) played on 7 November 2017. Source: EFL.com
(E) Eliminated; (Q) Qualified to the phase indicated

29 August 2017 Group stage 1	Crawley Town	0–2	Charlton Athletic	Crawley
19:45 BST		Report	Reeves 37'; Lapslie 70'	Stadium: Checkatrade.com Stadium; Attendance: 1,666; Referee: N Kinseley

1 November 2017 Group stage 2	Charlton Athletic	3–2	Fulham U21	Charlton
19:45 BST	Reeves 30'; Dodoo 88'; Aribo 90'	Report	Þorsteinsson 4'; Thompson 63'	Stadium: The Valley; Attendance: 741; Referee: C Hicks

7 November 2017 Group stage 3	Charlton Athletic	0–1	Portsmouth	Charlton
19:45 BST		Report	Main 20'	Stadium: The Valley; Attendance: 1,307; Referee: Nicholas Kinseley

5 December 2017 Second round	Swansea City U21	2–3	Charlton Athletic	Swansea
19:00 GMT	Gorré 9'; Garrick 41'	Report	Hackett-Fairchild 16', 51'; Ahearne-Grant 70'	Stadium: Liberty Stadium; Attendance: 410; Referee: L Swabey

9 January 2018 Third round	Charlton Athletic	1–1 (0–3 p)	Oxford United	Charlton
19:45 GMT	Ahearne-Grant 7'	Report	Thomas 54'	Stadium: The Valley; Attendance: 1,146; Referee: A Haines
	Penalties
	Jackson (penalty missed); Mavididi (penalty missed); Hackett-Fairchild (penalty missed)		Mowatt (penalty scored); Obika (penalty scored); Ledson (penalty missed); Mehmeti (penalty scored)

=== Kent Senior Cup ===
20 September 2017 Second round	Welling United	0–1	Charlton Athletic	Welling
19:45 BST		Report	Sarr 90+3'	Stadium: Park View Road; Attendance: 154; Referee: J Stokes

20 December 2017 Quarter-Final	Cray Wanderers	1–5	Charlton Athletic	Bromley
19:45 GMT	Adesite 60' (pen.)	Report	Morgan 18' (pen.); Sarpong-Wiredu 32'; Doughty 52'; Cummings 62'; Lapslie 90'	Stadium: Hayes Lane; Attendance: 152; Referee: Aji Ajibola

14 March 2018 Semi-Final	Folkestone Invicta	2–1	Charlton Athletic	Folkestone
19:45 GMT	Ter Horst 36'; McCann 83'	Report	Morgan 23'	Stadium: Fullicks Stadium; Attendance: 403; Referee: Lee Dyson
