= 2018–19 Charlton Athletic F.C. season =

Charlton Athletic
2018–19 season
- Chairman: Richard Murray
- Manager: Lee Bowyer (caretaker until 6 September, permanent manager thereafter)
- Stadium: The Valley
- League One: 3rd (Promoted via play-offs)
- Play-Offs: Winners
- FA Cup: Second round (vs. Doncaster Rovers)
- EFL Cup: First round (vs. Milton Keynes Dons)
- EFL Trophy: Group stage
- Top goalscorer: League: Lyle Taylor (21); All: Lyle Taylor (25)
- Highest home attendance: 25,428 (vs. Doncaster Rovers, 17 May 2019)
- Lowest home attendance: 740 (vs. Swansea City U21, 13 November 2018)
- Average home league attendance: 11,827
Home colours	Away colours	Third colours

The 2018–19 season was Charlton Athletic's 113th season in their existence. Along with competing in the League One, the club also participated in the FA Cup, EFL Cup and EFL Trophy. The season covered the period from 1 July 2018 to 30 June 2019.

== Kit ==
Sportswear manufacturers Hummel were Kit suppliers, with BETDAQ the front of shirt sponsor.

== Squad statistics ==
As of 26 May 2019

No.	Pos	Nat	Player	Total		League One		League One play-offs		FA Cup		League Cup		EFL Trophy	
No.	Pos	Nat	Player	Apps	Goals	Apps	Goals	Apps	Goals	Apps	Goals	Apps	Goals	Apps	Goals
1	GK	(England) ENG	Dillon Phillips	35	0	27+0	0	3+0	0	3+0	0	1+0	0	1+0	0
2	DF	(Netherlands) NED	Anfernee Dijksteel	39	1	21+9	1	3+0	0	3+0	0	1+0	0	2+0	0
3	DF	(England) ENG	Lewis Page	11	0	11+0	0	0+0	0	0+0	0	0+0	0	0+0	0
4	DF	(Poland) POL	Krystian Bielik (on loan from Arsenal)	34	4	30+1	3	3+0	1	0+0	0	0+0	0	0+0	0
5	DF	(Germany) GER	Patrick Bauer	39	1	35+0	0	3+0	1	1+0	0	0+0	0	0+0	0
6	DF	(England) ENG	Jason Pearce	28	2	25+1	2	0+2	0	0+0	0	0+0	0	0+0	0
7	MF	(Jamaica) JAM	Mark Marshall	29	2	6+16	1	0+0	0	2+1	1	1+0	0	3+0	0
8	MF	(England) ENG	Jake Forster-Caskey	1	0	0+1	0	0+0	0	0+0	0	0+0	0	0+0	0
9	FW	(Montserrat) MSR	Lyle Taylor	45	25	41+0	21	3+0	1	1+0	3	0+0	0	0+0	0
10	FW	(Republic of Ireland) IRL	Billy Clarke	4	0	0+0	0	0+0	0	2+1	0	0+0	0	1+0	0
10	FW	(Antigua and Barbuda) ANT	Josh Parker	13	0	3+7	0	3+0	0	0+0	0	0+0	0	0+0	0
11	MF	(England) ENG	Tariqe Fosu	30	2	14+13	2	0+0	0	1+1	0	0+0	0	1+0	0
12	MF	(Northern Ireland) NIR	Ben Reeves	32	4	22+7	4	0+0	0	1+0	0	0+0	0	1+1	0
14	FW	(Angola) ANG	Igor Vetokele	25	5	12+11	3	0+0	0	0+0	0	0+0	0	2+0	2
15	MF	(England) ENG	Darren Pratley	34	4	20+8	2	1+2	1	2+0	0	0+0	0	1+0	1
16	MF	(Northern Ireland) NIR	Jamie Ward (on loan from Nottingham Forest)	11	1	6+3	1	0+0	0	1+0	0	0+0	0	1+0	0
16	DF	(England) ENG	Ben Purrington (on loan from Rotherham United)	21	1	18+0	0	3+0	1	0+0	0	0+0	0	0+0	0
17	MF	(Nigeria) NGR	Joe Aribo	39	10	35+1	9	3+0	1	0+0	0	0+0	0	0+0	0
18	FW	(England) ENG	Karlan Grant	29	14	25+3	14	0+0	0	1+0	0	0+0	0	0+0	0
19	MF	(England) ENG	Albie Morgan	16	0	6+2	0	2+0	0	0+2	0	1+0	0	2+1	0
20	DF	(England) ENG	Chris Solly	38	1	36+1	1	0+1	0	0+0	0	0+0	0	0+0	0
21	GK	(England) ENG	Jed Steer (on loan from Aston Villa)	20	0	19+0	0	0+0	0	0+0	0	0+0	0	1+0	0
21	MF	(Wales) WAL	Jonny Williams	18	0	14+2	0	0+2	0	0+0	0	0+0	0	0+0	0
22	GK	(Wales) WAL	Chris Maxwell (on loan from Preston North End)	0	0	0+0	0	0+0	0	0+0	0	0+0	0	0+0	0
23	DF	(France) FRA	Naby Sarr	44	3	31+5	2	3+0	0	3+0	0	0+0	0	2+0	1
24	MF	(Republic of Ireland) IRL	Josh Cullen (on loan from West Ham United)	32	1	29+0	1	3+0	0	0+0	0	0+0	0	0+0	0
25	FW	(England) ENG	Nicky Ajose	16	3	6+3	1	0+0	0	3+0	1	1+0	0	2+1	1
31	GK	(Australia) AUS	Ashley Maynard-Brewer	1	0	0+0	0	0+0	0	0+0	0	0+0	0	1+0	0
32	MF	(England) ENG	George Lapslie	32	1	11+16	0	0+0	0	3+0	0	0+0	0	2+0	1
33	FW	(Northern Ireland) NIR	Mikhail Kennedy	0	0	0+0	0	0+0	0	0+0	0	0+0	0	0+0	0
34	DF	(England) ENG	Jamie Mascoll	3	1	0+0	0	0+0	0	0+0	0	1+0	0	1+1	1
35	FW	(England) ENG	Josh Umerah	0	0	0+0	0	0+0	0	0+0	0	0+0	0	0+0	0
36	MF	(England) ENG	Taylor Maloney	7	0	0+1	0	0+0	0	2+0	0	1+0	0	2+1	0
37	FW	(England) ENG	Reeco Hackett-Fairchild	12	0	1+6	0	0+0	0	1+1	0	1+0	0	2+0	0
38	DF	(Australia) AUS	Ryan Blumberg	2	0	0+0	0	0+0	0	0+0	0	1+0	0	1+0	0
39	DF	(England) ENG	Jo Cummings	1	0	0+0	0	0+0	0	0+0	0	1+0	0	0+0	0
40	MF	(England) ENG	Ben Dempsey	2	0	0+0	0	0+0	0	0+0	0	1+0	0	0+1	0
41	DF	(Ivory Coast) CIV	Kenneth Yao	3	0	0+0	0	0+0	0	0+0	0	0+1	0	2+0	0
42	MF	(England) ENG	Alfie Doughty	1	0	0+0	0	0+0	0	0+0	0	0+1	0	0+0	0
43	DF	(England) ENG	Toby Stevenson	7	4	2+1	0	0+0	0	3+0	1	0+0	0	1+0	3
44	MF	(England) ENG	Brendan Sarpong-Wiredu	4	0	0+0	0	0+0	0	0+2	0	0+1	0	1+0	0
45	GK	(England) ENG	Joseph Osaghae	0	0	0+0	0	0+0	0	0+0	0	0+0	0	0+0	0
46	FW	(England) ENG	Terrique Anderson	1	0	0+0	0	0+0	0	0+0	0	0+0	0	0+1	0
47	FW	(England) ENG	Luke Carey	0	0	0+0	0	0+0	0	0+0	0	0+0	0	0+0	0
48	DF	(Zimbabwe) ZIM	Jordan Zemura	0	0	0+0	0	0+0	0	0+0	0	0+0	0	0+0	0
48	FW	(England) ENG	Wilberforce Ocran	0	0	0+0	0	0+0	0	0+0	0	0+0	0	0+0	0

=== Top scorers ===
As of 26 May 2019

Place	Position	Nation	Number	Name	League One	League One play-offs	FA Cup	League Cup	EFL Trophy	Total
1	FW	(Montserrat)	9	Lyle Taylor	21	1	3	0	0	25
2	FW	(England)	18	Karlan Grant	14	0	0	0	0	14
3	MF	(Nigeria)	17	Joe Aribo	9	1	0	0	0	10
4	FW	(Angola)	14	Igor Vetokele	3	0	0	0	2	5
5	MF	(Northern Ireland)	12	Ben Reeves	4	0	0	0	0	4
=	DF	(Poland)	4	Krystian Bielik	3	1	0	0	0	4
=	MF	(England)	15	Darren Pratley	2	1	0	0	1	4
=	DF	(England)	43	Toby Stevenson	0	0	1	0	3	4
9	DF	(France)	23	Naby Sarr	2	0	0	0	1	3
=	FW	(England)	25	Nicky Ajose	1	0	1	0	1	3
11	MF	(England)	11	Tariqe Fosu	2	0	0	0	0	2
=	DF	(England)	6	Jason Pearce	2	0	0	0	0	2
=	MF	(Jamaica)	7	Mark Marshall	1	0	1	0	0	2
14	DF	(England)	20	Chris Solly	1	0	0	0	0	1
=	MF	(Northern Ireland)	16	Jamie Ward	1	0	0	0	0	1
=	DF	(Netherlands)	2	Anfernee Dijksteel	1	0	0	0	0	1
=	MF	(Republic of Ireland)	24	Josh Cullen	1	0	0	0	0	1
=	DF	(England)	16	Ben Purrington	0	1	0	0	0	1
=	DF	(Germany)	5	Patrick Bauer	0	1	0	0	0	1
=	DF	(England)	34	Jamie Mascoll	0	0	0	0	1	1
=	MF	(England)	32	George Lapslie	0	0	0	0	1	1
Own goals					5	0	0	0	0	5
Totals					73	6	6	0	10	95

=== Disciplinary record ===
As of 26 May 2019

Number	Nation	Position	Name	League One		League One play-offs		FA Cup		League Cup		EFL Trophy		Total	
Number	Nation	Position	Name	Booked	Sent off (straight red)	Booked	Sent off (straight red)	Booked	Sent off (straight red)	Booked	Sent off (straight red)	Booked	Sent off (straight red)	Booked	Sent off (straight red)
4	(Poland)	DF	Krystian Bielik	12	0	1	0	0	0	0	0	0	0	13	0
9	(Montserrat)	FW	Lyle Taylor	11	1	0	0	1	0	0	0	0	0	12	1
23	(France)	DF	Naby Sarr	8	1	1	0	0	0	0	0	0	0	9	1
15	(England)	MF	Darren Pratley	7	0	1	0	1	0	0	0	0	0	9	0
24	(Republic of Ireland)	MF	Josh Cullen	7	0	0	0	0	0	0	0	0	0	7	0
5	(Germany)	DF	Patrick Bauer	4	1	1	0	0	0	0	0	0	0	5	1
6	(England)	DF	Jason Pearce	5	0	0	0	0	0	0	0	0	0	5	0
32	(England)	MF	George Lapslie	4	0	0	0	1	0	0	0	0	0	5	0
20	(England)	DF	Chris Solly	4	2	0	0	0	0	0	0	0	0	4	2
3	(England)	DF	Lewis Page	4	0	0	0	0	0	0	0	0	0	4	0
12	(Northern Ireland)	MF	Ben Reeves	3	0	0	0	0	0	0	0	0	0	3	0
17	(Nigeria)	MF	Joe Aribo	2	0	1	0	0	0	0	0	0	0	3	0
16	(Northern Ireland)	MF	Jamie Ward	2	0	0	0	0	0	0	0	0	0	2	0
21	(England)	GK	Jed Steer	2	0	0	0	0	0	0	0	0	0	2	0
18	(England)	FW	Karlan Grant	2	0	0	0	0	0	0	0	0	0	2	0
21	(Wales)	MF	Jonny Williams	2	0	0	0	0	0	0	0	0	0	2	0
14	(Angola)	FW	Igor Vetokele	2	0	0	0	0	0	0	0	0	0	2	0
10	(Republic of Ireland)	FW	Billy Clarke	0	0	0	0	2	0	0	0	0	0	2	0
14	(England)	MF	Tariqe Fosu	1	1	0	0	0	0	0	0	0	0	1	1
1	(England)	GK	Dillon Phillips	1	0	0	0	0	0	0	0	0	0	1	0
19	(England)	MF	Albie Morgan	1	0	0	0	0	0	0	0	0	0	1	0
2	(Netherlands)	DF	Anfernee Dijksteel	1	0	0	0	0	0	0	0	0	0	1	0
7	(Jamaica)	MF	Mark Marshall	1	0	0	0	0	0	0	0	0	0	1	0
16	(England)	DF	Ben Purrington	1	0	0	0	0	0	0	0	0	0	1	0
36	(England)	MF	Taylor Maloney	0	0	0	0	1	0	0	0	0	0	1	0
39	(England)	DF	Jo Cummings	0	0	0	0	0	0	1	0	0	0	1	0
38	(Australia)	DF	Ryan Blumberg	0	0	0	0	0	0	0	0	1	0	1	0
Totals				87	6	5	0	6	0	1	0	1	0	100	6

== Transfers ==
=== Transfers in ===
Date from	Position	Nationality	Name	From	Fee	Ref.
1 July 2018	CF	(Montserrat)	Lyle Taylor	AFC Wimbledon	Free transfer	
17 July 2018	CM	(England)	Darren Pratley	Bolton Wanderers	Free transfer	
4 January 2019	CM	(Wales)	Jonny Williams	Crystal Palace	Free transfer	
16 January 2019	CF	(Algeria)	Wassim Aouachria	Olympique de Marseille	Free transfer	
31 January 2019	CF	(Antigua and Barbuda)	Josh Parker	Gillingham	Undisclosed	

=== Transfers out ===
Date from	Position	Nationality	Name	To	Fee	Ref.
1 July 2018	GK	(England)	Jordan Beeney	Free agent	Released	
1 July 2018	CM	(England)	Matt Carter	Hashtag United	Released	(Note: Matt Carter joined Hashtag United following his release.)
1 July 2018	RW	(England)	Regan Charles-Cook	Gillingham	Free transfer	
1 July 2018	LB	(England)	Archie Edwards	Free agent	Released	
1 July 2018	CF	(England)	Brandon Hanlan	Gillingham	Released	(Note: Brandon Hanlan joined Gillingham following his release.)
1 July 2018	CM	(England)	Johnnie Jackson	Retired	—N/a	
1 July 2018	CB	(England)	Ezri Konsa	Brentford	Undisclosed	
1 July 2018	CM	(Algeria)	Ahmed Kashi	Troyes	Released	(Note: Ahmed Kashi joined Troyes following his release.)
1 July 2018	CB	(England)	Harry Lennon	Southend United	Undisclosed	
1 July 2018	RW	(England)	Louis-Michel Yamfam	Free agent	Released	
30 July 2018	CF	(Northern Ireland)	Josh Magennis	Bolton Wanderers	Undisclosed	
19 December 2018	CB	(Australia)	Ryan Blumberg	University of Maryland	Free transfer	
30 January 2019	FW	(England)	Karlan Grant	Huddersfield Town	Undisclosed	
31 January 2019	AM	(Republic of Ireland)	Billy Clarke	Bradford City	Free transfer	

=== Loans in ===
Date from	Position	Nationality	Name	From	Date until	Ref.
8 August 2018	GK	(England)	Jed Steer	Aston Villa	31 December 2018	
16 August 2018	CB	(Poland)	Krystian Bielik	Arsenal	30 June 2019	
30 August 2018	CM	(Republic of Ireland)	Josh Cullen	West Ham United	30 June 2019	
31 August 2018	LW	(Northern Ireland)	Jamie Ward	Nottingham Forest	31 December 2018	
8 January 2019	GK	(Wales)	Chris Maxwell	Preston North End	30 June 2019	
10 January 2019	LB	(England)	Ben Purrington	Rotherham United	30 June 2019	
8 February 2019	MF	(England)	Abraham Odoh	Tooting & Mitcham United	30 June 2019	

=== Loans out ===
Date from	Position	Nationality	Name	To	Date until	Ref.
27 July 2018	DF	(Antigua and Barbuda)	Daniel Bowry	Hampton & Richmond Borough	19 September 2018	
8 August 2018	CF	(England)	Josh Umerah	Boreham Wood	27 April 2019	
7 September 2018	FW	(England)	Reeco Hackett-Fairchild	Boreham Wood	5 October 2018	
18 September 2018	DF	(Ivory Coast)	Kenneth Yao	Dartford	20 October 2018	
17 October 2018	CB	(England)	Jo Cummings	Guiseley	18 January 2019	
19 October 2018	MF	(England)	Alfie Doughty	Kingstonian	17 November 2018	
10 November 2018	FW	(England)	Wilberforce Ocran	Cray Wanderers	10 December 2018	
30 November 2018	GK	(Australia)	Ashley Maynard-Brewer	Chelmsford City	1 January 2019	
12 December 2018	CM	(England)	Ben Dempsey	Kingstonian	1 January 2019	
26 December 2018	FW	(Northern Ireland)	Mikhail Kennedy	Chelmsford City	26 January 2019	
14 January 2019	FW	(England)	Nicky Ajose	Mansfield Town	30 June 2019	
8 February 2019	MF	(England)	Brendan Sarpong-Wiredu	Bromley	27 April 2019	
21 February 2019	DF	(England)	Jamie Mascoll	Dulwich Hamlet	27 April 2019	
9 March 2019	MF	(England)	Taylor Maloney	Concord Rangers	27 April 2019	
12 March 2019	FW	(England)	Reeco Hackett-Fairchild	Bromley	6 April 2019	
22 March 2019	GK	(Australia)	Ashley Maynard-Brewer	Hampton & Richmond Borough	27 April 2019	
28 March 2019	FW	(Northern Ireland)	Mikhail Kennedy	Concord Rangers	27 April 2019	

== Competitions ==
=== Friendlies ===
On 22 May 2018, Charlton Athletic announced its first confirmed friendly taking place ahead of the 2018–19 season would be against Welling United at Park View Road. On 29 May the first home friendly was announced which would see Brighton & Hove Albion visit The Valley on 24 July 2018. A further home friendly was added against Norwich City for 28 July 2018. On 27 June 2018 it was announced that a behind-closed door friendly between Queens Park Rangers and Charlton Athletic would take place on 7 July at QPR's Harlington training ground.

7 July 2018 Friendly	Queens Park Rangers	3–3	Charlton Athletic	Hayes
10:30 BST	Eze 39'; Washington 60'; Baptiste 85'	Report	Taylor 29'; Vetokele 45+3'; Bauer 83'	Stadium: Harlington Training Ground; Attendance: 0

14 July 2018 Friendly	Welling United	1–2	Charlton Athletic	Welling
12:30 BST	Coombes 6'	Report	Ajose 7'; Taylor 76'	Stadium: Park View Road; Attendance: 1,020; Referee: P. Howard

17 July 2018 Friendly	Charlton Athletic	2–2	Cambridge United	New Eltham
12:00 BST (120 minute game)	Magennis 14' (pen.); Bauer 40'	Report	Ibehre 7'; Maris 76'	Stadium: Sparrows Lane Training Ground; Attendance: 0

18 July 2018 Friendly	Dulwich Hamlet	1–2	Charlton Athletic	Mitcham
19:45 BST	Lawrence 37'	Report	Taylor 15'; Forster-Caskey 53'	Stadium: Imperial Fields; Referee: D. Skipper

21 July 2018 Friendly	Crawley Town	0–2	Charlton Athletic	East Grinstead
15:00 BST		Report	Aribo 8'; Grant 62'	Stadium: East Court Stadium; Attendance: 450; Referee: Gavin Ward

24 July 2018 Friendly	Charlton Athletic	1–1	Brighton & Hove Albion	Charlton
19:45 BST	Sarr 80'	Report	Groß 47'	Stadium: The Valley; Attendance: 2,256; Referee: Gavin Ward

28 July 2018 Friendly	Charlton Athletic	1–0	Norwich City	Charlton
15:00 BST	Forster-Caskey 59'	Report		Stadium: The Valley; Attendance: 2,110; Referee: Craig Hicks

=== League One ===
==== League table ====
Pos	Team	Pld	W	D	L	GF	GA	GD	Pts	Promotion, qualification or relegation
1	Luton Town (C, P)	46	27	13	6	90	42	+48	94	Promotion to the EFL Championship
2	Barnsley (P)	46	26	13	7	80	39	+41	91	Promotion to the EFL Championship
3	Charlton Athletic (O, P)	46	26	10	10	73	40	+33	88	Qualification for League One play-offs (Note: Four teams play for one spot and promotion to the EFL Championship.)
4	Portsmouth	46	25	13	8	83	51	+32	88	Qualification for League One play-offs
5	Sunderland	46	22	19	5	80	47	+33	85	Qualification for League One play-offs

Source: EFL Official Website
Rules for classification: 1) Points; 2) Goal difference; 3) Number of goals scored; 4) Head-to-head results
(C) Champions; (O) Play-off winners; (P) Promoted

==== Result summary ====
Overall								Home						Away					
Pld	W	D	L	GF	GA	GD	Pts	W	D	L	GF	GA	GD	W	D	L	GF	GA	GD
46	26	10	10	73	40	+33	88	16	5	2	41	15	+26	10	5	8	32	25	+7

Last updated: 4 May 2019.

==== Results by round ====
Round	1	2	3	4	5	6	7	8	9	10	11	12	13	14	15	16	17	18	19	20	21	22	23	24	25	26	27	28	29	30	31	32	33	34	35	36	37	38	39	40	41	42	43	44	45	46
Ground	A	H	A	H	H	A	H	A	H	A	A	H	H	H	A	H	A	H	A	A	A	H	H	A	A	H	H	A	H	A	A	H	H	A	A	H	H	A	H	A	A	H	A	H	A	H
Result	L	W	D	L	D	W	W	W	W	D	L	L	W	D	L	W	W	W	W	L	W	W	W	L	L	W	D	W	W	D	L	D	D	W	D	W	W	D	W	W	W	W	L	W	W	W
Position	17	11	12	14	14	10	8	7	6	6	8	9	9	11	13	8	6	6	6	7	5	5	4	4	6	5	4	4	4	4	5	5	5	5	5	5	5	5	5	5	5	5	5	5	5	3

Updated to match(es) played on 4 May 2019. Source:
A = Away; H = Home; W = Win; D = Draw; L = Loss

==== Matches ====
4 August 2018 1	Sunderland	2–1	Charlton Athletic	Sunderland
12:30 BST	Maja 65'; Gooch 90+6'	Report	Taylor 10' (pen.)	Stadium: Stadium of Light; Attendance: 31,075; Referee: John Brooks

11 August 2018 2	Charlton Athletic	2–1	Shrewsbury Town	Charlton
15:00 BST	Taylor 62'; Grant 90+1'	Report	John-Lewis 83'	Stadium: The Valley; Attendance: 9,429; Referee: Craig Hicks

18 August 2018 3	Accrington Stanley	1–1	Charlton Athletic	Accrington
15:00 BST	Clark 78'	Report	Grant 15'	Stadium: Crown Ground; Attendance: 2,265; Referee: Ross Joyce

21 August 2018 4	Charlton Athletic	0–1	Peterborough United	Charlton
19:45 BST		Report	Cummings 89' (pen.)	Stadium: The Valley; Attendance: 9,762; Referee: James Linington

25 August 2018 5	Charlton Athletic	0–0	Fleetwood Town	Charlton
15:00 BST		Report		Stadium: The Valley; Attendance: 8,810; Referee: Antony Coggins

1 September 2018 6	Southend United	1–2	Charlton Athletic	Southend-on-Sea
15:00 BST	Robinson 60'	Report	Taylor 57'; Bielik 87'	Stadium: Roots Hall; Attendance: 7,923; Referee: Brett Huxtable

8 September 2018 7	Charlton Athletic	3–2	Wycombe Wanderers	Charlton
15:00 BST	Jombati 32' (o.g.); Taylor 71'; Sarr 80'	Report	Williams 7'; Cowan-Hall 90'	Stadium: The Valley; Attendance: 10,358; Referee: Graham Salisbury

15 September 2018 8	Bradford City	0–2	Charlton Athletic	Bradford
15:00 BST		Report	Grant 3'; Taylor 81'	Stadium: Valley Parade; Attendance: 15,709; Referee: Jeremy Simpson

22 September 2018 9	Charlton Athletic	2–1	Plymouth Argyle	Charlton
15:00 BST	Grant 12', 88'	Report	Carey 9'	Stadium: The Valley; Attendance: 10,818; Referee: Dean Whitestone

29 September 2018 10	Luton Town	2–2	Charlton Athletic	Luton
15:00 BST	Cornick 74'; Collins 81'	Report	Fosu 23' (pen.); Solly 90+5'	Stadium: Kenilworth Road; Attendance: 9,502; Referee: Antony Coggins

2 October 2018 11	Scunthorpe United	5–3	Charlton Athletic	Scunthorpe
19:45 BST	Goode 3'; Borthwick-Jackson 30', 38'; Morris 73' (pen.); Humphrys 90+3'	Report	Taylor 18'; Aribo 22', 69'	Stadium: Glanford Park; Attendance: 3,341; Referee: Darren Drysdale

6 October 2018 12	Charlton Athletic	1–2	Coventry City	Charlton
15:00 BST	Taylor 45+2' (pen.)	Report	Bakayoko 81', 90+1'	Stadium: The Valley; Attendance: 11,743; Referee: Ben Toner

20 October 2018 13	Charlton Athletic	2–0	Barnsley	Charlton
15:00 BST	Grant 8', 52'	Report		Stadium: The Valley; Attendance: 12,416; Referee: James Linington

23 October 2018 14	Charlton Athletic	1–1	Oxford United	Charlton
19:45 BST	Taylor 25' (pen.)	Report	Whyte 71'	Stadium: The Valley; Attendance: 9,984; Referee: Dean Whitestone

27 October 2018 15	Rochdale	1–0	Charlton Athletic	Rochdale
15:00 BST	Henderson 4'	Report		Stadium: Spotland Stadium; Attendance: 3,109; Referee: Andy Haines

3 November 2018 16	Charlton Athletic	2–0	Doncaster Rovers	Charlton
15:00 GMT	Aribo 18'; Grant 33'	Report		Stadium: The Valley; Attendance: 9,873; Referee: Gavin Ward

6 November 2018 17	Walsall	0–2	Charlton Athletic	Walsall
19:45 GMT		Report	Taylor 6' (pen.); Bielik 51'	Stadium: Bescot Stadium; Attendance: 3,719; Referee: Tom Nield

24 November 2018 18	Charlton Athletic	3–1	Bristol Rovers	Charlton
15:00 GMT	Ward 10'; Aribo 45'; Grant 90+4'	Report	Martin 30'	Stadium: The Valley; Attendance: 10,328; Referee: Matt Donohue

27 November 2018 19	Burton Albion	1–2	Charlton Athletic	Burton upon Trent
19:45 GMT	Akins 25' (pen.)	Report	Grant 32' (pen.); Pearce 88'	Stadium: Pirelli Stadium; Attendance: 2,438; Referee: Ross Joyce

8 December 2018 20	Blackpool	2–1	Charlton Athletic	Blackpool
15:00 GMT	Gnanduillet 16'; Delfouneso 87'	Report	Aribo 55'	Stadium: Bloomfield Road; Attendance: 3,024; Referee: Tony Harrington

11 December 2018 21	Portsmouth	1–2	Charlton Athletic	Portsmouth
19:45 GMT	Green 88'	Report	Grant 23'; Ajose 43'	Stadium: Fratton Park; Attendance: 17,891; Referee: John Brooks

15 December 2018 22	Charlton Athletic	2–0	AFC Wimbledon	Charlton
15:00 GMT	Taylor 60'; Marshall 86'	Report		Stadium: The Valley; Attendance: 10,691; Referee: Trevor Kettle

22 December 2018 23	Charlton Athletic	2–0	Gillingham	Charlton
15:00 GMT	Reeves 6'; Fosu 39'	Report		Stadium: The Valley; Attendance: 12,836; Referee: Charles Breakspear

26 December 2018 24	Coventry City	2–1	Charlton Athletic	Coventry
15:00 GMT	Hiwula 41'; Bayliss 89'	Report	Pratley 58'	Stadium: Ricoh Arena; Attendance: 13,013; Referee: Simon Hooper

29 December 2018 25	Barnsley	2–1	Charlton Athletic	Barnsley
15:00 GMT	Potts 5'; Thiam 14'	Report	Reeves 73'	Stadium: Oakwell; Attendance: 11,978; Referee: Darren Bond

1 January 2019 26	Charlton Athletic	2–1	Walsall	Charlton
15:00 GMT	Grant 6'; Taylor 9' (pen.)	Report	Cook 47'	Stadium: The Valley; Attendance: 10,421; Referee: Ross Joyce

5 January 2019 27	Charlton Athletic	1–1	Sunderland	Charlton
15:00 GMT	James 50' (o.g.)	Report	O'Nien 2'	Stadium: The Valley; Attendance: 16,317; Referee: Steve Martin

12 January 2019 28	Shrewsbury Town	0–3	Charlton Athletic	Shrewsbury
15:00 GMT		Report	Taylor 26'; Pratley 54'; Grant 79' (pen.)	Stadium: New Meadow; Attendance: 5,995; Referee: Anthony Backhouse

19 January 2019 29	Charlton Athletic	1–0	Accrington Stanley	Charlton
15:00 GMT	Grant 90+3' (pen.)	Report		Stadium: The Valley; Attendance: 11,877; Referee: John Busby

26 January 2019 30	Peterborough United	0–0	Charlton Athletic	Peterborough
15:00 GMT		Report		Stadium: London Road Stadium; Attendance: 9,002; Referee: David Webb

2 February 2019 31	Fleetwood Town	1–0	Charlton Athletic	Fleetwood
15:00 GMT	Evans 68'	Report		Stadium: Highbury Stadium; Attendance: 2,742; Referee: Tony Harrington

9 February 2019 32	Charlton Athletic	1–1	Southend United	Charlton
15:00 GMT	Reeves 59'	Report	Humphrys 22'	Stadium: The Valley; Attendance: 12,389; Referee: Simon Hooper

16 February 2019 33	Charlton Athletic	0–0	Blackpool	Charlton
15:00 GMT		Report		Stadium: The Valley; Attendance: 17,267; Referee: Kevin Johnson

23 February 2019 34	AFC Wimbledon	1–2	Charlton Athletic	Kingston upon Thames
15:00 GMT	Folivi 24'	Report	Sarr 51'; Vetokele 90+1'	Stadium: Kingsmeadow; Attendance: 4,532; Referee: Chris Kavanagh

2 March 2019 35	Doncaster Rovers	1–1	Charlton Athletic	Doncaster
15:00 GMT	Wilks 15'	Report	Marquis 72' (o.g.)	Stadium: Keepmoat Stadium; Attendance: 8,385; Referee: Ben Toner

9 March 2019 36	Charlton Athletic	2–1	Portsmouth	Charlton
17:30 GMT	Aribo 41'; Taylor 51'	Report	Curtis 45+1'	Stadium: The Valley; Attendance: 14,451; Referee: Roger East

12 March 2019 37	Charlton Athletic	2–1	Burton Albion	Charlton
19:45 GMT	Taylor 6' (pen.); Reeves 33'	Report	Akins 19' (pen.)	Stadium: The Valley; Attendance: 9,505; Referee: Thomas Bramall

16 March 2019 38	Bristol Rovers	0–0	Charlton Athletic	Horfield
15:00 GMT		Report		Stadium: Memorial Stadium; Attendance: 8,343; Referee: Dean Whitestone

30 March 2019 39	Charlton Athletic	1–0	Bradford City	Charlton
15:00 GMT	Taylor 19'	Report		Stadium: The Valley; Attendance: 11,630; Referee: Martin Coy

6 April 2019 40	Plymouth Argyle	0–2	Charlton Athletic	Plymouth
15:00 BST		Report	Taylor 41'; Canavan 49' (o.g.)	Stadium: Home Park; Attendance: 10,696; Referee: Charles Breakspear

9 April 2019 41	Wycombe Wanderers	0–1	Charlton Athletic	High Wycombe
19:45 BST		Report	Pearce 35'	Stadium: Adams Park; Attendance: 5,487; Referee: Antony Coggins

13 April 2019 42	Charlton Athletic	3–1	Luton Town	Charlton
15:00 BST	Taylor 54' (pen.), 72'; Vetokele 70'	Report	Cornick 15'	Stadium: The Valley; Attendance: 16,449; Referee: Gavin Ward

19 April 2019 43	Oxford United	2–1	Charlton Athletic	Oxford
13:00 BST	Nelson 18'; Garbutt 23'	Report	Taylor 5' (pen.)	Stadium: Kassam Stadium; Attendance: 8,680; Referee: Darren Drysdale

22 April 2019 44	Charlton Athletic	4–0	Scunthorpe United	Charlton
15:00 BST	Dijksteel 24'; Aribo 57'; Vetokele 63'; Taylor 66'	Report		Stadium: The Valley; Attendance: 11,973; Referee: Brett Huxtable

27 April 2019 45	Gillingham	0–2	Charlton Athletic	Gillingham
15:00 BST		Report	Aribo 24'; Cullen 42'	Stadium: Priestfield Stadium; Attendance: 8,047; Referee: Lee Swabey

4 May 2019 46	Charlton Athletic	4–0	Rochdale	Charlton
17:30 BST	Aribo 19'; Andrew 32' (o.g.); Taylor 40'; Bielik 75'	Report		Stadium: The Valley; Attendance: 12,705; Referee: Charles Breakspear

=== League One play-offs ===
12 May 2019 Semi-final First leg	Doncaster Rovers	1–2	Charlton Athletic	Doncaster
12:15 BST	Blair 87'	Report	Taylor 32'; Aribo 34'	Stadium: Keepmoat Stadium; Attendance: 11,140; Referee: Oliver Langford

17 May 2019 Semi-final Second leg	Charlton Athletic	2–3 (a.e.t.) (4–4 agg.) (4–3 p)	Doncaster Rovers	Charlton
19:45 BST	Bielik 2'; Pratley 101'	Report	Rowe 11'; Butler 88'; Marquis 100'	Stadium: The Valley; Attendance: 25,428; Referee: Gavin Ward
	Penalties
	Solly (penalty scored); Cullen (penalty scored); Taylor (penalty scored); Aribo (penalty scored); Sarr (penalty missed)		Whiteman (penalty scored); Sadlier (penalty scored); Crawford (penalty scored); Marquis (penalty missed); Rowe (penalty missed)

26 May 2019 Final	Charlton Athletic	2–1	Sunderland	Wembley
15:00 BST	Purrington 35'; Bauer 90+4'	Report	Sarr 5' (o.g.)	Stadium: Wembley Stadium; Attendance: 76,155; Referee: Andrew Madley

=== FA Cup ===
The first round draw was made live on BBC by Dennis Wise and Dion Dublin on 22 October. The draw for the second round was made live on BBC and BT by Mark Schwarzer and Glenn Murray on 12 November.

11 November 2018 First round	Mansfield Town	1–1	Charlton Athletic	Mansfield
12:45 GMT	Hamilton 45'	Report	Stevenson 73'	Stadium: Field Mill; Attendance: 3,240; Referee: Ollie Yates

20 November 2018 First round replay	Charlton Athletic	5–0	Mansfield Town	Charlton
19:45 GMT	Taylor 11', 52', 85'; Marshall 81'; Ajose 90+1'	Report		Stadium: The Valley; Attendance: 1,910; Referee: Kevin Johnson

1 December 2018 Second round	Charlton Athletic	0–2	Doncaster Rovers	Charlton
15:00 GMT		Report	Butler 66'; Marquis 77'	Stadium: The Valley; Attendance: 3,249; Referee: Brett Huxtable

=== EFL Cup ===
On 15 June 2018, Charlton Athletic were drawn away to Milton Keynes Dons in the first round.

14 August 2018 First round	Milton Keynes Dons	3–0	Charlton Athletic	Milton Keynes
19:45 BST	Asonganyi 7'; Watson 16'; Cummings 71' (o.g.)	Report		Stadium: Stadium mk Attendance: 3,052; Referee: John Busby

=== EFL Trophy ===
On 13 July 2018, the initial group stage draw bar the U21 invited clubs was announced.

Pos	Lge	Team	Pld	W	PW	PL	L	GF	GA	GD	Pts	Qualification
1	ACA	Swansea City U21 (Q)	3	2	0	0	1	2	5	−3	6	Round 2
2	L1	AFC Wimbledon (Q)	3	1	1	0	1	6	3	+3	5	Round 2
3	L1	Charlton Athletic (E)	3	1	0	1	1	10	3	+7	4	
4	L2	Stevenage (E)	3	1	0	0	2	5	12	−7	3	

First match(es) will be played: 4 September 2018. Source: EFL.com
(E) Eliminated; (Q) Qualified to the phase indicated

4 September 2018 Group stage 1	Charlton Athletic	2–2 (2–4 p)	AFC Wimbledon	Charlton
19:45 BST	Sarr 43'; Mascoll 84'	Report	Hartigan 27'; Soares 49'	Stadium: The Valley; Attendance: 1,244; Referee: K. Johnson
	Penalties
	Ajose (penalty missed); Morgan (penalty scored); Lapslie (penalty missed); Hackett-Fairchild (penalty scored)		Appiah (penalty scored); Hartigan (penalty scored); Pinnock (penalty scored); Hanson (penalty scored)

9 October 2018 Group stage 2	Stevenage	0–8	Charlton Athletic	Stevenage
19:45 BST		Report	Pratley 25'; Stevenson 27', 59', 74' (pen.); Ajose 34'; Vetokele 48', 58'; Lapslie 87'	Stadium: Broadhall Way; Attendance: 793; Referee: L. Swabey

13 November 2018 Group stage 3	Charlton Athletic	0–1	Swansea City U21	Charlton
19:45 GMT		Report	Marić 55'	Stadium: The Valley; Attendance: 740; Referee: C. Breakspear

=== Kent Senior Cup ===
14 November 2018 Second round	Cray Wanderers	1–5	Charlton Athletic	Bromley
19:45 GMT	Cummings 76' (o.g.)	Report	Zemura 7'; Carey 14'; Anderson 21', 54'; Isiaka 77'	Stadium: Hayes Lane; Attendance: 161; Referee: Peter Cruise

15 January 2019 Quarter-final	Bromley	3–1	Charlton Athletic	Bromley
19:45 GMT	Hooper 73', 78' (pen.), 79'	Report	Sarpong-Wiredu 48'	Stadium: Hayes Lane; Attendance: 371; Referee: Ian Fissenden
