= Toby Stevenson =

Toby Stevenson may refer to:

- Toby Stevenson (pole vaulter)
- Toby Stevenson (footballer)
