= Joe Aribo =

Nigerian footballer (born 1996)

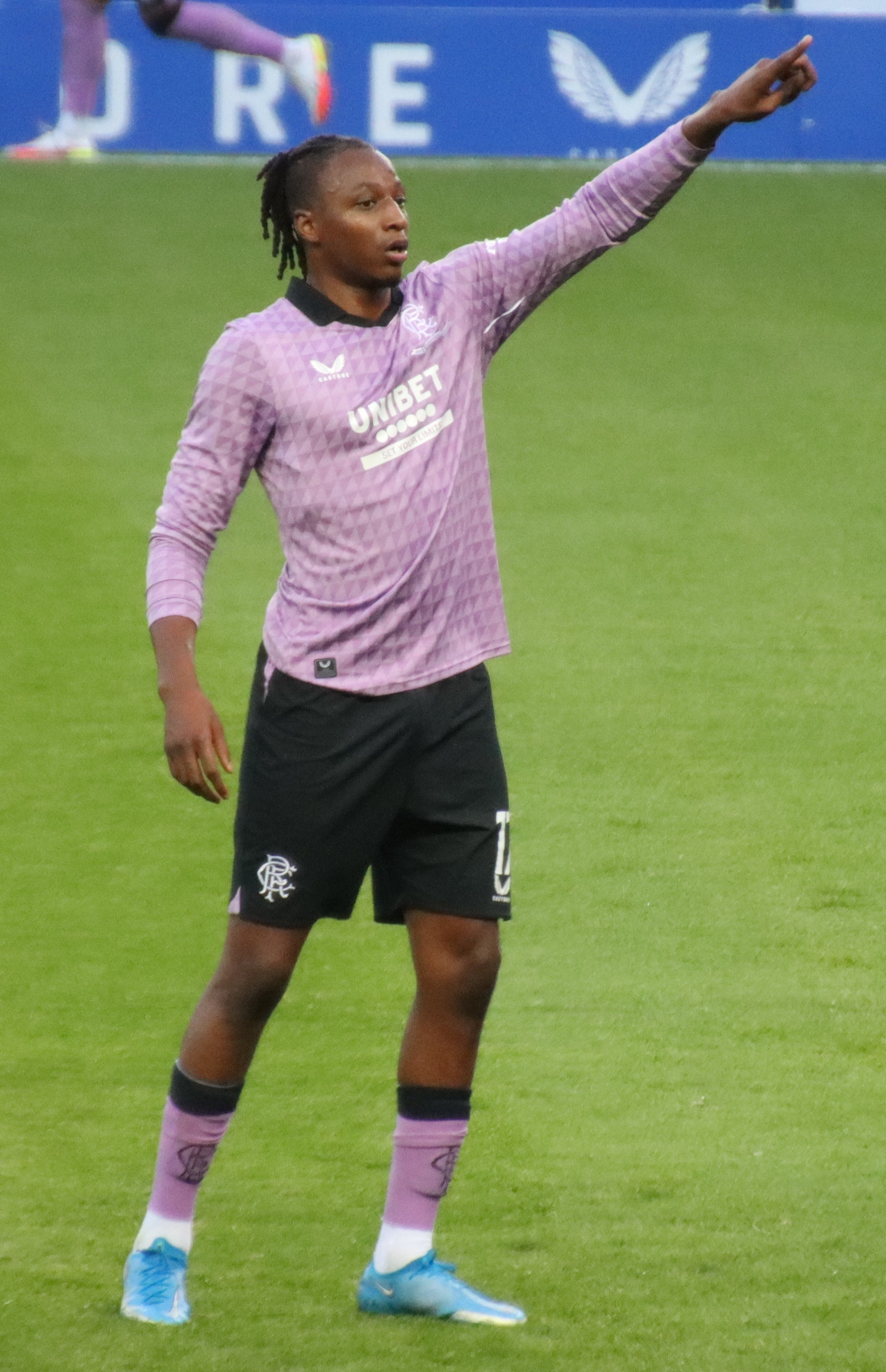
- Aribo playing for Rangers in 2021

Personal information
- Full name: Joseph Oluwaseyi Temitope Ayodele-Aribo
- Date of birth: 21 July 1996 (age 30)
- Place of birth: Camberwell, England
- Height: 1.83 m (6 ft 0 in)
- Position: Midfielder

Youth career
- Kinetic Academy
- Staines Town

Senior career*
Years	Team	Apps	(Gls)
2014–2015	Staines Town	22	(0)
2015–2019	Charlton Athletic	81	(14)
2019–2022	Rangers	92	(18)
2022–2026	Southampton	95	(9)
2026	→ Leicester City (loan)	6	(0)

International career^{‡}
2019–	Nigeria	34	(2)
Medal record
Men's football
Representing Nigeria
Africa Cup of Nations
Runner-up	2023
- * Club domestic league appearances and goals as of 06:22, 22 March 2026 (UTC) ‡ National team caps and goals as of 23:52, 11 February 2024 (UTC)

Joseph Oluwaseyi Temitope Ayodele-Aribo MON (born 21 July 1996) is a professional footballer who plays as a midfielder for the Nigeria national team. He is a free agent.

He began his club career at Staines Town then spent four years with Charlton Athletic in the English Football League. In 2019 he signed for Rangers, where he won the Scottish Premiership in 2021 and the Scottish Cup a year later. He joined Southampton in July 2022. Aribo spent half of the 2025–26 season on loan at Leicester City.

Born and raised in London, Aribo plays for the Nigeria national team, being eligible due to his heritage. He gained his first cap in 2019, and was part of their squad for the Africa Cup of Nations in 2021 and 2023, finishing as runner-up in the latter tournament.

== Club career ==
=== Staines Town ===
Aribo played for Staines Town under Marcus Gayle in the Isthmian League Premier Division, winning the club's academy player of the year award in April 2014.

=== Charlton Athletic ===
Aribo joined Charlton Athletic in September 2015 following a successful trial, and signed a one-year contract in May 2016. He made his first-team debut as a 62nd-minute substitute for Andrew Crofts in a 2–0 defeat to Crawley Town in an EFL Trophy group stage match at The Valley on 16 October 2016. His EFL League One debut came on 17 December in a 2–0 home loss to Peterborough United as a 70th-minute replacement for Fredrik Ulvestad, and six days later he extended his contract until 2019.

Aribo scored his first career goal on 1 November 2017, the winner in a 3–2 home win over Fulham under-21 in the EFL Trophy group stage. His first league goal on 23 December opened a 1–1 draw with Blackpool at The Valley; he netted four more goals over the season to help the Addicks to sixth place and the playoffs, including two on 2 April 2018 in a 3–1 win against Rotherham United.

Aribo scored in each of the last three games of 2018–19 as Charlton came third, contributing to wins over Scunthorpe United, Gillingham and Rochdale. On 12 May, he then netted in a 2–1 win away to Doncaster Rovers in the first leg of the playoff semi-finals, as his team eventually were promoted.

=== Rangers ===
Aribo was offered a new contract by Charlton at the end of the 2018–19 season, but he instead opted to sign a four-year deal with Scottish Premiership club Rangers. He made his competitive debut for the club on 9 July 2019 in a 4–0 win over St Joseph's of Gibraltar in the Europa League; eight days later in the second leg he scored his first goal to open a 6–0 win at Ibrox. On 25 September, he suffered a head wound from Livingston's Ricki Lamie and was taken off after 20 minutes, receiving 20 stitches and being ruled out for a month; on his return to Almondvale he scored his first league goal in a 2–0 win on 10 November.

Aribo contributed seven goals to Rangers' 2020–21 title-winning season, including two in an 8–0 win over Hamilton Academical on 8 November. In May, he was singled out for praise by manager Steven Gerrard for playing as an emergency left-back due to Borna Barišić's absence in a 3–0 win at Livingston: "That left-back performance is as good as we have seen in my three years that I have been here. So well done to him for parking his ego and doing a fantastic job for his teammates".

In 2021–22, Aribo played 17 Europa League games as Rangers finished runners-up, and he opened the scoring in the 1–1 final draw against Eintracht Frankfurt on 18 May before defeat on penalties. In all competitions, he played 57 games, scored nine goals and assisted 10.

=== Southampton ===
On 9 July 2022, Aribo joined Southampton and signed a four-year contract. On 6 August 2022, Aribo made his Premier League debut in Southampton's 4–1 defeat to Tottenham Hotspur. A week later, Aribo scored his first goal for the club in their 2–2 draw against Leeds United. In his first season with Southampton, the club were relegated from the Premier League.

On 26 December 2023, Aribo scored his first goal of the 2023–24 season in a 5–0 victory against Swansea City. He played in the 2024 EFL Championship play-off final against Leeds United on 26 May 2024, which ended in a 1–0 victory for Southampton and secured promotion to the Premier League. Aribo played 40 matches and scored four goals in all competitions during the 2023–24 season.

On 2 February 2026, Aribo joined Leicester City on loan for the remainder of the 2025–26 season. He made his debut for the club on 7 February in a 2–1 defeat against Birmingham City. Aribo only made six appearances for the club during his loan spell.

Following the conclusion of the 2025–26 season, Aribo was released by Southampton.

== International career ==
In August 2019, Aribo was called up by Nigeria manager Gernot Rohr for a friendly away to Ukraine. He made his debut in the game in Dnipro on 10 September, and scored in the fourth minute of the 2–2 draw. On 13 October, he scored the Super Eagles' goal in a friendly draw with Brazil in Singapore.

At the 2021 Africa Cup of Nations in Cameroon, Aribo played two group-stage wins and the 1–0 last-16 elimination by Tunisia.

== Style of play ==
Aribo is a versatile player who can play centrally or in a wide midfield role. Technically proficient, he is able to use his long legs to shield the ball from opponents effectively. Speaking in October 2016, he said that his strengths were "driving with the ball and getting up the pitch".

== Career statistics ==
=== Club ===
As of match played 21 March 2026

Appearances and goals by club, season and competition
Club	Season	League			National cup (Note: Includes FA Cup, Scottish Cup)		League cup (Note: Includes EFL Cup, Scottish League Cup)		Europe		Other		Total	
Club	Season	Division	Apps	Goals	Apps	Goals	Apps	Goals	Apps	Goals	Apps	Goals	Apps	Goals
Staines Town (Note: Data unavailable for the FA Cup third qualifying round replay and FA Trophy third qualifying round)	2014–15	Conference South	22	0	2	0	—		—		1 (Note: Appearance in FA Trophy)	0	25	0
Charlton Athletic	2015–16	Championship	0	0	0	0	0	0	—		—		0	0
Charlton Athletic	2016–17	League One	19	0	1	0	0	0	—		2 (Note: Appearances in EFL Trophy)	0	22	0
Charlton Athletic	2017–18	League One	26	5	1	0	2	0	—		7 (Note: Five appearances and one goal in EFL Trophy, two appearances in League One play-offs)	1	36	6
Charlton Athletic	2018–19	League One	36	9	0	0	0	0	—		3 (Note: Appearances in League One play-offs)	1	39	10
Charlton Athletic	Total		81	14	2	0	2	0	—		12	2	97	16
Rangers	2019–20	Scottish Premiership	27	3	3	1	4	1	15 (Note: Appearances in UEFA Europa League)	4	—		49	9
Rangers	2020–21	Scottish Premiership	31	7	2	0	1	0	9	1	—		43	8
Rangers	2021–22	Scottish Premiership	34	8	2	0	3	0	18 (Note: One appearance in UEFA Champions League, seventeen appearances and one goal in UEFA Europa League)	1	—		57	9
Rangers	Total		92	18	7	1	8	1	42	6	—		149	26
Southampton	2022–23	Premier League	21	2	3	0	3	0	—		—		27	2
Southampton	2023–24	Championship	35	4	1	0	1	0	—		3 (Note: Appearances in Championship play-offs)	0	40	4
Southampton	2024–25	Premier League	32	3	2	0	3	0	—		—		37	3
Southampton	2025–26	Championship	7	0	0	0	0	0	—		—		7	0
Southampton	Total		95	9	6	0	7	0	—		3	0	111	9
Leicester City (loan)	2025–26	Championship	6	0	0	0	—		—		—		6	0
Career total			296	41	17	1	17	1	42	6	16	2	388	51

=== International ===
As of match played 11 February 2024

Appearances and goals by national team and year
National team	Year	Apps	Goals
Nigeria	2019	4	2
Nigeria	2020	2	0
Nigeria	2021	6	0
Nigeria	2022	9	0
Nigeria	2023	7	0
Nigeria	2024	6	0
Total		34	2

Scores and results list Nigeria's goal tally first.

International goals by date, venue, cap, opponent, score, result and competition
No.	Date	Venue	Cap	Opponent	Score	Result	Competition
1	10 September 2019	Dnipro-Arena, Dnipro, Ukraine	1	Ukraine	1–0	2–2	Friendly
2	13 October 2019	National Stadium, Kallang, Singapore	2	Brazil	1–0	1–1	Friendly

== Honours ==
Charlton Athletic

- EFL League One play-offs: 2019

Rangers

- Scottish Premiership: 2020–21
- Scottish Cup: 2021–22
- Scottish League Cup runner-up: 2019–20
- UEFA Europa League runner-up: 2021–22

Southampton

- EFL Championship play-offs: 2024

Nigeria

- Africa Cup of Nations runner-up: 2023

Individual

- Rangers Young Player of the Year: 2019–20
- Rangers Goal of the Season: 2019–20

Orders

- Member of the Order of the Niger
