= Jamie Mascoll =

English footballer (born 1997)

Personal information
- Full name: Jamie Daniel Mascoll
- Date of birth: 15 March 1997 (age 29)
- Place of birth: Catford, England
- Height: 6 ft 2 in (1.89 m)
- Positions: Defender; midfielder; winger

Team information
- Current team: Ashford United

Youth career
- –2014: Dulwich Hamlet

Senior career*
Years	Team	Apps	(Gls)
2014–2017	Dulwich Hamlet	8	(0)
2015–2016	→ Phoenix Sports (loan)	11	(0)
2016	→ Cray Wanderers (loan)	14	(2)
2016–2017	→ Grays Athletic (loan)	26	(0)
2017–2019	Charlton Athletic	0	(0)
2019	→ Dulwich Hamlet (loan)	11	(1)
2019–2020	Wycombe Wanderers	4	(0)
2020–2021	Bolton Wanderers	7	(0)
2021	→ Waterford (loan)	16	(1)
2021–2022	Wealdstone	17	(1)
2022	Lewes	22	(2)
2023	Hornchurch	6	(1)
2023–2024	Cray Wanderers	22	(1)
2024	Chatham Town	12	(0)
2024	Folkestone Invicta	17	(0)
2025–2026	AFC Whyteleafe	47	(7)
2026–	Ashford United	1	(0)
- * Club domestic league appearances and goals as of 18:49, 20 August 2026 (UTC)

Jamie Daniel Mascoll (born 15 March 1997) is an English professional footballer who plays as a defender, midfielder or winger for Isthmian League South East Division club Ashford United.

== Career ==
Mascoll was born in Catford, London and started his career with local side Dulwich Hamlet, graduating from the club's Aspire Academy. He made his first team debut for the club on 7 October 2014, when he was substituted on in the 1–0 win over Thamesmead Town in the London Senior Cup. He went on to make another two cup appearances during the 2014–15 season. He made eight appearances for Dulwich at the start of the 2015–16 season before he joined Isthmian League Division One North side Phoenix Sports on loan in December 2015. He went on to be a key player for the club, making a total of seven starts during the loan spell. On 6 February 2016 he joined Isthmian League Division One North side Cray Wanderers on loan instead of returning to Champion Hill. At the start of the 2016–17 season in August, signed for fellow Isthmian League Premier Division rivals Grays Athletic on loan. He went on to make thirty appearances in all competitions for Grays before returning to Dulwich in February 2017, where he played in a number of games in the climax of the season.

On 21 August 2017 he signed for EFL League One side Charlton Athletic on a one-year contract following a successful trial and was placed into the under-23 squad. He had previously had a trial at Charlton as an under-16 player but was unsuccessful. He made his professional debut on 1 November 2017 in the 3–2 win over Fulham U23 in the EFL Trophy. He scored his first professional goal in an EFL Trophy tie against AFC Wimbledon on 4 September 2018. On 21 February 2019, Mascoll re-joined Dulwich Hamlet on an initial one-month loan.

Mascoll signed for Wycombe Wanderers on 23 July 2019. After making eight senior appearances that season, he was released.

On 24 August 2020, he joined Bolton Wanderers on a one-year deal. His debut came on 19 September when he came off the bench in the 81st minute, replacing Nathan Delfouneso in a 2–0 defeat to Colchester United. His first goal came on 17 November as he scored Bolton's third goal in a 3–2 win against Newcastle United U21in the EFL Trophy.

On 24 February 2021, he joined League of Ireland Premier Division side Waterford on loan, becoming one of Everton legend Kevin Sheedy's first signings as manager of the club. He made his debut for the club in the opening game of the season on 19 March 2021 as his side lost 1–0 away to newly promoted side Drogheda United. On 19 May 2021, Bolton announced he would be released at the end of his contract. On 25 May 2021, he scored his first goal for Waterford, opening the scoring against Finn Harps at the RSC.

On 9 November 2021, Mascoll signed for National League side Wealdstone. He made his debut four days later, in a 1–0 victory over rivals Barnet. Mascoll scored his first Wealdstone goal on 29 January 2022, finding the net from 30 yards in a 2–1 defeat to Grimsby Town.

On 17 May 2022, Mascoll was one of six players released by Wealdstone following the end of the 2021–22 season.

On 7 October 2022, Lewes announced that they had signed Mascoll.

On 4 March 2023, Mascoll signed for Isthmian League Premier division side Hornchurch.

After spending the first half of the 2023–24 season at Cray Wanderers, Mascoll signed for Chatham Town on 10 February 2024.

In August 2024, Mascoll joined fellow Isthmian League Premier Division side Folkestone Invicta.

In early January 2025, Mascoll signed for AFC Whyteleafe, and scored the winning goal for AFC Whyteleafe away to Jersey Bulls on 18 January 2025 - ending Jersey's 22 match unbeaten league run. He helped Whyteleafe to the 2024–25 Combined Counties Premier Division South title, as well as appearing as a substitute in the FA Vase final defeat to Whitstable Town.

In August 2026, Mascoll joined Isthmian League South East Division club Ashford United.

== Career statistics ==
As of match played 1 May 2026

Appearances and goals by club, season and competition
Club	Season	League			National cup		League cup		Other		Total	
Club	Season	Division	Apps	Goals	Apps	Goals	Apps	Goals	Apps	Goals	Apps	Goals
Dulwich Hamlet	2014–15	Isthmian League Premier Division	0	0	0	0	—		3 (Note: Two appearances in the London Senior Cup, one in the Alan Turvey Trophy)	0	3	0
Dulwich Hamlet	2015–16	Isthmian League Premier Division	5	0	0	0	—		3 (Note: Two appearances and one goal in the Alan Turvey Trophy, one in the London Senior Cup)	1	8	1
Dulwich Hamlet	2016–17	Isthmian League Premier Division	3	0	0	0	—		3 (Note: Three appearances in the London Senior Cup)	0	6	0
Dulwich Hamlet	Dulwich Hamlet total		8	0	0	0	—		9	1	17	1
Phoenix Sports (loan)	2015–16	Isthmian League Division One North	11	0	0	0	—		0	0	11	0
Cray Wanderers (loan)	2015–16	Isthmian League Division One North	14	2	0	0	—		0	0	14	2
Grays Athletic (loan)	2016–17	Isthmian League Premier Division	26	0	1	0	—		3 (Note: Two appearances in the FA Trophy, one in the Alan Turvey Trophy)	0	30	0
Charlton Athletic	2017–18	League One	0	0	0	0	0	0	3 (Note: Three appearances in the EFL Trophy)	0	3	0
Charlton Athletic	2018–19	League One	0	0	0	0	1	0	2 (Note: Two appearances and one goal in the EFL Trophy)	1	3	1
Charlton Athletic	Charlton Athletic total		0	0	0	0	1	0	5	1	6	1
Dulwich Hamlet (loan)	2018–19	National League South	11	1	0	0	—		0	0	11	1
Wycombe Wanderers	2019–20	League One	4	0	1	0	1	0	3 (Note: Three appearances in the EFL Trophy)	0	9	0
Bolton Wanderers	2020–21	League Two	7	0	0	0	0	0	2 (Note: Two appearances and one goal in the EFL Trophy)	1	9	1
Waterford (loan)	2021	League of Ireland Premier Division	16	1	—		—		—		16	1
Wealdstone	2021–22	National League	17	1	0	0	—		1 (Note: One appearance in the FA Trophy)	0	18	1
Lewes	2022–23	Isthmian League Premier Division	22	2	0	0	—		3 (Note: Three appearances and one goal in the FA Trophy)	1	25	3
Hornchurch	2022–23	Isthmian League Premier Division	6	1	—		—		2 (Note: Two appearances in the Isthmian League Premier Division Play-Offs)	0	8	1
Cray Wanderers	2023–24	Isthmian League Premier Division	22	1	2	0	—		7 (Note: Three appearances in the FA Trophy, two in the Kent Senior Cup, two in the London Senior Cup)	0	31	1
Chatham Town	2023–24	Isthmian League Premier Division	12	0	—		—		4 (Note: Two appearances in the Velocity Cup and two appearances in the Isthmian League Premier Division Play-Offs)	1	16	1
Folkestone Invicta	2024–25	Isthmian League Premier Division	17	0	1	0	—		4 (Note: Three appearances in the FA Trophy, one appearance in the Kent Senior Cup)	0	22	0
AFC Whyteleafe	2024–25	Combined Counties League Premier Division South	10	2	—		—		6 (Note: Five appearances and two goals in the FA Vase, one appearance in the Cherry Red Records Premier Challenge Cup)	2	16	4
AFC Whyteleafe	2025–26	Isthmian League South East Division	37	5	2	0	—		7 (Note: Two appearances in the FA Trophy, one appearance and one goal in the Alan Turvey Trophy, two appearances and two goals in the Surrey Senior Cup, two appearances in the Isthmian League playoffs)	3	46	8
AFC Whyteleafe	AFC Whyteleafe total		47	7	2	0	0	0	13	5	62	12
Career total			240	16	7	0	2	0	56	10	305	26

== Honours ==
Bolton Wanderers

- EFL League Two third-place (promotion): 2020–21

AFC Whyteleafe

- Combined Counties Premier Division South: 2024–25
- Isthmian League South East Division Play-off (promotion): 2025–26
