= Karlan Grant =

English footballer

- Grant with Charlton Athletic in 2026

Personal information
- Full name: Karlan Laughton Ahearne-Grant
- Date of birth: 18 September 1997 (age 29)
- Place of birth: Thamesmead, England
- Height: 6 ft 0 in (1.83 m)
- Position: Forward

Team information
- Current team: Charlton Athletic
- Number: 9

Youth career
- 2009–2014: Charlton Athletic

Senior career*
Years	Team	Apps	(Gls)
2014–2019	Charlton Athletic	80	(16)
2015–2016	→ Cambridge United (loan)	3	(0)
2017–2018	→ Crawley Town (loan)	15	(9)
2019–2020	Huddersfield Town	56	(23)
2020–2026	West Bromwich Albion	166	(33)
2023–2024	→ Cardiff City (loan)	39	(6)
2026–	Charlton Athletic	15	(2)

International career^{‡}
2014	England U17	3	(0)
2014–2015	England U18	4	(0)
2015	England U19	1	(0)
- * Club domestic league appearances and goals as of 17:10, 21 November 2026 (UTC) ‡ National team caps and goals as of 17:10, 18 July 2026 (UTC)

Karlan Laughton Ahearne-Grant (born 18 September 1997) is an English professional footballer who plays as a forward for EFL Championship club Charlton Athletic. He has represented England at youth level and is also eligible to represent Scotland.

== Club career ==
=== Charlton Athletic (first spell) ===
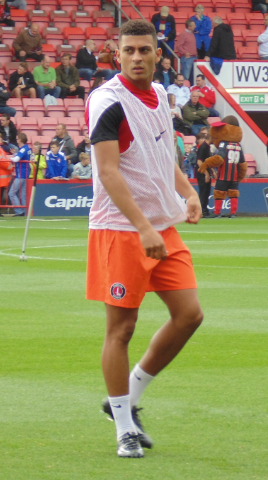
Grant warming-up for Charlton Athletic in 2014

Grant was top scorer for Charlton Athletic U18s during the 2012–13 and 2013–14 seasons while still a schoolboy. Less than a week after his 17th birthday, on 23 September 2014, Grant signed a three-year contract with Charlton. He made his professional debut shortly after on 30 September 2014, as an 89th-minute substitute in a 1–0 victory against Norwich City. He later made his first start on 18 October 2014 in a 1–0 loss against AFC Bournemouth. He scored his first competitive goal for the Addicks first team in a 4–1 Football League Cup win over Dagenham & Redbridge. On 26 September, he scored his first league goal for Charlton in a 2–1 loss to Cardiff City.

==== Loan to Cambridge United ====
On 16 January 2016, Grant signed for League Two club Cambridge United on a one-month loan deal.

==== Loan to Crawley Town ====
On 30 January 2018, Grant joined Crawley Town on loan until the end of the 2017–18 season. He made an immediate impact at the West Sussex club, scoring 8 goals in his first 9 appearances for them. He made 15 appearances in total for Crawley, scoring 9 goals.

=== Huddersfield Town ===
On 30 January 2019, Grant joined Huddersfield Town for an undisclosed fee, signing a contract until the summer of 2022 with the club. He made his debut for the Yorkshire club three days later in a 5–0 away loss to Chelsea where he came on as a substitute. On 9 February 2019, Grant scored his first Huddersfield goal on his second Town appearance in a 2–1 home loss against Arsenal.

=== West Bromwich Albion ===
On 15 October 2020, West Bromwich Albion announced the signing of Grant on a six-year contract for an undisclosed fee, reported to be £15 million.

On 26 October 2020, Grant scored his first league goal for Albion in a 1–1 away draw against Brighton & Hove Albion. In an EFL Cup tie, against Sheffield United, Grant was substituted on and scored the winning goal, but was injured and resubstituted 15 minutes later.

On 15 May 2026, the club said it had offered Grant a new contract.

==== Loan to Cardiff City ====
On 15 July 2023, Grant signed for Championship club Cardiff City on a season-long loan deal.

=== Charlton Athletic (second spell) ===
On 19 July 2026, Grant returned to Charlton Athletic on a free transfer, after signing a two-year deal.

== International career ==
In February 2014, Grant represented England U17 in the Algarve tournament. On 6 November 2014, Grant was called up to the England U18 squad for a double header against Poland. He played for England U19 in September 2015, against Croatia. Grant is also eligible to play for Scotland through his Scottish grandmother.

== Personal life ==
In June 2018, whilst on holiday in Ibiza, Grant was arrested for suspicion of privacy invasion and teammate Reeco Hackett-Fairchild was arrested on suspicion of a sexual assault on a 19-year-old woman. In 2022, both Grant and Hackett-Fairchild were cleared of wrongdoing.

In the summer of 2018, he dropped the Ahearne part of his surname, to become known as Karlan Grant.

== Career statistics ==
As of match played 21 November 2026

Appearances and goals by club, season and competition
Club	Season	League			FA Cup		League Cup		Other		Total	
Club	Season	Division	Apps	Goals	Apps	Goals	Apps	Goals	Apps	Goals	Apps	Goals
Charlton Athletic	2014–15	Championship	5	0	1	0	0	0	—		6	0
Charlton Athletic	2015–16	Championship	17	1	0	0	3	2	—		20	3
Charlton Athletic	2016–17	League One	7	0	0	0	1	0	3 (Note: Appearances in EFL Trophy)	0	11	0
Charlton Athletic	2017–18	League One	23	1	2	1	2	0	5	2	32	4
Charlton Athletic	2018–19	League One	28	14	1	0	0	0	0	0	29	14
Charlton Athletic	Total		80	16	4	1	6	2	8	2	98	21
Cambridge United (loan)	2015–16	League Two	3	0	0	0	—		0	0	3	0
Crawley Town (loan)	2017–18	League Two	15	9	—		—		—		15	9
Huddersfield Town	2018–19	Premier League	13	4	—		—		—		13	4
Huddersfield Town	2019–20	Championship	43	19	1	0	0	0	—		44	19
Huddersfield Town	Total		56	23	1	0	0	0	0	0	57	23
West Bromwich Albion	2020–21	Premier League	21	1	0	0	0	0	—		21	1
West Bromwich Albion	2021–22	Championship	44	18	1	0	0	0	—		45	18
West Bromwich Albion	2022–23	Championship	31	3	2	1	2	1	—		35	5
West Bromwich Albion	2023–24	Championship	0	0	0	0	0	0	—		0	0
West Bromwich Albion	2024–25	Championship	43	7	1	0	0	0	—		44	7
West Bromwich Albion	2025–26	Championship	27	4	1 (Note: Grant was an extra-time substitute in the FA Cup win over Swansea City on 11 January 2026; this was not recorded by Soccerbase)	0	1	0	—		29	4
West Bromwich Albion	Total		166	33	5	1	3	1	0	0	174	35
Cardiff City (loan)	2023–24	Championship	39	6	0	0	1	0	—		40	6
Charlton Athletic	2026–27	Championship	15	2	0	0	1	0	—		16	2
Career total			374	89	10	2	11	3	8	2	403	96
