= George Lapslie =

English footballer (born 1997)

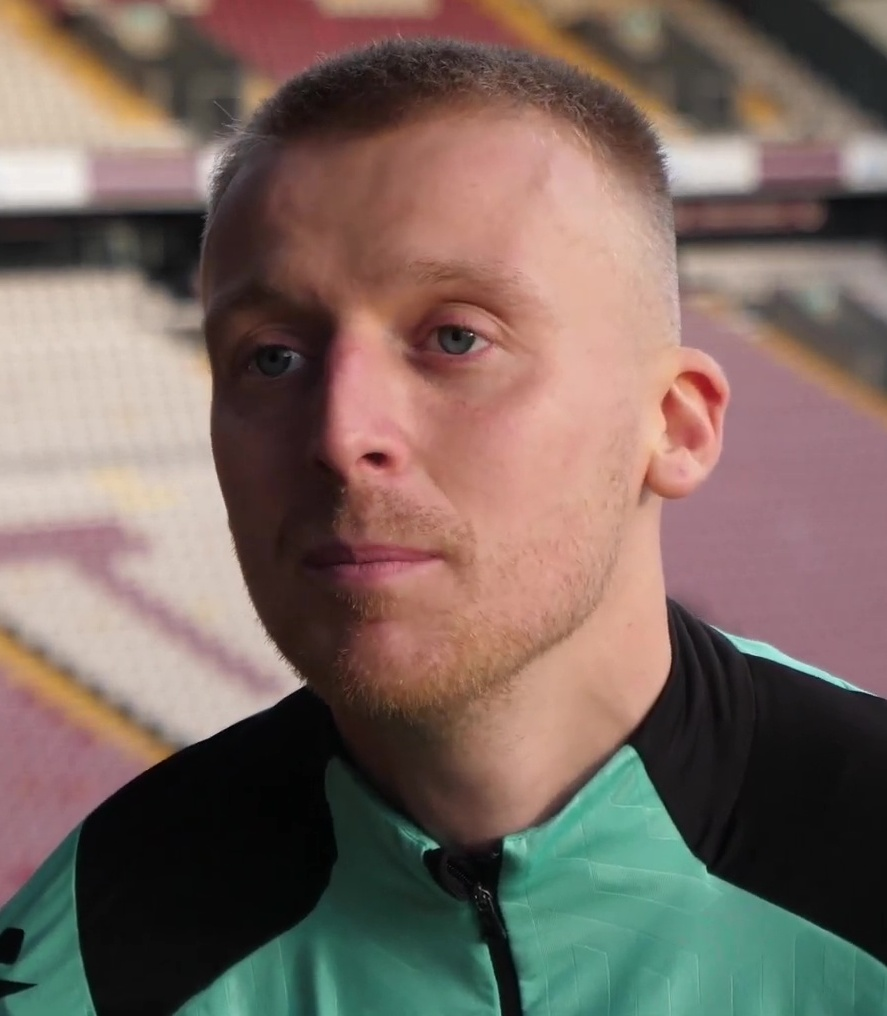
- Lapslie with Bradford City

Personal information
- Full name: George Robert Lapslie
- Date of birth: 5 September 1997 (age 29)
- Place of birth: Waltham Forest, England
- Height: 1.80 m (5 ft 11 in)
- Position: Midfielder

Team information
- Current team: Bradford City
- Number: 32

Youth career
- 2009–2016: Charlton Athletic

Senior career*
Years	Team	Apps	(Gls)
2016–2021	Charlton Athletic	40	(1)
2018	→ Chelmsford City (loan)	0	(0)
2020–2021	→ Mansfield Town (loan)	17	(5)
2021–2023	Mansfield Town	69	(12)
2023–2025	Gillingham	73	(8)
2025–	Bradford City	28	(4)
- * Club domestic league appearances and goals as of 7 November 2026 (UTC)

George Robert Lapslie (born 5 September 1997) is an English professional footballer who plays as a midfielder for EFL League One club Bradford City.

== Career ==
=== Charlton Athletic ===
Lapslie first joined Charlton Athletic in 2009 and quickly progressed through the youth ranks. Lapslie appeared on the bench during Charlton's EFL Trophy tie against Colchester United in November 2016, however, he failed to feature in their 1–1 draw. On 29 August 2017, Lapslie scored on his professional debut against Crawley Town in an EFL Trophy tie.

==== Chelmsford City (loan) ====
On 2 February 2018, Lapslie signed for Chelmsford City on a one-month loan. Lapslie returned to Charlton at the start of March having not made any appearances for Chelmsford.

=== Mansfield Town ===
On 15 October 2020, Lapslie joined Mansfield Town on a season-long loan.

On 19 January 2021, Lapslie's loan move to Mansfield Town was made permanent for an undisclosed fee.

On 4 December 2021, Lapslie scored two goals away at Doncaster Rovers to send Mansfield into the third round of the FA Cup as Mansfield knocked Doncaster out 3–2.

=== Gillingham ===
On 14 January 2023, Lapslie signed for EFL League Two side Gillingham. On 15 May 2024, the club put him on the transfer list.

=== Bradford City ===
In December 2024 it was announced that Lapslie would join Bradford City on 1 January 2025, on a two-and-a-half-year contract. Lapslie was named EFL League Two Player of the Month for March 2025 having been directly involved in six of his side's nine goals across the month. He provided the assist for the 96th minute winner on the last game of the season to secure promotion.

== Personal life ==
His older brother Tom Lapslie is also a professional footballer who plays for Chelmsford City. George attended St Martin's School in Brentwood, Essex where he showed his talent helping them to a National Cup semi-final.

== Career statistics ==
As of match played 9 May 2026

Club	Season	League			FA Cup		EFL Cup		Other		Total	
Club	Season	Division	Apps	Goals	Apps	Goals	Apps	Goals	Apps	Goals	Apps	Goals
Charlton Athletic	2016–17	League One	0	0	0	0	0	0	0	0	0	0
Charlton Athletic	2017–18	League One	1	0	0	0	0	0	4 (Note: Appearance(s) in EFL Trophy)	1	5	1
Charlton Athletic	2018–19	League One	27	0	3	0	0	0	2	1	32	1
Charlton Athletic	2019–20	Championship	10	1	0	0	1	0	0	0	11	1
Charlton Athletic	2020–21	League One	2	0	0	0	2	0	2	0	6	0
Charlton Athletic	Total		40	1	3	0	3	0	8	2	54	3
Chelmsford City (loan)	2017–18	National League South	0	0	0	0	0	0	0	0	0	0
Mansfield Town	2020–21	League Two	29	8	3	1	0	0	0	0	32	9
Mansfield Town	2021–22	League Two	32	4	3	2	1	0	4 (Note: Two appearances in the EFL Trophy and two appearances in the League Two play-offs)	1	40	7
Mansfield Town	2022–23	League Two	25	5	2	1	1	0	4	1	32	7
Mansfield Town	Total		86	17	8	4	2	0	8	2	104	23
Gillingham	2022–23	League Two	22	3	0	0	0	0	0	0	22	3
Gillingham	2023–24	League Two	36	3	2	0	1	0	1	0	40	3
Gillingham	2024–25	League Two	15	2	0	0	1	0	1	0	17	2
Gillingham	Total		73	8	2	0	2	0	2	0	79	8
Bradford City	2024–25	League Two	13	4	0	0	0	0	0	0	13	4
Bradford City	2025–26	League One	12	0	1	0	2	1	5 (Note: Four appearances and one goal in the EFL Trophy and one appearance in the EFL League One play-offs)	1	20	2
Bradford City	Total		25	4	1	0	2	1	5	1	33	6
Career total			224	30	14	4	9	1	23	5	270	40

== Honours ==
Charlton Athletic

- EFL League One play-offs: 2019

Individual

- Charlton Athletic Young Player of the Year: 2018–19
- EFL League Two Player of the Month: March 2025
