= Jo Cummings =

English footballer (born 1998)

Personal information
- Full name: Joseph Theodore Cummings
- Date of birth: 8 September 1998 (age 28)
- Place of birth: Sheffield, England
- Height: 6 ft 2 in (1.88 m)
- Position: Defender

Team information
- Current team: Matlock Town

Youth career
- –2016: Sheffield United

Senior career*
Years	Team	Apps	(Gls)
2016–2017	Sheffield United	0	(0)
2017–2019	Charlton Athletic	0	(0)
2018–2019	→ Guiseley (loan)	5	(0)
2019–2020	Scunthorpe United	0	(0)
2020	→ Radcliffe (loan)	2	(1)
2020–2021	Radcliffe	0	(0)
2021–2022	Sheffield	2	(0)
2022	Spennymoor Town	5	(0)
2022–2023	Boston United	13	(1)
2023–2026	FC Halifax Town	20	(1)
2026	→ Alfreton Town (loan)	17	(4)
2026–	Matlock Town	0	(0)
- * Club domestic league appearances and goals as of 22:10, 22 December 2024 (UTC)

Joseph Theodore Cummings (born 8 September 1998) is an English professional footballer who plays as a defender for Northern Premier League Divison One East side Matlock Town.

== Career ==
Cummings came through the Academy at Sheffield United to make his senior debut for the "Blades" after coming on for Chris Basham 76 minutes into a 4–2 victory over Grimsby Town in an EFL Trophy match on 9 November 2016.

Cummings joined Charlton Athletic in May 2017. On 17 October 2018, Cummings joined National League North side Guiseley on a one-month loan deal.

Cummings joined Scunthorpe United on 8 July 2019, after being released by Charlton Athletic. On 6 March 2020, Cummings joined Radcliffe on loan until the end of the 2019/20 season.

On 20 June 2020, Cummings joined Radcliffe on a permanent basis after being released by Scunthorpe United.

On 24 June 2022, Cummings joined National League North side Spennymoor Town.

On 19 November 2022, Cummings signed for fellow National League North side Boston United.

On 26 July 2023, Cummings joined National League club FC Halifax Town following his release from Boston United.

Cummings signed for Northern Premier League Divison One East side Matlock Town ahead of the 2026–27 season.

== Statistics ==
As of match played 14 March 2020

Appearances and goals by club, season and competition
Club	Season	League			FA Cup		EFL Cup		Other		Total	
Club	Season	Division	Apps	Goals	Apps	Goals	Apps	Goals	Apps	Goals	Apps	Goals
Sheffield United	2016–17	League One	0	0	0	0	0	0	1 (Note: One appearance in the EFL Trophy)	0	1	0
Charlton Athletic	2017–18	League One	0	0	0	0	0	0	1 (Note: One appearance in the EFL Trophy)	0	1	0
Charlton Athletic	2018–19	League One	0	0	0	0	1	0	0	0	1	0
Charlton Athletic	Total		0	0	0	0	1	0	1	0	2	0
Guiseley (loan)	2018–19	National League North	5	0	1	0	0	0	0	0	6	0
Scunthorpe United	2019–20	League Two	0	0	0	0	0	0	0	0	0	0
Radcliffe (loan)	2019–20	Northern Premier League Premier Division	2	1	0	0	0	0	0	0	2	1
Radcliffe	2020–21	Northern Premier League Premier Division	0	0	0	0	0	0	0	0	0	0
Radcliffe	Total		2	1	0	0	0	0	0	0	2	1
Career total			7	1	1	0	1	0	2	0	11	1
