= Kenneth Yao =

Ivorian professional footballer (born 1998)

Personal information
- Full name: Kenneth William Yao
- Date of birth: 5 September 1998 (age 28)
- Place of birth: Lewisham, England
- Position: Defender

Youth career
- –2018: Charlton Athletic

Senior career*
Years	Team	Apps	(Gls)
2018–2020	Charlton Athletic	0	(0)
2018	→ Dartford (loan)	2	(0)
2021–2022	Lewes	18	(0)
- * Club domestic league appearances and goals as of 17:10, 27 November 2022 (UTC)

Kenneth William Yao (born 5 September 1998) is an Ivorian professional footballer who plays as a defender for Lewes.

== Career ==
Originating from Ivory Coast, Yao signed his first professional contract with Charlton Athletic in May 2016 and went onto make his first-team debut during their EFL Cup tie against AFC Wimbledon, featuring for the entire 90 minutes in the 2–2 draw.

On 17 September 2018, Yao joined Dartford on loan until 20 October 2018.

On 2 July 2020, it was confirmed that Yao had left Charlton after his contract expired.

In the summer of 2021, he joined Isthmian League Premier Division side on a free transfer.

== Career statistics ==
As of 17 September 2022.

Appearances and goals by club, season and competition
Club	Season	League			FA Cup		League Cup		Other		Total	
Club	Season	Division	Apps	Goals	Apps	Goals	Apps	Goals	Apps	Goals	Apps	Goals
Charlton Athletic	2018–19	League One	0	0	0	0	1	0	2 (Note: Two appearances in the EFL Trophy.)	0	3	0
Charlton Athletic	2019–20	Championship	0	0	0	0	0	0	0	0	0	0
Charlton Athletic	Charlton Athletic total		0	0	0	0	1	0	2	0	3	0
Dartford (loan)	2018–19	National League South	2	0	1	0	0	0	0	0	3	0
Dartford (loan)	Dartford total		2	0	1	0	0	0	0	0	3	0
Lewes	2021–22	Isthmian League Premier Division	17	0	1	0	—		1 (Note: One appearance in the FA Trophy)	0	19	0
Lewes	2022–23	Isthmian League Premier Division	1	0	3	0	—		0	0	4	0
Lewes	Lewes total		18	0	4	0	0	0	1	0	23	0
Career total			20	0	5	0	1	0	3	0	29	0
