= Billy Clarke (footballer, born 1987) =

Irish footballer

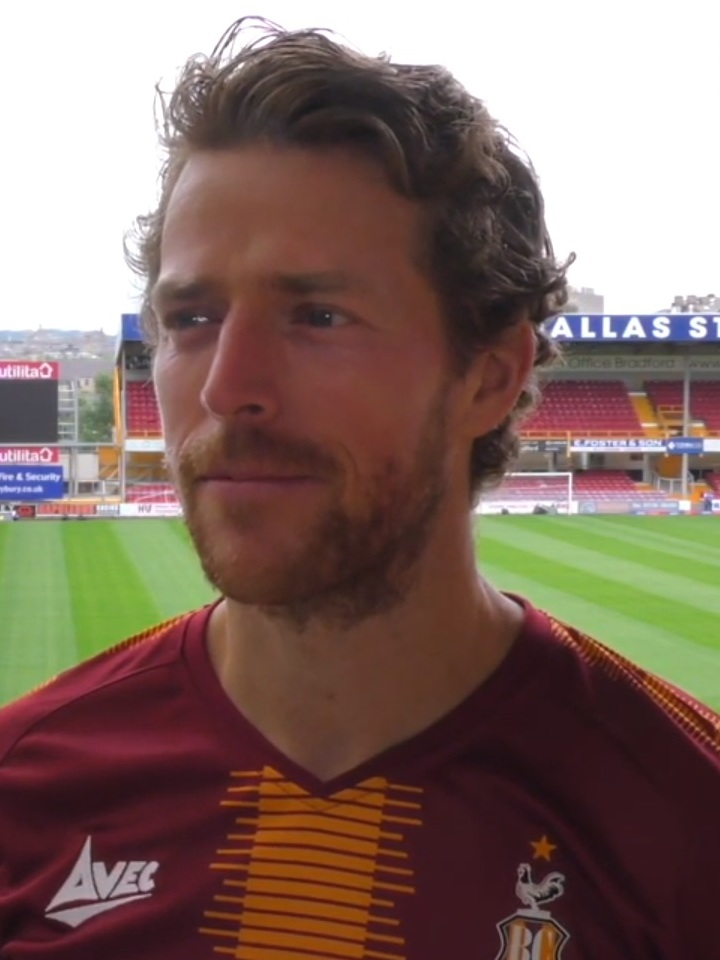
- Clarke in 2020

Personal information
- Full name: William Charles Clarke
- Date of birth: 13 December 1987 (age 38)
- Place of birth: Cork, Ireland
- Height: 1.70 m (5 ft 7 in)
- Position: Striker

Team information
- Current team: Hull City (under-18s assistant manager)

Youth career
- 2003–2005: Ipswich Town

Senior career*
| Years | Team | Apps | (Gls) |
| 2005–2009 | Ipswich Town | 49 | (3) |
| 2006 | → Colchester United (loan) | 6 | (0) |
| 2008 | → Falkirk (loan) | 8 | (1) |
| 2008 | → Darlington (loan) | 20 | (8) |
| 2009 | → Northampton Town (loan) | 5 | (3) |
| 2009 | → Brentford (loan) | 8 | (5) |
| 2009–2012 | Blackpool | 27 | (1) |
| 2011 | → Sheffield United (loan) | 5 | (1) |
| 2012–2014 | Crawley Town | 82 | (20) |
| 2014–2017 | Bradford City | 98 | (24) |
| 2017–2019 | Charlton Athletic | 17 | (1) |
| 2019 | Bradford City | 14 | (1) |
| 2019–2020 | Plymouth Argyle | 9 | (0) |
| 2020 | Grimsby Town | 13 | (2) |
| 2020–2021 | Bradford City | 29 | (2) |
| Total | | 390 | (72) |

International career
| 2003 | Republic of Ireland U17 | 2 | (0) |
| 2005–2006 | Republic of Ireland U19 | 8 | (6) |
| 2007–2008 | Republic of Ireland U21 | 11 | (1) |
- * Club domestic league appearances and goals

William Charles Clarke (born 13 December 1987) is an Irish football coach and former footballer who is the assistant manager of Hull City under 18s team.

As a player Clarke was predominantly a striker as well as playing in midfield in a career that lasted from 2003 until 2021. He most notably had three spells with Bradford City and was also part of the Blackpool team that played in the Premier League during the 2010–11 season. Clarke also had spells with Ipswich Town, Crawley Town, Charlton Athletic, Plymouth Argyle and Grimsby Town as well as spending time on loan with Colchester United, Falkirk, Darlington, Northampton Town, Brentford and Sheffield United. He played for Ireland at various levels up to under-21.

== Club career ==
=== Ipswich Town ===
Born in Cork, Clarke is a product of the Ipswich Town Academy and signed professional for the club in May 2005. He made his professional début as a substitute against Cardiff City in late November 2005. He won the Irish Examiner Junior Sports Star of the year award for Soccer in 2005 and was nominated for the Irish Under-19 Player of the Year award in 2006. He also made a big contribution to Ipswich's youth team in winning the FA Youth Cup in 2005.

At the end of the 2005–06 season he was sent on loan to Colchester United to gain first team experience, playing six league games. During the January 2008 transfer window, he joined Scottish side Falkirk on loan. He scored his first goal, a late winner, in a crucial match against Inverness Caledonian Thistle.

After returning to Ipswich Clarke scored his first league goal in the 2–1 victory over Southampton and followed it up three days later with the winning goal in the 2–1 victory over Coventry City. He also scored in a 3–1 victory over Southend United.

Clarke was transfer-listed and on 8 August 2008 went to Darlington on one month's loan, which was extended to January 2009. He scored four times against Macclesfield Town on 30 August 2008. He also scored a vital goal in the League Cup against Walsall, knocking the League One side out of the cup.

He joined Northampton Town on a month's loan in January 2009. He scored a hat-trick on his debut in a 5–1 victory over Crewe Alexandra. It was the first hat-trick scored by a Cobblers player since 2002.

Clarke joined Brentford on loan in the run-in to their attempt to win promotion out of League Two. He was recruited mainly to cover for the absence of fellow Ipswich loanee Jordan Rhodes, who was injured. Clarke scored his first goal for the Bees in the 1–1 draw at Bradford City. He ended his loan spell scoring six goals in eight games. While at Brentford, he scored twice against former club Darlington in the game that Brentford clinched the league two title. He had scored 18 goals overall during his three loan spells that season with Darlington, Northampton and Brentford. He was nominated twice during the season for the League Two Player of the Month.

Clarke was released by new Ipswich manager Roy Keane on 8 May 2009.

=== Blackpool ===
On 26 June 2009, Clarke signed for fellow Championship side Blackpool on a two-year contract with an option for a further year; his contract starting on 1 July, once his Ipswich contract expired. Clarke said of the move, "It happened very quickly. I met the manager (Ian Holloway) on Tuesday and I had my medical this morning. I am delighted to be here and I can't wait for the season to start," adding "It is brilliant for me to be still playing in the Championship.

His first game for the Seasiders was a pre-season friendly against non-league side Burscough on 11 July. Two days later he scored the second goal as Blackpool beat Barnstaple Town 5–0 in a 2009 South West Challenge Cup group stage match.

On 8 August Clarke made his league début as a 73rd-minute substitute as Blackpool started the 2009–10 season with a 1–1 draw with Queens Park Rangers at Loftus Road. He scored his first goal for the Seasiders in a 4–3 defeat to Stoke City at the Britannia Stadium in the third round of the 2009–10 League Cup on 22 September. His first league start came in the 2–0 win over Plymouth Argyle at Bloomfield Road on 17 October. His first league goal came after just 23 seconds of the West Lancashire derby 1–1 draw with Preston North End on 30 November. He also won the Sky Sports "Man of the Match" award for his performance.

After three months out through injury, Clarke made his return to action as a 78th-minute substitute in the 1–0 home win over his former club Ipswich Town on 6 March 2010. During pre-season for the 2010–11 season, which was Blackpool's début in the Premier League, Clarke suffered a knee injury that would, it was initially thought, keep him out of action for three months; however, on 26 July it was revealed that Clarke had ruptured his right anterior cruciate ligament and could miss the whole campaign. This was confirmed when, on 2 February 2011, he was left out of Blackpool's 25-man squad for the remainder of the campaign. The club exercised a third year option on Clarke's contract, keeping him in the squad for the 2011–12 season. With first team opportunities proving limited Clarke agreed a month's loan to Sheffield United in October 2011, going on to make five appearances and score one goal for the South Yorkshire club.

=== Crawley Town ===
On 31 January 2012, Clarke joined League Two club Crawley Town for an undisclosed fee. The signing of Clarke was seen as a signal of intent from Crawley, who beat off the interest of several other clubs. Crawley boss Steve Evans called Clarke a wonderful signing. Clarke featured as a regular first team player in both 2012/2013 and 2013/2014 seasons and missed a number of games due to injury. He won Player of the Year award in the 2012–13 season, scoring 14 goals in League One for Crawley. He scored 7 goals for Crawley in the 2013–14 season.

=== Bradford City ===
Clarke signed for Bradford City in June 2014 on a two-year deal. He made his debut on 9 August in a 3–2 win against Coventry City at Valley Parade, assisting James Hanson's opening goal of the game.

=== Charlton Athletic ===
Clarke signed for Charlton Athletic in June 2017 on a two-year deal. He scored his first goal for Charlton in a 2-1 EFL Cup win against Exeter City on 8 August 2017. In December 2017 Clarke suffered another serious knee injury, rupturing the anterior cruciate ligament of his left knee.

=== Return to Bradford ===
Clarke returned to Bradford City on 31 January 2019. In May 2019, following Bradford City's relegation to League Two, it was announced that he would leave the club upon the expiry of his contract on 30 June 2019, one of 11 players to be released. He did not find a new club for the start of the 2019–20 season, but trained with Bolton Wanderers. In September 2019 he said that he was still looking for a new club, after the move to Bolton fell through following the departure of manager Phil Parkinson, and also said that he was missing playing. He still worked at Bradford City as a part-time under-15s coach, two nights a week.

=== Plymouth Argyle ===
On 19 October 2019, Clarke signed with League Two side Plymouth Argyle on a short-term deal. He made his debut that day, as an 80th-minute substitute for George Cooper in a 2–0 win over Carlisle United.

=== Grimsby Town ===
After being released by Plymouth, Grimsby Town signed Clarke on a six-month contract on 9 January 2020. On the 11 January 2020 Clarke, makes his debut for Grimsby Town FC against Leyton Orient, after coming on for Ahkeem Rose in 63rd minute, He subsequently scored minutes later to make the score 1–0.

=== Third spell at Bradford City ===
Clarke re-signed for Bradford City on a one-year deal on 16 July 2020. On 12 May 2021 he was one of nine players that Bradford City announced would leave the club on 30 June 2021 when their contracts expire.

== International career ==
Clarke played at various levels for the Republic of Ireland. He has made 45 appearances at under-16, under-17, under-18, under-19 and under-21 scoring 14 goals. In May 2008 he played in the inaugural Intercontinental Cup in Malaysia.

== Coaching career ==
Clarke announced his retirement from professional football on 30 August 2021, after making 390 appearances and scoring 89 goals at club level across 16 seasons. In his retirement announcement, Clarke also announced his intention of a coaching career. On 20 September 2021, Clarke joined Hull City as under-18s assistant manager.

== Career statistics ==
As of match played 8 May 2021

Appearances and goals by club, season and competition
| Club | Season | League | | | FA Cup | | League Cup | | Other | | Total | |
| Club | Season | Division | Apps | Goals | Apps | Goals | Apps | Goals | Apps | Goals | Apps | Goals |
|---|---|---|---|---|---|---|---|---|---|---|---|---|
| Ipswich Town | 2005–06 | Championship | 2 | 0 | 0 | 0 | 0 | 0 | — | | 2 | 0 |
| Ipswich Town | 2006–07 | Championship | 27 | 3 | 4 | 0 | 1 | 1 | — | | 32 | 4 |
| Ipswich Town | 2007–08 | Championship | 20 | 0 | 1 | 0 | 1 | 0 | — | | 22 | 0 |
| Ipswich Town | Total | | 49 | 3 | 5 | 0 | 2 | 1 | 0 | 0 | 56 | 4 |
| Colchester United (loan) | 2005–06 | League One | 6 | 0 | 0 | 0 | 0 | 0 | 0 | 0 | 6 | 0 |
| Falkirk (loan) | 2007–08 | Scottish Premier League | 8 | 1 | 0 | 0 | 0 | 0 | — | | 8 | 1 |
| Darlington (loan) | 2008–09 | League Two | 20 | 8 | 1 | 0 | 2 | 1 | 2 (Note: Appearance(s) in Football League Trophy) | 0 | 25 | 9 |
| Northampton Town (loan) | 2008–09 | League One | 5 | 3 | 0 | 0 | 0 | 0 | 0 | 0 | 5 | 3 |
| Brentford (loan) | 2008–09 | League One | 8 | 5 | 0 | 0 | 0 | 0 | 0 | 0 | 8 | 5 |
| Blackpool | 2009–10 | Championship | 18 | 1 | 0 | 0 | 3 | 1 | 0 | 0 | 21 | 2 |
| Blackpool | 2010–11 | Premier League | 0 | 0 | 0 | 0 | 0 | 0 | — | | 0 | 0 |
| Blackpool | 2011–12 | Championship | 9 | 0 | 1 | 0 | 1 | 0 | 0 | 0 | 11 | 0 |
| Blackpool | Total | | 27 | 1 | 1 | 0 | 4 | 1 | 0 | 0 | 32 | 2 |
| Sheffield United (loan) | 2011–12 | League One | 5 | 1 | 0 | 0 | 0 | 0 | 1 | 0 | 6 | 1 |
| Crawley Town | 2011–12 | League Two | 17 | 3 | 0 | 0 | 0 | 0 | 0 | 0 | 17 | 3 |
| Crawley Town | 2012–13 | League One | 36 | 10 | 3 | 2 | 3 | 1 | 2 | 1 | 44 | 14 |
| Crawley Town | 2013–14 | League One | 29 | 7 | 1 | 0 | 1 | 0 | 0 | 0 | 31 | 7 |
| Crawley Town | Total | | 82 | 20 | 4 | 2 | 4 | 1 | 2 | 1 | 92 | 24 |
| Bradford City | 2014–15 | League One | 36 | 13 | 6 | 1 | 3 | 0 | 1 | 0 | 46 | 14 |
| Bradford City | 2015–16 | League One | 29 | 4 | 5 | 0 | 1 | 0 | 1 (Note: Appearance in League One play-offs) | 0 | 36 | 4 |
| Bradford City | 2016–17 | League One | 33 | 7 | 1 | 0 | 1 | 0 | 5 (Note: Two appearances in EFL Trophy, three in League One play-offs) | 0 | 40 | 7 |
| Bradford City | Total | | 98 | 24 | 12 | 1 | 5 | 0 | 7 | 0 | 122 | 25 |
| Charlton Athletic | 2017–18 | League One | 17 | 1 | 1 | 0 | 2 | 1 | 1 (Note: One appearance in EFL Trophy) | 0 | 21 | 2 |
| Charlton Athletic | 2018–19 | League One | 0 | 0 | 3 | 0 | 0 | 0 | 1 | 0 | 4 | 0 |
| Charlton Athletic | Total | | 17 | 1 | 4 | 0 | 2 | 1 | 2 | 0 | 25 | 2 |
| Bradford City | 2018–19 | League One | 14 | 1 | 0 | 0 | 0 | 0 | 0 | 0 | 14 | 1 |
| Bradford City | Total | | 14 | 1 | 0 | 0 | 0 | 0 | 0 | 0 | 14 | 1 |
| Plymouth Argyle | 2019–20 | League Two | 9 | 0 | 2 | 0 | 0 | 0 | 1 | 0 | 12 | 0 |
| Grimsby Town | 2019–20 | League Two | 13 | 2 | 0 | 0 | 0 | 0 | 0 | 0 | 13 | 2 |
| Bradford City | 2020–21 | League Two | 29 | 2 | 2 | 2 | 1 | 0 | 0 | 0 | 32 | 4 |
| Career total | | | 390 | 72 | 31 | 5 | 20 | 5 | 15 | 1 | 456 | 83 |

== Honours ==
Blackpool

- Football League Championship play-offs: 2010

Crawley Town

- Football League Two third-place promotion: 2011–12

Individual

- Ipswich Town Young Player of the Year: 2004–05
