= Toby Stevenson (footballer) =

English footballer (born 1999)

Personal information
- Full name: Toby James Stevenson
- Date of birth: 22 November 1999 (age 26)
- Place of birth: Colchester, England
- Position: Defender

Team information
- Current team: Chatham Town

Youth career
- –2017: Leyton Orient

Senior career*
Years	Team	Apps	(Gls)
2017–2018	Leyton Orient	0	(0)
2017–2018	→ Heybridge Swifts (loan)	23	(0)
2018–2020	Charlton Athletic	3	(0)
2019–2020	→ Dagenham & Redbridge (loan)	10	(0)
2020–2021	Watford	0	(0)
2021–2022	Bromley	1	(0)
2021	→ Braintree Town (loan)	1	(0)
2021–2022	→ Billericay Town (loan)	23	(1)
2022–2023	Billericay Town	38	(4)
2023–2024	Braintree Town	8	(1)
2024	Margate	14	(0)
2024–	Chatham Town	0	(0)
- * Club domestic league appearances and goals as of 13:26, 17 June 2024 (UTC)

Toby James Stevenson (born 22 November 1999) is an English professional footballer who plays as a defender for Isthmian League Premier Division club Chatham Town.

== Career ==
Born in Colchester, Essex, Stevenson started his career in the youth team of Leyton Orient. In November 2017 he was sent out on a work-experience loan to Isthmian League North Division side Heybridge Swifts. He made his debut against Kingstonian in a 2–2 draw in the FA Trophy. He went on to make twenty-three appearances for the Essex side, where he stayed until 2018. In May 2018, Orient announced that he would not be offered a professional contract following the end of his scholarship, although manager Martin Ling stated that he would have been retained if the club still had an under-23 team.

He subsequently joined Charlton Athletic development squad after impressing on trial against Crystal Palace in the under-18 play-off final. On 10 October 2018 he became the first Charlton player to score a hat-trick on debut following the record 8–0 win away at Stevenage in the EFL Trophy. He went onto make another six appearances that season as Charlton were promoted to the EFL Championship following the play-off victory over Sunderland. In May 2019, Charlton announced that his contract had been extended by a further year. On 2 November 2019 he was sent out on loan to National League side Dagenham & Redbridge on a one-month youth loan and made his debut on that day in a 2–1 away defeat to Solihull Moors. His loan was extended on 5 December 2019 until 11 January 2020. On 3 January 2020, Stevenson was recalled by Charlton.

On 2 July 2020, it was confirmed that Stevenson had left Charlton after his contract expired. Stevenson signed a one-year deal with Watford on 15 September, with the option of a further year.

Following his release from Watford, Stevenson joined National League side Bromley and subsequently joined Braintree Town on a month's loan at the end of September, where he made his debut in a 6–0 defeat to Eastbourne Borough on 25 September 2021.

On Tuesday 26 October 2021 Toby joined Billericay Town on a one month loan.

On 31 May 2022, it was confirmed that Stevenson would leave Bromley following the end of his contract.

After spending the 2022–23 campaign back at Billericay Town, Stevenson returned to Braintree Town in June 2023. In February 2024, Stevenson joined Isthmian League Premier Division strugglers Margate.

Following Margate's relegation at the end of the 2023–24 season, Stevenson remained in the Isthmian Premier Division, joining Chatham Town in June 2024.

== Career statistics ==
As of end of 2023–24 season

Appearances and goals by club, season and competition
Club	Season	League			FA Cup		EFL Cup		Other		Total	
Club	Season	Division	Apps	Goals	Apps	Goals	Apps	Goals	Apps	Goals	Apps	Goals
Leyton Orient	2017–18	National League	0	0	0	0	—		0	0	0	0
Heybridge Swifts (loan)	2017–18	Isthmian League North Division	23	0	—		—		0	0	23	0
Charlton Athletic	2018–19	League One	3	0	3	1	0	0	1 (Note: Appearances in EFL Trophy)	3	7	4
Charlton Athletic	2019–20	Championship	0	0	1	0	0	0	—		1	0
Charlton Athletic	Total		3	0	4	1	0	0	1	3	8	4
Dagenham & Redbridge (loan)	2019–20	National League	10	0	—		—		2 (Note: Appearances in FA Trophy)	0	12	0
Watford	2020–21	Championship	0	0	0	0	2	0	—		2	0
Bromley	2021–22	National League	1	0	0	0	—		0	0	1	0
Braintree Town (loan)	2021–22	National League South	1	0	—		—		0	0	1	0
Billericay Town (loan)	2021–22	National League South	23	1	—		—		2 (Note: Appearances in Essex Senior Cup)	0	25	1
Billericay Town	2022–23	Isthmian League Premier Division	38	4	4	1	—		3	0	45	5
Billericay Town	Total		61	5	4	1	0	0	5	0	70	6
Braintree Town	2023–24	National League South	8	1	3	0	—		0	0	11	1
Margate	2023–24	Isthmian League Premier Division	14	0	—		—		0	0	14	0
Chatham Town	2024–25	Isthmian League Premier Division	0	0	0	0	—		0	0	0	0
Career total			121	6	11	2	2	0	8	3	142	11

== Honours ==
Billericay Town

- Essex Senior Cup: 2021–22
