= Mikhail Kennedy =

Northern Irish footballer

Personal information
- Full name: Mikhail Caolan Patrick Kennedy
- Date of birth: 18 August 1996 (age 30)
- Place of birth: Derry, Northern Ireland
- Height: 1.78 m (5 ft 10 in)
- Position: Forward

Team information
- Current team: Limavady United
- Number: 10

Youth career
- –2014: Charlton Athletic

Senior career*
Years	Team	Apps	(Gls)
2014–2019	Charlton Athletic	2	(0)
2014	→ VCD Athletic (loan)	2	(1)
2015	→ VCD Athletic (loan)	3	(1)
2017	→ Derry City (loan)	9	(0)
2018–2019	→ Chelmsford City (loan)	7	(1)
2019	→ Concord Rangers (loan)	3	(0)
2021–2023	Dergview	55	(21)
2023–2024	Crusaders	7	(0)
2024–2025	Institute	36	(17)
2025–	Limavady United	31	(4)

International career
2012–2013	Northern Ireland U17	4	(2)
2013–2014	Northern Ireland U19	3	(0)
2015–2016	Northern Ireland U21	7	(1)
- * Club domestic league appearances and goals as of 29 April 2026

Mikhail Caolan Patrick Kennedy (born 18 August 1996) is a Northern Irish professional footballer who plays as a forward for NIFL Championship side Limavady United . He also represented his country up to under-21 level.

He played four professional matches for English Football League club Charlton Athletic, scoring once on his debut. He was loaned to several non-league and Irish teams before retiring from professional football at age 23 due to injury in 2020.

== Club career ==
Born in Derry, Kennedy was in Charlton Athletic's under-18 team, and then their under-21 side for the 2014–15 season, under the management of Jason Euell. On 10 December 2014, he signed a professional contract until the summer of 2015. Later that month, he was loaned to nearby VCD Athletic of the Isthmian League, where he scored within three minutes of his debut in a 1–1 draw at Hendon on the 13th. On 16 January 2015, he returned to VCD on a month-long loan.

Kennedy was first included in a Charlton matchday squad on 16 August 2015, remaining an unused substitute in their 2–1 Championship win over Hull City at The Valley. Nine days later, he made his debut in the second round of the League Cup, opening a 4–1 win away to Peterborough United with a third-minute goal. On 19 September, Kennedy made his first appearance in The Football League, playing the first 61 minutes of a 3–0 loss at Blackburn Rovers before being replaced by Igor Vetokele. In December 2015, he extended his contract by two and a half years.

On 15 February 2017, Kennedy was loaned to hometown team Derry City of the League of Ireland until June. He did not score during his time at the Brandywell Stadium, with manager Kenny Shiels preferring to play Nathan Boyle as a lone striker.

He signed a new six-month contract with Charlton at the end of the 2017–18 season. On 26 December 2018, Chelmsford City announced the signing of Kennedy on a one-month loan deal. He played seven games for the National League South club and scored in his last, a 3–1 win at Dulwich Hamlet on 26 January 2019.

On 28 March 2019, Kennedy joined Concord Rangers on loan for a month, again in the National League South. He was released by Charlton in May, and in July he trialled at Institute in his hometown.

In May 2020, over a year after last playing, Kennedy stated that - following medical advice - he would be retiring from professional football at the age of just 23.

However, in August 2021, Kennedy signed for semi-professional NIFL Championship team Dergview.

In May 2023, it was announced that Kennedy would join NIFL Premiership side Crusaders.

=== Institute ===
He signed for NIFL Championship club Institute on 4 January 2024. Kennedy scored on his debut for the club in a 2-1 league win over league leaders Dundela.

== International career ==
Kennedy played for Northern Ireland's under-17 team in 2013 UEFA European Under-17 Championship qualification, scoring in two elite round games as they finished last in their group. On 21 March 2013, two minutes after replacing Ross Lavery, he scored as Northern Ireland came from behind to draw 2–2 with the Netherlands in Uden. Two days later, he equalised in a 2–1 loss to Norway.

On 5 September 2015, Kennedy scored in the seventh minute of a 2017 European Championship qualifier for Northern Ireland under-21, albeit in a 1–2 loss to Scotland.
