= 2019 EFL League One play-off final =

Association football match between Charlton Athletic and Sunderland in 2019

- The match took place at Wembley Stadium.
- Event: 2018–19 EFL League One
Charlton Athletic	Sunderland
2	1
- Date: 26 May 2019
- Venue: Wembley Stadium, London
- Referee: Andrew Madley
- Attendance: 76,155

The 2019 EFL League One play-off final was an association football match which was played on 26 May 2019 at Wembley Stadium, London, between Charlton Athletic and Sunderland to determine the third and final team to gain promotion from EFL League One to the EFL Championship. The top two teams of the 2018–19 EFL League One season gained automatic promotion to the Championship, while the teams placed from third to sixth place in the table partook in play-off semi-finals; the winners of these semi-finals competed for the final place for the 2019–20 season in the Championship.

Sunderland had reached the play-off final in their first season back in the third tier of English football, having been relegated from the Premier League in the 2016–17 season and the Championship in the 2017–18 season. The two clubs had faced one another in a play-off final before, in the 1998 Football League First Division play-off final, making it the first time in the history of the play-off format that a fixture had been repeated. The 2019 final was watched by a crowd of more than 76,000 people and refereed by Andrew Madley. Sunderland took the lead early in the first half when Charlton's Mouhamadou-Naby Sarr scored an own goal. The equaliser for Charlton came from Ben Purrington before half time, and Patrick Bauer scored the winning goal late into additional time in the second half, ending the match 2–1 to Charlton.

Sunderland started their next season in League One which was temporarily suspended as a result of the COVID-19 pandemic. After the season was curtailed, they finished in eighth position on points-per-game. Charlton's first season back in the EFL Championship was also interrupted by the pandemic, and after resumption, the club ended the season in 22nd position and were relegated back to League One.

== Route to the final ==
Football League One final table, leading positions
Pos	Team	Pld	W	D	L	GF	GA	GD	Pts
1	Luton Town	46	27	13	6	90	42	+48	94
2	Barnsley	46	26	13	7	80	39	+41	91
3	Charlton Athletic	46	26	10	10	73	40	+33	88
4	Portsmouth	46	25	13	8	83	51	+32	88
5	Sunderland	46	22	19	5	80	47	+33	85
6	Doncaster Rovers	46	20	13	13	76	58	+18	73

Charlton Athletic finished the regular 2018–19 season in third place in EFL League One, the third tier of the English football league system, two places ahead of Sunderland. Both therefore missed out on the two automatic places for promotion to the EFL Championship and instead took part in the play-offs to determine the third promoted team. Charlton finished three points behind Barnsley (who were promoted in second place) and six behind league winners Luton Town. Sunderland ended the season three points behind Charlton, but having lost only five games, one fewer than the champions.

Sunderland faced Portsmouth their play-off semi-final. The first leg was played at Sunderland's home ground, the Stadium of Light. Chris Maguire, who had been on the pitch for four minutes after coming on as a second-half substitute, volleyed Matt Clarke's attempted clearance into the Portsmouth net from 15 yards (14 m) to give Sunderland the lead. Soon after, Alim Öztürk was sent off for a foul on Gareth Evans, and the resulting free kick struck the Sunderland bar. Maguire hit the post but the game ended 1–0 to Sunderland. The second leg, held five days later at Fratton Park, saw seven yellow cards shown, five to Portsmouth players. The match ended goalless and Sunderland progressed to the final 1–0 on aggregate.

Charlton's opponents in their play-off semi-final were Doncaster Rovers. The first leg held at Doncaster's Keepmoat Stadium. Lyle Taylor's header put Charlton into the lead after 32 minutes. They doubled their lead soon after when Joe Aribo scored from a Taylor pass. Matty Blair scored for Doncaster with three minutes remaining and the game ended 2–1 to Charlton. The second leg, played at The Valley, saw Charlton extend their aggregate lead to 3–1 after two minutes with a Krystian Bielik goal, but nine minutes later, Tommy Rowe equalised the game. With two minutes of regular time remaining, Doncaster's Andy Butler scored with a header to make it 3–3 on aggregate, sending the match into extra time. Doncaster's John Marquis scored ten minutes into the first period, but Darren Pratley's headed goal a minute later made it 4–4 and sent the game to a penalty shootout. Charlton's goalkeeper Dillon Phillips saved Marquis' penalty, before Mouhamadou-Naby Sarr failed to score. Rowe's subsequent miss meant the shootout ended 4–3 and Charlton qualified for the play-off final.

Charlton Athletic			Round	Sunderland
Opponent	Result	Legs	Semi-finals	Opponent	Result	Legs
Doncaster Rovers	4–4 (4–3 p.)	2–1 away; 2–3 (a.e.t.) home		Portsmouth	1–0	1–0 home; 0–0 away

== Match ==
=== Background ===
Charlton had previously made two appearances in play-off finals. In the 1987 Football League Second Division play-off final, they beat Leeds United in a replay after the two-legged final ended 1–1 on aggregate, retaining their top-tier status. In the 1998 Football League First Division play-off final, Charlton faced Sunderland at the old Wembley Stadium in a match described by Rob Stevens of the BBC as "arguably the best play-off final in English Football League history". That final ended 3–3 in regular time, 4–4 after extra time, and Charlton won the resulting penalty shootout 7–6. As well as the 1998 final, Sunderland had appeared in the 1990 Football League Second Division play-off final against Swindon Town which they lost 1–0. They were promoted however, as Swindon were later found guilty of financial misconduct. During the 2018–19 regular league season, Sunderland had beaten Charlton 2–1 in the opening match at the Stadium of Light in August, while the return fixture at The Valley in January 2019 ended in a 1–1 draw.

The Montserrat international Lyle Taylor was Charlton's top scorer for the season with 21 goals and 9 assists, while Josh Maja was Sunderland's most prolific striker having scored 15 times prior to the semi-finals, despite having left the club in January. Sunderland were aiming to be promoted at their first attempt, having been relegated from the Premier League in the 2017–18 season, while Charlton had spent three seasons in the third tier of English football following their drop in the 2015–16 season. Sunderland had already played at Wembley during the season, losing on penalties to Portsmouth in the 2019 EFL Trophy Final; the play-off final was the club's 61st competitive fixture of the season. Pratley was selected for the Charlton starting eleven, in place of Albie Morgan who was not included in match-day squad. Igor Vetokele also missed out for Charlton with a long-term injury. Sunderland's starting line-up was the same as for their second semi-final leg against Portsmouth, although Aiden McGeady, who had scored 11 goals during the regular season, had recovered from a foot injury sustained in April to be named amongst the substitutes.

The final was refereed by Andrew Madley, with assistant referees Nick Hopton and Andrew Fox, and Peter Bankes acting as fourth official. It was the first time in the history of the play-offs that two teams would face each other in the final for a second time. Sunderland were considered as favourites to win the match by bookmakers. The match was broadcast live in the United Kingdom on Sky Sports Football and Sky Sports Main Event.

=== First half ===
Charlton kicked off the first half around 3 p.m. in front of a Wembley crowd of 76,155 in their regular red home kit, with Sunderland playing in their black away strip. In the third minute, Max Power was brought down by Charlton's Sarr and required treatment from the physiotherapist. Two minutes later, Phillips failed to control a backpass from Sarr, and the ball rolled into the Charlton net for an own goal, putting Sunderland 1–0 ahead. On nine minutes, Sunderland were forced to make their first substitution, bringing on Lewis Morgan for Power who had failed to recover from the earlier injury. Grant Leadbitter's 11th minute shot was tipped round the post by Phillips. Over the next fifteen minutes, the game evened out with Charlton beginning to exert some pressure: in the 24th minute a Taylor corner was headed wide by Patrick Bauer and three minutes later Taylor himself struck a shot over the Sunderland bar. With ten minutes of the first half remaining, Charlton scored the equaliser. Aribo's pass to Anfernee Dijksteel was flicked to Taylor whose cross was side-footed into the Sunderland goal from 3 yards (2.7 m) by Ben Purrington. A foul late on in the half by Sarr on George Honeyman earned the Charlton defender the first yellow card of the game. The resulting free kick was struck over the bar by Morgan, and with no further incident, the half ended 1–1.

=== Second half ===
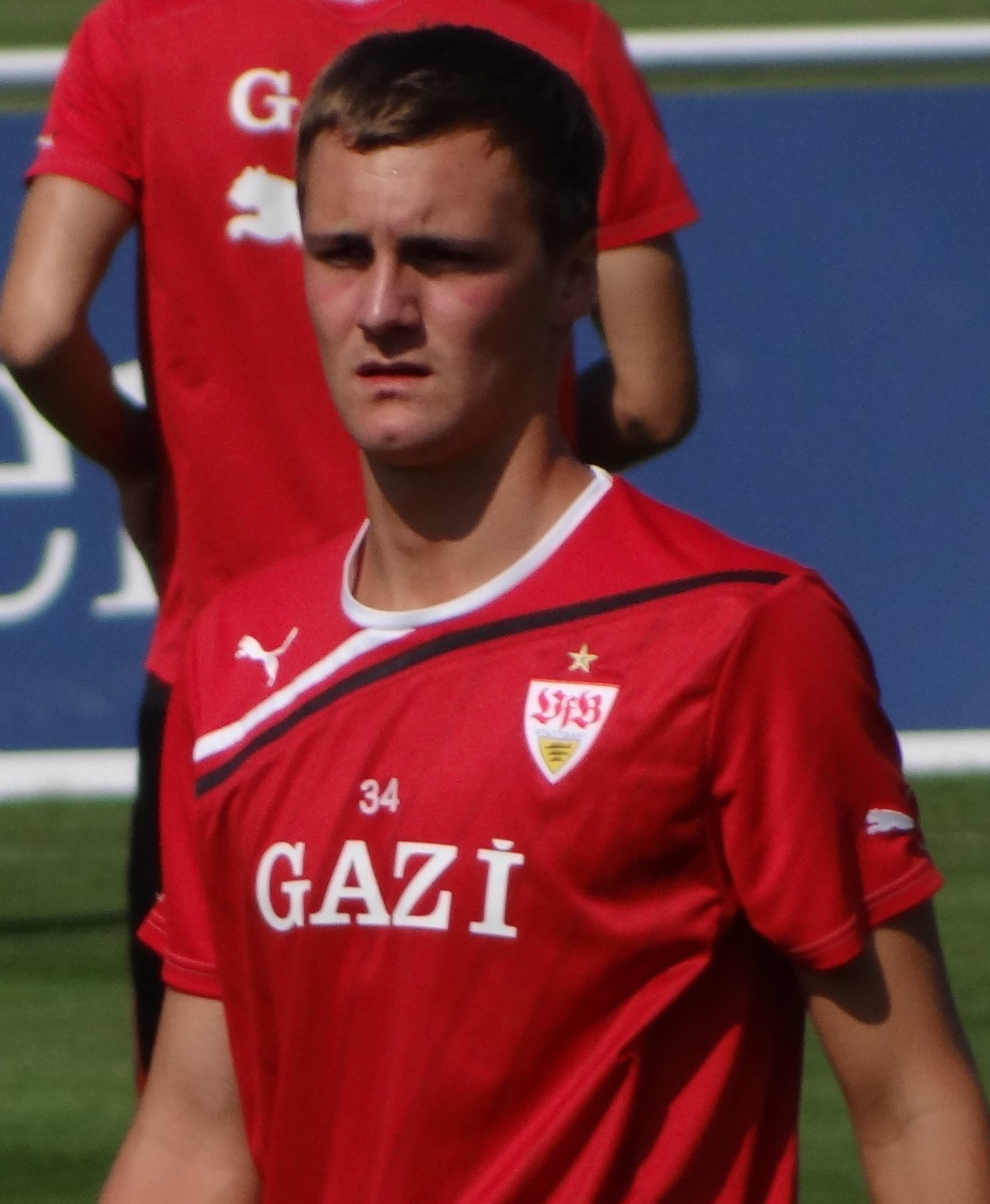
Patrick Bauer scored the winning goal deep into injury time.

Sarr was substituted during half time and replaced by Jason Pearce as Charlton switched to a diamond formation in midfield. They kicked off the second half with the first chance coming ten minutes in for Sunderland, as Maguire's cross was volleyed wide of the Charlton goal by Morgan. In the 57th minute, Sunderland made their second change of the afternoon, with Will Grigg coming on to replace Maguire. Two minutes later, Pratley and Luke O'Nien clashed heads, the latter needing to leave the pitch to address a bleeding head wound. In the 65th minute Grigg was booked for a foul on Purrington, and on 70 minutes, Pratley was replaced by Jonny Williams. A minute later McGeady came on for Charlie Wyke for Sunderland's final substitution of the afternoon. Soon after O'Nien was booked for a foul on Williams, before Bielik's header was cleared by Leadbitter. Grigg's cross with eight minutes to go was cleared by Bielik and a minute later, Leadbitter was shown a yellow card for a foul on Williams. McGeady's shot flew over Charlton's bar before O'Nien's cross was cleared at Sunderland's near post. Two minutes into injury time, Taylor was fouled by Tom Flanagan who received the fifth booking of the game. Josh Cullen's subsequent free kick was headed into the box by Bauer but the Sunderland goalkeeper Jon McLaughlin claimed the ball in a crowded area. In the final moments of added time, Cullen's deep cross from a quickly taken free kick was met by Bauer whose initial header was blocked by Flanagan, but the German defender was able to slide the ball into the Sunderland net from 4 yards (3.7 m) for a Charlton lead. The match ended 2–1 to Charlton and the London club were promoted to the EFL Championship.

=== Details ===
26 May 2019
15:00 BST

Charlton Athletic	2–1	Sunderland
Purrington 35'; Bauer 90+4'	Report	Sarr 5' (o.g.)

Wembley Stadium, London
Attendance: 76,155
Referee: Andrew Madley

Charlton Athletic	Sunderland

1	(England) Dillon Phillips
2	(Netherlands) Anfernee Dijksteel
4	(Poland) Krystian Bielik
5	(Germany) Patrick Bauer
23	(France) Naby Sarr	(yellow card) 44'	(substituted off) 45'
16	(England) Ben Purrington
15	(England) Darren Pratley		(substituted off) 71'
24	(Republic of Ireland) Josh Cullen
17	(Nigeria) Joe Aribo
9	(Montserrat) Lyle Taylor
10	(Antigua and Barbuda) Josh Parker
Substitutes:
22	(Wales) Chris Maxwell
6	(England) Jason Pearce		(substituted on) 45'
20	(England) Chris Solly
8	(England) Jake Forster-Caskey
12	(Northern Ireland) Ben Reeves
21	(Wales) Jonny Williams		(substituted on) 71'
32	(England) George Lapslie
Manager:
(England) Lee Bowyer

1	(Scotland) Jon McLaughlin
13	(England) Luke O'Nien	(yellow card) 73'
5	(Turkey) Alim Öztürk
12	(Northern Ireland) Tom Flanagan	(yellow card) 90+2'
3	(Costa Rica) Bryan Oviedo
6	(England) Lee Cattermole
27	(England) Max Power		(substituted off) 9'
23	(England) Grant Leadbitter	(yellow card) 83'
10	(England) George Honeyman
9	(England) Charlie Wyke		(substituted off) 72'
7	(Scotland) Chris Maguire		(substituted off) 57'
Substitutes:
32	(Poland) Max Stryjek
2	(Wales) Adam Matthews
30	(Republic of Ireland) Jimmy Dunne
11	(United States) Lynden Gooch
17	(Scotland) Lewis Morgan		(substituted on) 9'
19	(Republic of Ireland) Aiden McGeady		(substituted on) 72'
22	(Northern Ireland) Will Grigg	(yellow card) 65'	(substituted on) 57'
Manager:
(Scotland) Jack Ross

=== Statistics ===
Statistics
	Charlton	Sunderland
Goals scored	2	1
Shots on target	2	3
Shots off target	6	7
Fouls committed	14	20
Corner kicks	3	4
Yellow cards	1	4
Red cards	0	0

== Post-match ==
The winning goalscorer Bauer was elated: "I don't know what to say. It's amazing. We worked so hard all season – now we’ve done it, and it's unbelievable." His manager, Lee Bowyer, said: "The goal was one of those freak things that happens in the game, but it shows our character to come from behind. This is probably the proudest moment of my whole career." Jack Ross, the Sunderland manager, noted: "I came here to take the club back to the Championship at the first time of asking and I haven't been able to do that ... We have not fallen short by very much – but we have done."

Sunderland started their next season in the third tier of English football in League One for the second consecutive year. The league was temporarily suspended as a result of the COVID-19 pandemic with Sunderland in seventh position, equal on points with Peterborough who occupied the final play-off place, with eight games remaining to be played. Sunderland ended the season in the same position. Charlton's first season back in the EFL Championship was also interrupted by the pandemic with the club were in the relegation zone, in 22nd position, with nine games left. They ended the season in the same position, one point from safety, and were relegated back to League One.
