= 2016–17 Charlton Athletic F.C. season =

Charlton Athletic
2016–17 season
- Chairman: Richard Murray
- Manager: Russell Slade (until 14 November); Kevin Nugent (caretaker) (from 17 November 2016, until 27 November 2016); Karl Robinson (from 28 November)
- Stadium: The Valley
- League One: 13th
- FA Cup: Second round
- EFL Cup: First round
- EFL Trophy: Group stage
- Top goalscorer: League: Ricky Holmes (13); All: Ricky Holmes (13)
- Highest home attendance: 15,315 (vs. Millwall, 14 January 2017)
- Lowest home attendance: 1,186 (vs. Crawley Town, 4 October 2016)
- Average home league attendance: 11,162
Home colours	Away colours	Third colours

The 2016–17 season was Charlton Athletic's 95th season in their existence and first back in League One – since being champions in 2011–12 – following relegation from the championship the previous season. Along with competing in the League One, the club also participated in the FA Cup, League Cup and League Trophy. The season covered the period from 1 July 2016 to 30 June 2017.

== Kit ==
Sportswear giants Nike were Kit suppliers, with BETDAQ the front of shirt sponsor.

== Squad statistics ==
As of 30 April 2017

No.	Pos	Nat	Player	Total		League One		FA Cup		League Cup		EFL Trophy	
No.	Pos	Nat	Player	Apps	Goals	Apps	Goals	Apps	Goals	Apps	Goals	Apps	Goals
1	GK	(England) ENG	Declan Rudd (on loan from Norwich City)	40	0	38	0	1	0	1	0	0	0
2	DF	(Republic of Ireland) IRL	Kevin Foley (Note: Foley was born in Luton, England, but also qualified to represent the Republic of Ireland internationally through his parents and represented them at U-21 and B level before making his international debut for the Republic of Ireland in May 2009.)	20	0	12+3	0	2	0	1	0	2	0
2	DF	(England) ENG	Lewis Page	8	0	8	0	0	0	0	0	0	0
3	DF	(England) ENG	Adam Chicksen (Note: Chicksen was born in Milton Keynes, England, but also qualified to represent Zimbabwe internationally through his father and would make his international debut for Zimbabwe in March 2018.)	25	2	15+6	1	1	1	0	0	2+1	0
4	MF	(England) ENG	Johnnie Jackson	33	5	22+8	4	2	1	1	0	0	0
5	DF	(Germany) GER	Patrick Bauer	38	4	34+2	4	2	0	0	0	0	0
6	DF	(England) ENG	Roger Johnson	7	0	1+1	0	0+1	0	1	0	3	0
7	FW	(England) ENG	Ademola Lookman	25	7	15+6	5	2+1	2	1	0	0	0
7	FW	(Scotland) SCO	Tony Watt	16	2	9+7	2	0	0	0	0	0	0
8	MF	(Wales) WAL	Andrew Crofts (Note: Crofts was born in Chatham, England, but also qualified to represent Wales internationally through a grandparent and represented them at U-19 and U-21 level before making his international debut for Wales in October 2005.)	51	1	41+4	1	2	0	1	0	3	0
9	FW	(Northern Ireland) NIR	Josh Magennis	41	10	36+3	10	2	0	0	0	0	0
10	FW	(England) ENG	Nicky Ajose	28	7	17+4	6	2+1	0	1	0	3	1
11	MF	(England) ENG	Ricky Holmes	38	13	31+4	13	1	0	1	0	1	0
12	FW	(England) ENG	Stephy Mavididi (on loan from Arsenal)	5	0	3+2	0	0	0	0	0	0	0
13	GK	(England) ENG	Dillon Phillips	13	0	8	0	2	0	0	0	3	0
14	MF	(Democratic Republic of the Congo) COD	Jordan Botaka (on loan from Leeds United) (Note: Botaka was born in Kinshasa, Zaire (now Democratic Republic of the Congo), but also qualified to represent the Netherlands internationally and represented them at U-19 level before making his international debut for the DR Congo in March 2015.)	29	2	8+18	2	2+1	0	0	0	0	0
15	DF	(England) ENG	Ezri Konsa	39	0	30+2	0	3	0	1	0	3	0
16	DF	(England) ENG	Jason Pearce	24	1	23	1	1	0	0	0	0	0
17	DF	(England) ENG	Tareiq Holmes-Dennis	2	0	0+1	0	0	0	0+1	0	0	0
17	MF	(Norway) NOR	Fredrik Ulvestad (on loan from Burnley)	31	1	26+1	1	2	0	0	0	1+1	0
18	FW	(England) ENG	Karlan Ahearne-Grant	12	0	1+7	0	0	0	0+1	0	1+2	0
19	MF	(England) ENG	Jake Forster-Caskey	15	2	12+3	2	0	0	0	0	0	0
20	DF	(England) ENG	Chris Solly	28	0	27	0	0	0	0	0	1	0
21	DF	(Wales) WAL	Morgan Fox (Note: Fox was born in Chelmsford, England, but also qualified to represent Wales internationally and represented them at U-21 level.)	30	0	24	0	2+1	0	1	0	2	0
21	MF	(England) ENG	Nathan Byrne (on loan from Wigan Athletic)	17	1	16+1	1	0	0	0	0	0	0
22	MF	(France) FRA	El Hadji Ba	0	0	0	0	0	0	0	0	0	0
23	MF	(England) ENG	Ollie Muldoon	0	0	0	0	0	0	0	0	0	0
24	MF	(England) ENG	Regan Charles-Cook	1	0	0	0	0	0	0	0	0+1	0
25	MF	(Algeria) ALG	Ahmed Kashi (Note: Kashi was born in Aubervilliers, France, but also qualified to represent Algeria internationally and made his international debut for Algeria in January 2015.)	0	0	0	0	0	0	0	0	0	0
26	DF	(England) ENG	Harry Lennon	5	0	2	0	0	0	0	0	3	0
27	GK	(Bulgaria) BUL	Dimitar Mitov	0	0	0	0	0	0	0	0	0	0
28	FW	(England) ENG	Brandon Hanlan	15	0	0+9	0	1+1	0	1	0	2+1	0
29	DF	(England) ENG	Terell Thomas	0	0	0	0	0	0	0	0	0	0
30	FW	(England) ENG	Lee Novak	34	2	13+16	2	1+2	0	0	0	1+1	0
31	FW	(England) ENG	Josh Umerah	2	0	0+1	0	0	0	0	0	0+1	0
32	MF	(England) ENG	Joe Aribo	22	0	13+6	0	1	0	0	0	1+1	0
33	DF	(England) ENG	Aaron Barnes	1	0	0+1	0	0	0	0	0	0	0
34	MF	(Netherlands) NED	Anfernee Dijksteel	0	0	0	0	0	0	0	0	0	0
35	MF	(England) ENG	George Lapslie	0	0	0	0	0	0	0	0	0	0
36	DF	(England) ENG	Jay Dasilva (on loan from Chelsea)	10	0	6+4	0	0	0	0	0	0	0
42	GK	(England) ENG	Jordan Beeney	0	0	0	0	0	0	0	0	0	0
50	DF	(Portugal) POR	Jorge Teixeira	23	4	15+5	4	1+1	0	0	0	1	0

=== Top scorers ===
As of 30 April 2017

Place	Position	Nation	Number	Name	League One	FA Cup	League Cup	EFL Trophy	Total
1	MF	(England)	11	Ricky Holmes	13	0	0	0	13
2	FW	(Northern Ireland)	9	Josh Magennis	10	0	0	0	10
3	FW	(England)	10	Nicky Ajose	6	0	0	1	7
=	FW	(England)	7	Ademola Lookman	5	2	0	0	7
5	MF	(England)	4	Johnnie Jackson	4	1	0	0	5
6	MF	(Portugal)	50	Jorge Teixeira	4	0	0	0	4
=	DF	(Germany)	5	Patrick Bauer	4	0	0	0	4
8	FW	(England)	30	Lee Novak	2	0	0	0	2
=	MF	(Democratic Republic of the Congo)	14	Jordan Botaka	2	0	0	0	2
=	MF	(Scotland)	7	Tony Watt	2	0	0	0	2
=	MF	(England)	19	Jake Forster-Caskey	2	0	0	0	2
=	MF	(England)	3	Adam Chicksen	1	1	0	0	2
13	MF	(Norway)	17	Fredrik Ulvestad	1	0	0	0	1
=	MF	(England)	21	Nathan Byrne	1	0	0	0	1
=	MF	(Wales)	8	Andrew Crofts	1	0	0	0	1
=	DF	(England)	16	Jason Pearce	1	0	0	0	1
=	Own goals				1	0	0	0	1
Totals					60	4	0	1	65

=== Disciplinary record ===
As of 30 April 2017

Number	Nation	Position	Name	League One		FA Cup		League Cup		EFL Trophy		Total	
Number	Nation	Position	Name	Booked	Sent off (straight red)	Booked	Sent off (straight red)	Booked	Sent off (straight red)	Booked	Sent off (straight red)	Booked	Sent off (straight red)
11	(England)	MF	Ricky Holmes	8	0	0	0	0	0	0	0	8	0
7	(Scotland)	FW	Tony Watt	7	0	0	0	0	0	0	0	7	0
15	(England)	DF	Ezri Konsa	6	0	1	0	0	0	1	0	8	0
5	(Germany)	DF	Patrick Bauer	6	1	1	0	0	0	0	0	7	1
21	(Wales)	DF	Morgan Fox	5	0	0	0	1	0	0	0	6	0
21	(England)	MF	Nathan Byrne	5	1	0	0	0	0	0	0	5	1
3	(England)	MF	Adam Chicksen	5	0	0	0	0	0	0	0	5	0
9	(Northern Ireland)	FW	Josh Magennis	5	0	0	0	0	0	0	0	5	0
20	(England)	DF	Chris Solly	4	1	0	0	0	0	0	0	4	1
19	(England)	MF	Jake Forster-Caskey	4	0	0	0	0	0	0	0	4	0
4	(England)	MF	Johnnie Jackson	3	0	0	0	1	0	0	0	4	0
7	(England)	FW	Ademola Lookman	3	0	0	0	0	0	0	0	3	0
16	(England)	DF	Jason Pearce	2	0	1	0	0	0	0	0	3	0
8	(Wales)	MF	Andrew Crofts	2	0	0	0	1	0	0	0	3	0
50	(Portugal)	DF	Jorge Teixeira	2	1	0	0	0	0	0	0	2	1
17	(Norway)	MF	Fredrik Ulvestad	2	0	0	0	0	0	0	0	2	0
32	(England)	MF	Joe Aribo	2	0	0	0	0	0	0	0	2	0
30	(England)	FW	Lee Novak	1	0	0	0	0	0	0	0	1	0
13	(England)	GK	Dillon Phillips	1	0	0	0	0	0	0	0	1	0
31	(England)	FW	Josh Umerah	1	0	0	0	0	0	0	0	1	0
26	(England)	DF	Harry Lennon	0	1	0	0	0	0	0	0	0	1
2	(England)	DF	Lewis Page	0	1	0	0	0	0	0	0	0	1
2	(Republic of Ireland)	DF	Kevin Foley	0	0	1	0	0	0	0	0	1	0
Totals				74	6	4	0	3	0	1	0	82	6

== Transfers ==
=== In ===
Date from	Position	Nationality	Name	From	Fee	Ref.
1 July 2016	CF	(England)	Nicky Ajose	Swindon Town	Undisclosed	
1 July 2016	LW	(England)	Ricky Holmes	Northampton Town	Undisclosed	
1 July 2016	CF	(England)	Lee Novak	Birmingham City	Free transfer	
1 July 2016	RW	(England)	Louis-Michel Yamfam	Stevenage	Undisclosed	
22 July 2016	CM	(Wales)	Andrew Crofts	Brighton & Hove Albion	Free transfer	
4 August 2016	CB	(England)	Jason Pearce	Wigan Athletic	Undisclosed	
5 August 2016	FB	(Republic of Ireland)	Kevin Foley	Ipswich Town	Free transfer	
11 August 2016	CF	(Northern Ireland)	Josh Magennis	Kilmarnock	Undisclosed	
19 August 2016	CM	(England)	Matt Carter	West Ham United	Undisclosed	
30 August 2016	FB	(England)	Adam Chicksen	Brighton & Hove Albion	Free transfer	
5 January 2017	CM	(England)	Jake Forster-Caskey	Brighton & Hove Albion	Undisclosed	
6 January 2017	LB	(England)	Lewis Page	West Ham United	Undisclosed	

=== Out ===
Date from	Position	Nationality	Name	To	Fee	Ref.
1 July 2016	CF	(Ghana) (Note: Ansah was born in Bexley, England, and represented them at U-16 and U-17 level, but also qualified to represent Ghana internationally and has confirmed his international allegiance to them.)	Zak Ansah	Woking (Note: Following Ansah's release, he signed for Woking.)	Released	
1 July 2016	CF	(Iran)	Reza Ghoochannejhad	Heerenveen (Note: Following Ghoochannejhad's release, he signed for SC Heerenveen.)	Released	
1 July 2016	CM	(England)	Alex Kelly	Free agent	Released	
1 July 2016	RB	(Italy)	Marco Motta	Free agent	Released	
1 July 2016	CB	(England)	Ayo Obileye	Eastleigh (Note: Following Obileye's release, he signed for Eastleigh.)	Released	
1 July 2016	CF	(England)	Joe Pigott	Cambridge United (Note: Following Pigott's release, he signed for Cambridge United.)	Released	
1 July 2016	CB	(England)	Josh Staunton	Dagenham & Redbridge (Note: Following Staunton's release, he signed for Dagenham & Redbridge.)	Released	
1 July 2016	CF	(Romania)	George Țucudean	CS Pandurii Târgu Jiu (Note: Following Țucudean's release, he signed for CS Pandurii Târgu Jiu.)	Released	
7 July 2016	GK	(Serbia)	Marko Dmitrović	Alcorcón	Free transfer	
13 July 2016	CM	(England)	Jordan Cousins	Queens Park Rangers	Undisclosed	
19 July 2016	RM	(Iceland)	Jóhann Berg Guðmundsson	Burnley	Undisclosed	
19 July 2016	GK	(England)	Nick Pope	Burnley	Undisclosed	
22 July 2016	GK	(Republic of Ireland)	Stephen Henderson	Nottingham Forest	Free transfer	
5 August 2016	LM	(England) (Note: Harriott was born in Croydon, England, and represented them at U-19 level, but also qualified to represent Guyana and Jamaica internationally and would make his international debut for Guyana in March 2019.)	Callum Harriott	Reading	Undisclosed	
5 August 2016	AM	(England)	Tobi Sho-Silva	Bromley	Free transfer	
18 August 2016	DL	(Morocco) (Note: Bergdich was born in Compiègne, France, but also qualified to represent Morocco internationally and represented them at U-23 level before making his international debut for Morocco in 2012.)	Zakarya Bergdich	Córdoba CF (Note: Following Bergdich's release, he signed for Córdoba.)	Released	
24 August 2016	DL	(England)	Tareiq Holmes-Dennis	Huddersfield Town	Undisclosed	
1 September 2016	CM	(France)	Alou Diarra	AS Nancy (Note: Following Diarra's release, he signed for Nancy.)	Released	
5 January 2017	FW	(England)	Ademola Lookman	Everton	£11,000,000	
5 January 2017	FB	(Republic of Ireland)	Kevin Foley	Coventry City (Note: Following Foley's release, he signed for Coventry City.)	Released	
6 January 2017	LB	(Wales)	Morgan Fox	Sheffield Wednesday	Undisclosed	
1 February 2017	CM	(England)	Ollie Muldoon	Gillingham (Note: Following Muldoon's release, he signed for Gillingham.)	Released	
1 February 2017	CM	(France)	El Hadji Ba	Stabæk (Note: Following Ba's release, he signed for Stabæk.)	Released	
15 February 2017	CM	(England)	Samuel Bone	Shamrock Rovers	Free transfer	

=== Loans in ===
Date from	Position	Nationality	Name	From	Date until	Ref.
2 August 2016	GK	(England)	Declan Rudd	Norwich City	End of Season	
11 August 2016	RW	(Democratic Republic of the Congo)	Jordan Botaka	Leeds United	End of Season	
31 August 2016	CM	(Norway)	Fredrik Ulvestad	Burnley	End of Season	
1 January 2017	LB	(England)	Jay Dasilva	Chelsea	End of Season	
9 January 2017	RW	(England)	Nathan Byrne	Wigan Athletic	End of Season	
31 January 2017	CF	(England)	Stephy Mavididi	Arsenal	1 March 2017	

=== Loans out ===
Date from	Position	Nationality	Name	To	Date until	Ref.
1 July 2016	CF	(Angola) (Note: Vetokele was born in Ostend, Belgium, and represented them at U-17, U-18, U-19, and U-21 level, but also qualified to represent Angola internationally and made his international debut for Angola in 2014.)	Igor Vetokele	Zulte-Waregem	7 January 2017	
1 July 2016	CB	(France)	Naby Sarr	Red Star	30 June 2017	
20 July 2016	CF	(Scotland)	Tony Watt	Heart of Midlothian	1 January 2017	
1 August 2016	LW	(Spain)	Cristian Ceballos	Sint-Truiden	30 June 2017	
20 September 2016	GK	(England)	Callum Thomas	Grays Athletic	Open ended	
30 September 2016	CM	(England)	Ollie Muldoon	Braintree Town	26 November 2016	
20 October 2016	CB	(England)	Terell Thomas	Woking	30 June 2017	
3 November 2016	GK	(England)	Jordan Beeney	Greenwich Borough	25 November 2016 (Note: On 25 November 2015, Jordan Beeney was recalled from his loan spell at Greenwich Borough.)	
20 December 2016	MF	(England)	Chris Millar	Dulwich Hamlet	14 January 2017	
20 December 2016	FW	(England)	Louis-Michel Yamfam	Dulwich Hamlet	14 January 2017	
7 January 2017	CF	(Angola)	Igor Vetokele	Sint-Truidense	30 June 2017	
20 January 2017	CF	(England)	Brandon Hanlan	Bromley	11 March 2017	
31 January 2017	CF	(England)	Nicky Ajose	Swindon Town	30 June 2017	
31 January 2017	CF	(England)	Josh Umerah	Kilmarnock	30 June 2017	
3 February 2017	CM	(England)	Regan Charles-Cook	Solihull Moors	29 April 2017	
15 February 2017	CF	(Northern Ireland)	Mikhail Kennedy	Derry City	30 June 2017	
30 March 2017	GK	(England)	Jordan Beeney	East Grinstead Town	30 April 2017	

== Competitions ==
=== Pre-season friendlies ===
9 July 2016 Friendly	Welling United	1–4	Charlton Athletic	Welling
15:00 BST	Sprague 52' (pen.)	Report	Ba 3'; Ajose 55', 68', 77'	Stadium: Park View Road; Referee: Ian Fissenden

12 July 2016 Friendly	Bromley	2–1	Charlton Athletic	Bromley
19:45 BST	Porter 14'; Turgott 26'	Report	Hanlan 68'	Stadium: Hayes Lane; Referee: David Rock

16 July 2016 Friendly	FC Anzhi Makhachkala	1–0	Charlton Athletic	Pinkafeld
18:00 UTC+1	Tigiev 90'	Report		Stadium: Adeg-Meisterfrost Arena

19 July 2016 Friendly	Maccabi Petah Tikva	0–1	Charlton Athletic	Sonnhofen
18:00 UTC+1		Report	Hanlan 62'	Stadium: Hans Krogger Stadium

19 July 2016 Friendly	Dulwich Hamlet	1–2	Charlton Athletic XI	East Dulwich
19:45 BST	Drage 78'	Report	Ahearne-Grant 42'; Kennedy 62'	Stadium: Champion Hill

23 July 2016 Friendly	Leyton Orient	0–0	Charlton Athletic	Leyton
15:00 BST		Report		Stadium: Brisbane Road; Attendance: 1,423; Referee: D. Deadman

26 July 2016 Friendly	Charlton Athletic	0–0	Ipswich Town	Charlton
19:45 BST		Report		Stadium: The Valley; Attendance: 2,308; Referee: D. Deadman

30 July 2016 Friendly	Charlton Athletic	1–1	RKC Waalwijk	Charlton
15:00 BST	Crofts 69'	Report	Langedijk 25'	Stadium: The Valley; Attendance: 1,626 (217 from Waalwijk); Referee: James Linington

=== League One ===
==== League table ====
Pos	Team	Pld	W	D	L	GF	GA	GD	Pts
11	Peterborough United	46	17	11	18	62	62	0	62
12	Milton Keynes Dons	46	16	13	17	60	58	+2	61
13	Charlton Athletic	46	14	18	14	60	53	+7	60
14	Walsall	46	14	16	16	51	58	−7	58
15	AFC Wimbledon	46	13	18	15	52	55	−3	57

Source: BBC Sport
Rules for classification: 1) Points; 2) Goal difference; 3) Number of goals scored

==== Results summary ====
Overall								Home						Away					
Pld	W	D	L	GF	GA	GD	Pts	W	D	L	GF	GA	GD	W	D	L	GF	GA	GD
46	14	18	14	60	53	+7	60	9	8	6	31	19	+12	5	10	8	29	34	−5

Last updated: 30 April 2017.

==== Results by round ====
Round	1	2	3	4	5	6	7	8	9	10	11	12	13	14	15	16	17	18	19	20	21	22	23	24	25	26	27	28	29	30	31	32	33	34	35	36	37	38	39	40	41	42	43	44	45	46
Ground	A	H	H	A	H	A	H	A	A	H	H	H	A	A	H	A	H	A	H	A	H	A	A	A	H	H	A	H	A	A	A	H	H	A	A	H	H	H	A	A	H	H	A	H	A	H
Result	L	D	W	W	D	D	L	D	D	D	L	W	D	D	W	L	W	W	D	D	L	L	W	D	W	D	W	D	D	L	D	L	L	L	L	W	D	D	L	L	L	W	D	W	W	W
Position	23	20	9	5	9	13	14	14	16	12	18	15	15	17	14	15	14	11	11	11	13	14	12	12	11	11	11	12	13	13	13	13	14	15	16	14	14	15	16	16	16	16	15	15	14	13

Updated to match(es) played on 30 April 2017. Source:
A = Away; H = Home; W = Win; D = Draw; L = Loss

==== Matches ====
6 August 2016 1	Bury	2–0	Charlton Athletic	Bury
15:00 BST	Danns 71' (pen.); Etuhu 87'	Report		Stadium: Gigg Lane; Attendance: 4,037; Referee: Nigel Miller

13 August 2016 2	Charlton Athletic	1–1	Northampton Town	Charlton
15:00 BST	Jackson 57'	Report	Revell 16'	Stadium: The Valley; Attendance: 11,567; Referee: Darren England

16 August 2016 3	Charlton Athletic	3–0	Shrewsbury Town	Charlton
19:45 BST	Holmes 22', 31'; Jackson 24'	Report		Stadium: The Valley; Attendance: 9,174; Referee: Gavin Ward

20 August 2016 4	Walsall	1–2	Charlton Athletic	Walsall
15:00 BST	Morris 72'	Report	Ajose 42', 74'	Stadium: Bescot Stadium; Attendance: 4,586; Referee: Chris Sarginson

27 August 2016 5	Charlton Athletic	1–1	Bolton Wanderers	Charlton
15:00 BST	Lookman 90'	Report	Madine 53'	Stadium: The Valley; Attendance: 10,926; Referee: Dean Whitestone

10 September 2016 6	Fleetwood Town	2–2	Charlton Athletic	Fleetwood
15:00 BST	Long 5'; Ball 44'	Report	Magennis 32'; Novak 87'	Stadium: Highbury Stadium; Attendance: 3,371; Referee: Darren Handley

17 September 2016 7	Charlton Athletic	1–2	AFC Wimbledon	Charlton
15:00 BST	Lookman 8'	Report	Poleon 78'; Barnett 85'	Stadium: The Valley; Attendance: 11,927; Referee: Oliver Langford

20 September 2016 8	Scunthorpe United	0–0	Charlton Athletic	Scunthorpe
19:45 BST		Report		Stadium: Glanford Park; Attendance: 3,801; Referee: Chris Sarginson

24 September 2016 9	Oxford United	1–1	Charlton Athletic	Oxford
15:00 BST	Maguire 67'	Report	Jackson 54' (pen.)	Stadium: Kassam Stadium; Attendance: 8,847; Referee: Keith Stroud

27 September 2016 10	Charlton Athletic	1–1	Oldham Athletic	Charlton
19:45 BST	Magennis 22'	Report	Clarke 83'	Stadium: The Valley; Attendance: 8,745; Referee: Nick Kinseley

1 October 2016 11	Charlton Athletic	0–1	Rochdale	Charlton
15:00 BST		Report	Andrew 25'	Stadium: The Valley; Attendance: 14,460; Referee: Robert Jones

15 October 2016 12	Charlton Athletic	3–0	Coventry City	Charlton
15:00 BST	Holmes 32'; Lookman 78'; Magennis 88'	Report		Stadium: The Valley; Attendance: 11,406; Referee: Darren Deadman

18 October 2016 13	Port Vale	1–1	Charlton Athletic	Burslem
19:45 BST	Jones 85' (pen.)	Report	Ulvestad 30'	Stadium: Vale Park; Attendance: 3,494; Referee: Graham Salisbury

22 October 2016 14	Gillingham	1–1	Charlton Athletic	Gillingham
15:00 BST	Dack 41'	Report	Ajose 90+1' (pen.)	Stadium: Priestfield Stadium; Attendance: 8,670; Referee: Mark Haywood

29 October 2016 15	Charlton Athletic	1–0	Chesterfield	Charlton
15:00 BST	Novak 86'	Report		Stadium: The Valley; Attendance: 10,153; Referee: John Busby

12 November 2016 16	Swindon Town	3–0	Charlton Athletic	Swindon
12:00 GMT	Fox 43' (o.g.); Jones 50'; Goddard 86'	Report		Stadium: County Ground; Attendance: 6,599; Referee: Tim Robinson

19 November 2016 17	Charlton Athletic	2–0	Port Vale	Charlton
15:00 GMT	Magennis 30'; Ajose 44'	Report		Stadium: The Valley; Attendance: 8,992; Referee: Richard Clark

22 November 2016 18	Bristol Rovers	1–5	Charlton Athletic	Bristol
19:45 GMT	Taylor 90+3' (pen.)	Report	Lookman 26'; Magennis 44'; Bauer 50'; Chicksen 77'; Ajose 84'	Stadium: The Memorial Stadium; Attendance: 8,089; Referee: Simon Hooper

26 November 2016 19	Charlton Athletic	1–1	Sheffield United	Charlton
15:00 GMT	Bauer 90+3'	Report	Duffy 32'	Stadium: The Valley; Attendance: 12,580; Referee: Graham Scott

10 December 2016 20	Bradford City	0–0	Charlton Athletic	Bradford
15:00 GMT		Report		Stadium: Valley Parade; Attendance: 17,968; Referee: Mark Haywood

17 December 2016 21	Charlton Athletic	0–2	Peterborough United	Charlton
15:00 GMT		Report	Tafazolli 21'; Edwards 66'	Stadium: The Valley; Attendance: 10,193; Referee: Charles Breakspear

21 December 2016 22	Millwall	3–1	Charlton Athletic	Bermondsey
19:45 GMT	O'Brien 40'; Morison 42', 60'	Report	Ajose 49'	Stadium: The Den; Attendance: 14,395; Referee: Christopher Kavanagh

26 December 2016 23	Milton Keynes Dons	0–1	Charlton Athletic	Milton Keynes
15:00 GMT		Report	Lookman 38'	Stadium: Stadium mk Attendance: 10,257; Referee: Chris Sarginson

31 December 2016 24	Southend United	1–1	Charlton Athletic	Southend-on-Sea
13:00 GMT	Cox 24'	Report	Crofts 89'	Stadium: Roots Hall Stadium; Attendance: 10,329; Referee: Mark Heywood

2 January 2017 25	Charlton Athletic	4–1	Bristol Rovers	Charlton
15:00 GMT	Magennis 41', 50', 73'; Teixeira 61'	Report	Easter 12'	Stadium: The Valley; Attendance: Darren Deadman; Referee: 12,252

14 January 2017 26	Charlton Athletic	0–0	Millwall	Charlton
15:00 GMT		Report		Stadium: The Valley; Attendance: 15,315; Referee: Keith Stroud

28 January 2017 27	Bolton Wanderers	1–2	Charlton Athletic	Bolton
15:00 GMT	Clough 13'	Report	Bauer 23'; Byrne 45+2'	Stadium: Macron Stadium; Attendance: 13,265; Referee: Robert Jones

4 February 2017 28	Charlton Athletic	1–1	Fleetwood Town	Charlton
15:00 GMT	Holmes 37'	Report	Bell 90+4'	Stadium: The Valley; Attendance: 9,916; Referee: Tim Robinson

11 February 2017 29	AFC Wimbledon	1–1	Charlton Athletic	Kingston upon Thames
15:00 GMT	Elliott 90+2'	Report	Holmes 8'	Stadium: Kingsmeadow; Attendance: 4,595; Referee: Carl Boyeson

14 February 2017 30	Oldham Athletic	1–0	Charlton Athletic	Oldham
19:45 GMT	Banks 4'	Report		Stadium: Boundary Park; Attendance: 2,946; Referee: Mark Brown

18 February 2017 31	Rochdale	3–3	Charlton Athletic	Rochdale
15:00 GMT	Canavan 4'; Andrew 70'; Mendez-Laing 84'	Report	Botaka 41'; Teixeira 61', 88'	Stadium: Spotland Stadium; Attendance: 2,842; Referee: Scott Duncan

21 February 2017 32	Charlton Athletic	0–1	Oxford United	Charlton
19:45 GMT		Report	McAleny 12'	Stadium: The Valley; Attendance: 9,109; Referee: Gavin Ward

25 February 2017 33	Charlton Athletic	0–1	Bury	Charlton
15:00 GMT		Report	Lowe 21'	Stadium: The Valley; Attendance: 14,640; Referee: Trevor Kettle

28 February 2017 34	Shrewsbury Town	4–3	Charlton Athletic	Shrewsbury
19:45 GMT	Dodds 11', 75'; Roberts 51'; Whalley 52'	Report	Holmes 24', 44', 70'	Stadium: New Meadow; Attendance: 4,913; Referee: Michael Salisbury

4 March 2017 35	Northampton Town	2–1	Charlton Athletic	Northampton
15:00 GMT	Smith 32'; O'Toole 62'	Report	Botaka 36'	Stadium: Sixfields Stadium; Attendance: 7,118; Referee: Ben Toner

7 March 2017 36	Charlton Athletic	2–1	Scunthorpe United	Charlton
20:00 GMT	Jackson 33'; Watt 90'	Report	van Veen 75'	Stadium: The Valley; Attendance: 9,088; Referee: Dean Whitestone

11 March 2017 37	Charlton Athletic	1–1	Walsall	Charlton
15:00 GMT	Watt 61'	Report	Jackson 44'	Stadium: The Valley; Attendance: 9,900; Referee: Nick Kinseley

14 March 2017 38	Charlton Athletic	1–1	Bradford City	Charlton
19:45 GMT	Teixeira 35'	Report	Dieng 42'	Stadium: The Valley; Attendance: 9,326; Referee: James Linington

18 March 2017 39	Sheffield United	2–1	Charlton Athletic	Sheffield
15:00 GMT	O'Connell 14'; Lafferty 48'	Report	Holmes 3'	Stadium: Bramall Lane; Attendance: 23,308; Referee: Scott Duncan

1 April 2017 40	Peterborough United	2–0	Charlton Athletic	Peterborough
15:00 BST	Samuelsen 74'; Maddison 83'	Report		Stadium: London Road; Attendance: 5,482; Referee: Graham Salisbury

4 April 2017 41	Charlton Athletic	0–2	Milton Keynes Dons	Charlton
19:45 GMT		Report	O'Keefe 7'; Barnes 57'	Stadium: The Valley; Attendance: 10,943; Referee: Andy Haines

8 April 2017 42	Charlton Athletic	2–1	Southend United	Charlton
15:00 GMT	Holmes 6'; Thompson 74' (o.g.)	Report	White 11'	Stadium: The Valley; Attendance: 11,730; Referee: Roger East

14 April 2017 43	Coventry City	1–1	Charlton Athletic	Coventry
15:00	Thomas 28'	Report	Bauer 54'	Stadium: Ricoh Arena; Attendance: 9,479; Referee: Darren Handley

17 April 2017 44	Charlton Athletic	3–0	Gillingham	Charlton
15:00 GMT	Pearce 20'; Holmes 31'; Magennis 54'	Report		Stadium: The Valley; Attendance: 12,449; Referee: Brett Huxtable

22 April 2017 45	Chesterfield	1–2	Charlton Athletic	Chesterfield
15:00 GMT	Mitchell 90+1'	Report	Forster-Caskey 37'; Holmes 57'	Stadium: Proact Stadium; Attendance: 5,657; Referee: Michael Salisbury

30 April 2017 46	Charlton Athletic	3–0	Swindon Town	Charlton
12:00 GMT	Magennis 14'; Forster-Caskey 43'; Holmes 66'	Report		Stadium: The Valley; Attendance: 11,932; Referee: John Brooks

=== FA Cup ===
5 November 2016 First round	Charlton Athletic	3–1	Scunthorpe United	Charlton
15:00 GMT	Lookman 34', 83'; Jackson 40'	Report	Hopper 52'	Stadium: The Valley; Attendance: 4,123; Referee: Chris Sarginson

3 December 2016 Second round	Charlton Athletic	0–0	Milton Keynes Dons	Charlton
15:00 GMT		Report		Stadium: The Valley; Attendance: 4,982; Referee: Darren England

13 December 2016 Second round replay	Milton Keynes Dons	3–1 (a.e.t.)	Charlton Athletic	Milton Keynes
19:45 GMT	Powell 6'; Reeves 94'; Bowditch 97'	Report	Chicksen 24'	Stadium: Stadium mk Attendance: 3,655; Referee: Rob Jones

=== League Cup ===
9 August 2016 First round	Cheltenham Town	1–0	Charlton Athletic	Cheltenham
19:45 BST	Pell 17'	Report		Stadium: The World of Smile Stadium; Attendance: 2,106; Referee: Brendan Malone

=== EFL Trophy ===
Pos	Div	Team	Pld	W	PW	PL	L	GF	GA	GD	Pts	Qualification
1	ACA	Southampton U21	3	2	0	1	0	6	1	+5	7	Advance to Round 2
2	L2	Crawley Town	3	2	0	0	1	3	4	−1	6	Advance to Round 2
3	L1	Charlton Athletic	3	0	1	1	1	1	3	−2	3	
4	L2	Colchester United	3	0	1	0	2	2	4	−2	2	

Source: Sky Sports

30 August 2016 Group stage 1	Charlton Athletic	0–0 (5–4 p)	Southampton U21	Charlton
19:45 BST		Report		Stadium: The Valley; Attendance: 1,336; Referee: A. Haines

4 October 2016 Group stage 2	Charlton Athletic	0–2	Crawley Town	Charlton
19:45 BST		Report	Yussuf 44'; Collins 50'	Stadium: The Valley; Attendance: 1,186; Referee: James Linington

8 November 2016 Group stage 3	Colchester United	1–1 (4–3 p)	Charlton Athletic	Colchester
19:45 GMT	Bonne 42'	Report	Ajose 32'	Stadium: Weston Homes Community Stadium; Attendance: 548; Referee: John Brooks
	Penalties
	Guthrie (penalty scored); Bonne (penalty scored); Dunne (penalty missed); Wright (penalty scored); Slater (penalty scored)		Hanlan (penalty scored); Ulvestad (penalty scored); Ahearne-Grant (penalty missed); Teixeira (penalty scored); Konsa (penalty missed)

=== Kent Senior Cup ===
2 November 2016 Second round	Phoenix Sports	1–4	Charlton Athletic	Barnehurst
19:45 BST	Pattisson 22'	Report	Ahearne-Grant 15', 31'; Umerah 63'; Hackett-Fairchild 85'	Stadium: Phoenix Sports Ground; Attendance: 347; Referee: Daniel Bonneywell

14 December 2016 Quarter-final	Margate	1–2	Charlton Athletic	Margate
19:45 BST	Adeboyejo 38'	Report	Kennedy 82'; Ahearne-Grant 86'	Stadium: Hartsdown Park; Attendance: 312; Referee: S Finnigan

28 March 2017 Semi-final	Welling United	1–1 (2–0 p)	Charlton Athletic	Welling
19:45 BST	Cathline 75'	Report	Millar 45'	Stadium: Park View Road; Attendance: 337; Referee: Daniel Bonneywell
	Penalties
	Hatton (penalty scored); Walker (penalty scored); Fish (penalty missed)		Lapslie (penalty missed); Hanlan (penalty missed); Millar (penalty missed); Yamfam (penalty missed)
