= 2019–20 Charlton Athletic F.C. season =

Charlton Athletic
2019–20 season
- Chairman: Richard Murray (until 29 November); Matt Southall (from 29 November until 20 March)
- Manager: Lee Bowyer
- Stadium: The Valley
- Championship: 22nd (relegated)
- FA Cup: Third round (vs. West Bromwich Albion)
- EFL Cup: First round (vs. Forest Green Rovers)
- Top goalscorer: League: Lyle Taylor, Macauley Bonne (11); All: Lyle Taylor, Macauley Bonne (11)
- Highest home attendance: 25,363 (vs. Blackburn Rovers, 15 February 2020)
- Lowest home attendance: 2,693 (vs. Forest Green Rovers, 13 August 2019) (Note: Excludes matches held behind closed doors.)
- Average home league attendance: 18,017 (as of 7 March 2020)
Home colours	Away colours	Third colours

Founded in 1905, the 2019–20 season was Charlton Athletic's 114th season in their existence. Along with competing in the Championship, the club also participated in the FA Cup and EFL Cup. The season covered the period from 1 July 2019 to 31 July 2020.

Due to the COVID-19 pandemic in the United Kingdom, the Championship season was stopped after game 37 until further notice. However, on 31 May 2020, the EFL agreed to a provisional restart date of the weekend of 20 June 2020 for the 2019/20 Championship season.

== Kit ==
Sportswear manufacturers Hummel were Kit suppliers, with BETDAQ donating front of shirt sponsorship to charity Children with Cancer UK.

== Squad statistics ==
As of 22 July 2020

No.	Pos	Nat	Player	Total		Championship		FA Cup		League Cup	
No.	Pos	Nat	Player	Apps	Goals	Apps	Goals	Apps	Goals	Apps	Goals
1	GK	(England) ENG	Dillon Phillips	47	0	46+0	0	1+0	0	0+0	0
2	DF	(Netherlands) NED	Anfernee Dijksteel	1	0	1+0	0	0+0	0	0+0	0
2	DF	(Wales) WAL	Adam Matthews	29	0	28+1	0	0+0	0	0+0	0
3	DF	(England) ENG	Ben Purrington	31	2	24+7	2	0+0	0	0+0	0
4	DF	(England) ENG	Deji Oshilaja	27	0	19+6	0	1+0	0	1+0	0
5	DF	(Wales) WAL	Tom Lockyer	43	1	43+0	1	0+0	0	0+0	0
6	DF	(England) ENG	Jason Pearce	39	1	35+4	1	0+0	0	0+0	0
7	MF	(Wales) WAL	Jonny Williams	27	0	15+11	0	0+1	0	0+0	0
8	MF	(England) ENG	Jake Forster-Caskey	12	0	7+4	0	0+0	0	1+0	0
9	FW	(Montserrat) MSR	Lyle Taylor	22	11	17+5	11	0+0	0	0+0	0
10	FW	(England) ENG	Chuks Aneke	21	1	2+18	1	0+0	0	1+0	0
11	MF	(England) ENG	Conor Gallagher (on loan from Chelsea)	26	6	25+1	6	0+0	0	0+0	0
12	DF	(England) ENG	Lewis Page	0	0	0+0	0	0+0	0	0+0	0
13	GK	(England) ENG	Ben Amos	1	0	0+0	0	0+0	0	1+0	0
14	MF	(England) ENG	Jonathan Leko (on loan from West Bromwich Albion)	21	5	19+2	5	0+0	0	0+0	0
14	MF	(Republic of Ireland) IRL	Aiden McGeady (on loan from Sunderland)	10	0	8+2	0	0+0	0	0+0	0
15	MF	(England) ENG	Darren Pratley	36	2	30+6	2	0+0	0	0+0	0
16	MF	(Wales) WAL	Joe Ledley	1	0	1+0	0	0+0	0	0+0	0
17	FW	(Zimbabwe) ZIM	Macauley Bonne	34	11	26+7	11	0+0	0	1+0	0
18	MF	(England) ENG	Andre Green (on loan from Aston Villa)	14	2	8+5	2	1+0	0	0+0	0
19	MF	(England) ENG	Albie Morgan	23	0	11+10	0	0+1	0	1+0	0
20	DF	(England) ENG	Chris Solly	15	0	12+2	0	1+0	0	0+0	0
21	MF	(Israel) ISR	Beram Kayal (on loan from Brighton & Hove Albion)	6	0	2+4	0	0+0	0	0+0	0
21	MF	(Wales) WAL	Matthew Smith (on loan from Manchester City)	2	0	0+2	0	0+0	0	0+0	0
23	DF	(France) FRA	Naby Sarr	31	3	26+3	3	1+0	0	1+0	0
24	MF	(Republic of Ireland) IRL	Josh Cullen (on loan from West Ham United)	34	1	34+0	1	0+0	0	0+0	0
26	FW	(Israel) ISR	Tomer Hemed	19	0	9+9	0	0+1	0	0+0	0
27	MF	(England) ENG	David Davis (on loan from Birmingham City)	5	0	5+0	0	0+0	0	0+0	0
28	MF	(England) ENG	Sam Field (on loan from West Bromwich Albion)	18	0	10+7	0	0+0	0	1+0	0
29	MF	(Turkey) TUR	Erhun Oztumer	14	0	11+3	0	0+0	0	0+0	0
30	GK	(Australia) AUS	Ashley Maynard-Brewer	0	0	0+0	0	0+0	0	0+0	0
31	GK	(England) ENG	Nathan Harness	0	0	0+0	0	0+0	0	0+0	0
32	MF	(England) ENG	George Lapslie	11	1	4+6	1	0+0	0	1+0	0
33	MF	(England) ENG	Ben Dempsey	4	0	3+1	0	0+0	0	0+0	0
35	FW	(England) ENG	Wilberforce Ocran	1	0	0+0	0	0+0	0	0+1	0
36	MF	(England) ENG	Taylor Maloney	0	0	0+0	0	0+0	0	0+0	0
37	DF	(Ivory Coast) CIV	Kenneth Yao	0	0	0+0	0	0+0	0	0+0	0
38	MF	(Guinea-Bissau) GBS	Junior Quitirna	1	0	0+0	0	0+0	0	0+1	0
40	MF	(England) ENG	Brendan Sarpong-Wiredu	2	0	0+0	0	1+0	0	1+0	0
42	MF	(England) ENG	Abraham Odoh	1	0	0+0	0	1+0	0	0+0	0
43	DF	(England) ENG	Toby Stevenson	1	0	0+0	0	1+0	0	0+0	0
44	FW	(England) ENG	Josh Davison	10	1	5+4	1	1+0	0	0+0	0
45	MF	(England) ENG	Alfie Doughty	30	2	20+9	2	0+0	0	1+0	0
46	MF	(England) ENG	James Vennings	4	0	0+3	0	1+0	0	0+0	0
47	MF	(England) ENG	Johl Powell	0	0	0+0	0	0+0	0	0+0	0
48	MF	(England) ENG	Aaron Henry	1	0	0+0	0	1+0	0	0+0	0

=== Top scorers ===
As of 22 July 2020

Place	Position	Nation	Number	Name	Championship	FA Cup	League Cup	Total
1	FW	(Montserrat)	9	Lyle Taylor	11	0	0	11
=	FW	(Zimbabwe)	17	Macauley Bonne	11	0	0	11
3	MF	(England)	11	Conor Gallagher	6	0	0	6
4	FW	(England)	14	Jonathan Leko	5	0	0	5
5	DF	(France)	23	Naby Sarr	3	0	0	3
6	MF	(England)	18	Andre Green	2	0	0	2
=	DF	(England)	3	Ben Purrington	2	0	0	2
=	MF	(England)	15	Darren Pratley	2	0	0	2
=	MF	(England)	45	Alfie Doughty	2	0	0	2
10	FW	(England)	10	Chuks Aneke	1	0	0	1
=	MF	(Republic of Ireland)	24	Josh Cullen	1	0	0	1
=	FW	(England)	44	Josh Davison	1	0	0	1
=	DF	(Wales)	5	Tom Lockyer	1	0	0	1
=	MF	(England)	32	George Lapslie	1	0	0	1
=	DF	(England)	6	Jason Pearce	1	0	0	1
Totals					50	0	0	50

=== Disciplinary record ===
As of 22 July 2020

Number	Nation	Position	Name	Championship		FA Cup		League Cup		Total	
Number	Nation	Position	Name	Booked	Sent off (straight red)	Booked	Sent off (straight red)	Booked	Sent off (straight red)	Booked	Sent off (straight red)
15	(England)	MF	Darren Pratley	11	0	0	0	0	0	11	0
5	(Wales)	DF	Tom Lockyer	11	0	0	0	0	0	11	0
11	(England)	MF	Conor Gallagher	8	0	0	0	0	0	8	0
24	(Republic of Ireland)	MF	Josh Cullen	7	0	0	0	0	0	7	0
4	(England)	DF	Deji Oshilaja	6	0	0	0	0	0	6	0
1	(England)	GK	Dillon Phillips	6	0	0	0	0	0	6	0
17	(Zimbabwe)	FW	Macauley Bonne	5	0	0	0	0	0	5	0
2	(Wales)	DF	Adam Matthews	4	0	0	0	0	0	4	0
9	(Montserrat)	FW	Lyle Taylor	4	0	0	0	0	0	4	0
3	(England)	DF	Ben Purrington	4	0	0	0	0	0	4	0
6	(England)	DF	Jason Pearce	4	0	0	0	0	0	4	0
19	(England)	MF	Albie Morgan	4	0	0	0	0	0	4	0
23	(France)	DF	Naby Sarr	3	0	0	0	0	0	3	0
32	(England)	MF	George Lapslie	3	0	0	0	0	0	3	0
8	(England)	MF	Jake Forster-Caskey	3	0	0	0	0	0	3	0
10	(England)	FW	Chuks Aneke	2	0	0	0	1	0	3	0
21	(Israel)	MF	Beram Kayal	2	0	0	0	0	0	2	0
14	(England)	FW	Jonathan Leko	2	0	0	0	0	0	2	0
20	(England)	DF	Chris Solly	2	0	0	0	0	0	2	0
27	(England)	MF	David Davis	2	0	0	0	0	0	2	0
45	(England)	MF	Alfie Doughty	2	0	0	0	0	0	2	0
28	(England)	MF	Sam Field	1	0	0	0	0	0	1	0
33	(England)	MF	Ben Dempsey	1	0	0	0	0	0	1	0
18	(England)	MF	Andre Green	1	0	0	0	0	0	1	0
21	(Wales)	MF	Matthew Smith	1	0	0	0	0	0	1	0
26	(Israel)	FW	Tomer Hemed	1	0	0	0	0	0	1	0
7	(Wales)	MF	Jonny Williams	1	0	0	0	0	0	1	0
40	(England)	MF	Brendan Sarpong-Wiredu	0	0	1	0	0	0	1	0
Totals				101	0	1	0	1	0	103	0

== Transfers ==
=== Transfers in ===
Date from	Position	Nationality	Name	From	Fee	Ref.
1 July 2019	CF	(England)	Chuks Aneke	(England) Milton Keynes Dons	Free transfer	
1 July 2019	CF	(Zimbabwe)	Macauley Bonne	(England) Leyton Orient	Undiscolsed	
1 July 2019	MF	(England)	Charles Clayden	(England) Leyton Orient	Undisclosed	
1 July 2019	GK	(England)	Nathan Harness	(England) Dunstable Town	Undisclosed	
1 July 2019	CB	(Wales)	Tom Lockyer	(England) Bristol Rovers	Free transfer	
1 July 2019	DM	(England)	Jay Mingi	(England) West Ham United	Free transfer	
1 July 2019	MF	(England)	Abraham Odoh	(England) Tooting & Mitcham United	Undisclosed	
1 July 2019	DF	(England)	Luca Vega	(England) Ipswich Town	Free transfer	
2 July 2019	LB	(England)	Ben Purrington	(England) Rotherham United	Undisclosed	
15 July 2019	GK	(England)	Ben Amos	(England) Bolton Wanderers	Free transfer	
18 July 2019	AM	(Wales)	Jonny Williams	Free agent	Free transfer	
22 July 2019	CB	(England)	Deji Oshilaja	(England) AFC Wimbledon	Free transfer	
16 August 2019	AM	(Turkey)	Erhun Oztumer	(England) Bolton Wanderers	Free transfer	
19 August 2019	CF	(Israel)	Tomer Hemed	(England) Brighton & Hove Albion	Undisclosed	
5 September 2019	RB	(Wales)	Adam Matthews	(England) Sunderland	Free transfer	
18 October 2019	CF	(England)	Josh Davison	(England) Enfield Town	Free transfer	
6 December 2019	CM	(Wales)	Joe Ledley	Free agent	Free transfer	

=== Transfers out ===
Date from	Position	Nationality	Name	To	Fee	Ref.
1 July 2019	CF	(England)	Nicky Ajose	(England) Exeter City	Released	
1 July 2019	CF	(England)	Terrique Anderson	Free agent	Released	
1 July 2019	CM	(Nigeria)	Joe Aribo	(Scotland) Rangers	Compensation	
1 July 2019	CB	(Germany)	Patrick Bauer	(England) Preston North End	Free transfer	
1 July 2019	CB	(Antigua and Barbuda)	Daniel Bowry	(England) Cheltenham Town	Released	
1 July 2019	CF	(England)	Luke Carey	Free agent	Released	
1 July 2019	CB	(England)	Jo Cummings	(England) Scunthorpe United	Released	
1 July 2019	AM	(England)	Tariqe Fosu	(England) Oxford United	Free transfer	
1 July 2019	FW	(England)	Reeco Hackett-Fairchild	(England) Bromley	Released	
1 July 2019	CF	(Northern Ireland)	Mikhail Kennedy	Retired	—N/a	
1 July 2019	RW	(Jamaica)	Mark Marshall	(England) Gillingham	Released	
1 July 2019	DF	(England)	Jamie Mascoll	(England) Wycombe Wanderers	Released	
1 July 2019	CF	(Antigua and Barbuda)	Josh Parker	(England) Wycombe Wanderers	Released	
1 July 2019	AM	(Northern Ireland)	Ben Reeves	(England) Milton Keynes Dons	Released	
1 July 2019	CF	(England)	Josh Umerah	(England) Ebbsfleet United	Released	
1 July 2019	CF	(Angola)	Igor Vetokele	(Belgium) Westerlo	Released	
1 July 2019	AM	(Wales)	Jonny Williams	(England) Charlton Athletic	Released	
8 July 2019	LB	(Zimbabwe)	Jordan Zemura	(England) AFC Bournemouth	Free transfer	
7 August 2019	RB	(Netherlands)	Anfernee Dijksteel	(England) Middlesbrough	Undisclosed	
6 January 2020	CM	(Wales)	Joe Ledley	(Australia) Newcastle Jets	Released	
1 July 2020	RB	(England)	Chris Solly	(England) Ebbsfleet United	Released	
1 July 2020	CF	(Montserrat)	Lyle Taylor	(England) Nottingham Forest	Released	
1 July 2020	CF	(England)	Kareem Isiaka	Free agent	Released	
1 July 2020	DF	(England)	Sam Keefe	(England) Worthing	Released	
1 July 2020	MF	(England)	Taylor Maloney	(England) Bromley	Released	
1 July 2020	CF	(England)	Wilberforce Ocran	(England) Farnborough	Released	
1 July 2020	MF	(England)	Abraham Odoh	(England) Rochdale	Released	
1 July 2020	DF	(England)	Toby Stevenson	(England) Watford	Released	
1 July 2020	DF	(Ivory Coast)	Kenneth Yao	Free agent	Released	

=== Loans in ===
Date from	Position	Nationality	Name	From	Date until	Ref.
2 August 2019	CM	(England)	Conor Gallagher	(England) Chelsea	14 January 2020	
7 August 2019	CM	(Republic of Ireland)	Josh Cullen	(England) West Ham United	30 June 2020	
8 August 2019	CM	(England)	Sam Field	(England) West Bromwich Albion	30 June 2020	
8 August 2019	RW	(England)	Jonathan Leko	(England) West Bromwich Albion	1 January 2020	
8 August 2019	CM	(Israel)	Beram Kayal	(England) Brighton & Hove Albion	15 January 2020	
2 January 2020	LW	(England)	Andre Green	(England) Aston Villa	30 June 2020	
31 January 2020	LW	(Republic of Ireland)	Aiden McGeady	(England) Sunderland	30 June 2020	
31 January 2020	DM	(Wales)	Matthew Smith	(England) Manchester City	30 June 2020	
31 January 2020	CM	(England)	David Davis	(England) Birmingham City	30 June 2020	

=== Loans out ===
Date from	Position	Nationality	Name	To	Date until	Ref.
1 August 2019	MF	(England)	Taylor Maloney	(Wales) Newport County	3 January 2020	
5 August 2019	GK	(Australia)	Ashley Maynard-Brewer	(England) Dulwich Hamlet	2 September 2019	
2 September 2019	MF	(England)	Brendan Sarpong-Wiredu	(England) Colchester United	3 January 2020	
7 September 2019	MF	(England)	Alfie Doughty	(England) Bromley	5 October 2019	
10 October 2019	MF	(England)	Albie Morgan	(England) Ebbsfleet United	19 November 2019	
25 October 2019	MF	(England)	Eddie Allsopp	(England) Barking	24 November 2019	
2 November 2019	DF	(England)	Toby Stevenson	(England) Dagenham & Redbridge	3 January 2020	
8 November 2019	MF	(England)	Ben Dempsey	(England) Dulwich Hamlet	7 December 2019	
7 January 2020	GK	(England)	Nathan Harness	(England) Billericay Town	6 February 2020	
30 January 2020	GK	(Australia)	Ashley Maynard-Brewer	(England) Dover Athletic	25 April 2020	
8 February 2020	GK	(England)	Joseph Osaghae	(England) Tilbury	25 April 2020	
10 February 2020	MF	(England)	Ben Dempsey	(England) Woking	25 April 2020	
14 February 2020	MF	(England)	Taylor Maloney	(England) Concord Rangers	25 April 2020	
14 February 2020	FW	(England)	Wilberforce Ocran	(England) Brentwood Town	25 April 2020	
14 February 2020	DF	(England)	Sam Keefe	(England) Tilbury	25 April 2020	

== Friendlies ==
On 3 June 2019, Charlton Athletic announced its first confirmed friendly taking place ahead of the 2019/20 season would be against Dagenham & Redbridge at The Chigwell Construction Stadium. A day later, two further fixtures against Welling United and Ebbsfleet United were added. On 7 June 2019, Charlton Athletic announced it had arranged a fourth friendly that would also act as long-serving defender Chris Solly's testimonial match against Aston Villa at The Valley. It was announced on 10 June that a further friendly had been organised at Colchester United. A sixth friendly against Gillingham was organised on 17 June 2019. A final behind-closed-doors friendly against CS Gaz Metan Mediaș was organised for the club's Spanish training camp.

4 July 2019 Friendly	Charlton Athletic	A–A	Gaz Metan Mediaș	La Cala de Mijas, Spain
19:00 CEST (70 minute game)	Lapslie 13'	Report		Stadium: Campo Hotel La Cala; Attendance: 0 Referee: Raul Mateo

13 July 2019 Friendly	Welling United	0–2	Charlton Athletic	Welling
15:00 BST		Report	Sarpong-Wiredu 16'; Odoh 35'	Stadium: Park View Road; Attendance: 2,052; Referee: Isaac Searle

16 July 2019 Friendly	Ebbsfleet United	2–1	Charlton Athletic	Northfleet
19:30 BST	Obileye 43' (pen.); Trialist 56'	Report	Sarpong-Wiredu 89'	Stadium: Stonebridge Road; Referee: Michael Ryan

17 July 2019 Friendly	Dagenham & Redbridge	0–4	Charlton Athletic	Dagenham
19:30 BST		Report	Sarpong-Wiredu 4'; Lockyer 9'; Bonne 45+1'; Dempsey 76'	Stadium: The Chigwell Construction Stadium; Attendance: 683; Referee: Tony Goddard

20 July 2019 Friendly	Gillingham	3–1	Charlton Athletic	Gillingham
14:00 BST	O'Keefe 13'; Ndjoli 48'; List 89'	Report	Aneke 43'	Stadium: Priestfield Stadium; Referee: Chris Pollard

23 July 2019 Friendly	Colchester United	1–2	Charlton Athletic	Colchester
19:30 BST	Norris 49'	Report	Odoh 69'; Sarpong-Wiredu 90'	Stadium: Colchester Community Stadium; Referee: T. Robinson

27 July 2019 Friendly (Chris Solly Testimonial)	Charlton Athletic	1–4	Aston Villa	Charlton
15:00 BST	Taylor 65' (pen.)	Report	El Ghazi 38'; Green 55'; McGinn 57', 83'	Stadium: The Valley; Attendance: 7,532; Referee: Charles Breakspear

6 June 2020 Friendly	Arsenal	6–0	Charlton Athletic	Holloway
15:00 BST	Lacazette (?); Aubameyang (?); Nketiah (?); Willock (?)	Report		Stadium: Emirates Stadium; Attendance: 0 Referee: Coaching staff from both teams

== Competitions ==
=== League table ===
Pos	Team	Pld	W	D	L	GF	GA	GD	Pts	Promotion, qualification or relegation
19	Luton Town	46	14	9	23	54	82	−28	51	
20	Birmingham City	46	12	14	20	54	75	−21	50	
21	Barnsley	46	12	13	21	49	69	−20	49	
22	Charlton Athletic (R)	46	12	12	22	50	65	−15	48	Relegation to EFL League One
23	Wigan Athletic (R)	46	15	14	17	57	56	+1	47 (Note: As a result of Wigan Athletic entering administration, the club was subject to a 12-point deduction. In accordance with EFL regulations, the timing of the sporting sanction was only determined once final league placings in the Championship were determined. Since the club did not finish in the relegation places at the end of season, the sanction was applied to their 2019–20 total and final league standings were amended as appropriate.)	Relegation to EFL League One
24	Hull City (R)	46	12	9	25	57	87	−30	45	Relegation to EFL League One

Source: EFL Official Website
Rules for classification: 1) Points; 2) Goal difference; 3) Number of goals scored; 4) Head-to-head results; 5) Wins; 6) Away goals; 7) Penalty points (sec 9.5); 8) 12-point sending off offences
(R) Relegated

==== Result summary ====
Overall								Home						Away					
Pld	W	D	L	GF	GA	GD	Pts	W	D	L	GF	GA	GD	W	D	L	GF	GA	GD
46	12	12	22	50	65	−15	48	8	6	9	28	27	+1	4	6	13	22	38	−16

Last updated: 22 July 2020.

==== Results by round ====
Round	1	2	3	4	5	6	7	8	9	10	11	12	13	14	15	16	17	18	19	20	21	22	23	24	25	26	27	28	29	30	31	32	33	34	35	36	37	38	39	40	41	42	43	44	45	46
Ground	A	H	A	H	H	A	H	A	H	H	A	H	A	A	H	A	H	A	H	A	H	H	A	H	A	A	H	A	H	H	A	A	H	H	A	A	H	A	H	A	H	A	H	A	H	A
Result	W	W	D	D	W	W	L	L	W	L	D	W	L	D	L	L	D	L	L	L	L	D	D	W	L	L	D	L	D	W	L	W	L	W	L	L	L	W	W	D	L	L	L	D	D	L
Position	4	2	2	5	3	2	3	8	6	8	10	7	10	9	10	11	13	17	17	17	17	17	18	17	19	19	19	19	21	19	21	19	19	18	18	20	22	19	18	18	19	20	21	21	21	22

Updated to match(es) played on 22 July 2020. Source:
A = Away; H = Home; W = Win; D = Draw; L = Loss

==== Matches ====
On Thursday, 20 June 2019, the EFL Championship fixtures were revealed.

3 August 2019 1	Blackburn Rovers	1–2	Charlton Athletic	Blackburn
15:00 BST	Phillips 54' (o.g.)	Report	Purrington 43'; Taylor 77'	Stadium: Ewood Park; Attendance: 14,184; Referee: Andy Woolmer

10 August 2019 2	Charlton Athletic	3–1	Stoke City	Charlton
15:00 BST	Taylor 25'; Aneke 75'; Gallagher 83'	Report	Ince 37'	Stadium: The Valley; Attendance: 17,848; Referee: Simon Hooper

17 August 2019 3	Barnsley	2–2	Charlton Athletic	Barnsley
15:00 BST	Woodrow 34'; Chaplin 48'	Report	Gallagher 40'; Taylor 89' (pen.)	Stadium: Oakwell; Attendance: 13,006; Referee: Matt Donohue

21 August 2019 4	Charlton Athletic	1–1	Nottingham Forest	Charlton
19:45 BST	Taylor 18'	Report	Adomah 78'	Stadium: The Valley; Attendance: 17,204; Referee: Oliver Langford

24 August 2019 5	Charlton Athletic	1–0	Brentford	Charlton
15:00 BST	Gallagher 41'	Report		Stadium: The Valley; Attendance: 16,711; Referee: Tim Robinson

31 August 2019 6	Reading	0–2	Charlton Athletic	Reading
15:00 BST		Report	Leko 51'; Taylor 80' (pen.)	Stadium: Madejski Stadium; Attendance: 16,906; Referee: Jarred Gillett

14 September 2019 7	Charlton Athletic	0–1	Birmingham City	Charlton
15:00 BST		Report	Bellingham 52'	Stadium: The Valley; Attendance: 18,752; Referee: Matt Donohue

21 September 2019 8	Wigan Athletic	2–0	Charlton Athletic	Wigan
15:00 BST	Dunkley 22', 70'	Report		Stadium: DW Stadium; Attendance: 9,567; Referee: Andy Davies

28 September 2019 9	Charlton Athletic	1–0	Leeds United	Charlton
15:00 BST	Bonne 32'	Report		Stadium: The Valley; Attendance: 21,808; Referee: John Brooks

2 October 2019 10	Charlton Athletic	1–2	Swansea City	Charlton
19:45 BST	Leko 2'	Report	Dhanda 17'; Ayew 65'	Stadium: The Valley; Attendance: 15,741; Referee: Peter Bankes

5 October 2019 11	Fulham	2–2	Charlton Athletic	Fulham
12:30 BST	Cavaleiro 55'; Mitrović 63'	Report	Gallagher 41'; Bonne 57'	Stadium: Craven Cottage; Attendance: 18,654; Referee: Keith Stroud

19 October 2019 12	Charlton Athletic	3–0	Derby County	Charlton
15:00 BST	Bonne 6'; Sarr 48'; Gallagher 67'	Report		Stadium: The Valley; Attendance: 19,408; Referee: Steve Martin

23 October 2019 13	Bristol City	2–1	Charlton Athletic	Bristol
19:45 BST	Diédhiou 75'; Brownhill 90+8'	Report	Bonne 65'	Stadium: Ashton Gate; Attendance: 20,916; Referee: James Linington

26 October 2019 14	West Bromwich Albion	2–2	Charlton Athletic	West Bromwich
15:00 BST	Phillips 10'; Robson-Kanu 81'	Report	Bonne 60'; Cullen 90+4' (pen.)	Stadium: The Hawthorns; Attendance: 25,356; Referee: Matt Donahue

3 November 2019 15	Charlton Athletic	0–1	Preston North End	Charlton
12:00 GMT		Report	Gallagher 58' (pen.)	Stadium: The Valley; Attendance: 16,027; Referee: David Webb

9 November 2019 16	Millwall	2–1	Charlton Athletic	Bermondsey
15:00 GMT	Hutchinson 6'; Smith 90+1'	Report	Leko 51'	Stadium: The Den; Attendance: 17,109; Referee: Robert Jones

23 November 2019 17	Charlton Athletic	2–2	Cardiff City	Charlton
12:30 GMT	Gallagher 13'; Leko 42'	Report	Mendez-Laing 52'; Tomlin 73'	Stadium: The Valley; Attendance: 16,011; Referee: Darren Bond

26 November 2019 18	Luton Town	2–1	Charlton Athletic	Luton
19:45 GMT	Mpanzu 19'; Brown 53'	Report	Leko 7'	Stadium: Kenilworth Road; Attendance: 10,004; Referee: Darren England

30 November 2019 19	Charlton Athletic	1–3	Sheffield Wednesday	Charlton
12:30 GMT	Bonne 26'	Report	Fletcher 17', 80' (pen.); Nuhiu 90+4'	Stadium: The Valley; Attendance: 18,338; Referee: Tim Robinson

7 December 2019 20	Middlesbrough	1–0	Charlton Athletic	Middlesbrough
15:00 GMT	Saville 1'	Report		Stadium: Riverside Stadium; Attendance: 18,681; Referee: Steve Martin

10 December 2019 21	Charlton Athletic	0–1	Huddersfield Town	Charlton
19:55 GMT		Report	Daly 90+2'	Stadium: The Valley; Attendance: 13,488; Referee: Graham Scott

13 December 2019 22	Charlton Athletic	2–2	Hull City	Charlton
19:45 GMT	Pratley 34'; Sarr 50'	Report	Bowen 47'; Phillips 90+6' (o.g.)	Stadium: The Valley; Attendance: 14,447; Referee: Andy Davies

21 December 2019 23	Queens Park Rangers	2–2	Charlton Athletic	White City
15:00 GMT	Cameron 6'; Pugh 70'	Report	Taylor 56'; Sarr 90+5'	Stadium: Loftus Road; Attendance: 16,166; Referee: Matthew Donohue

26 December 2019 24	Charlton Athletic	3–2	Bristol City	Charlton
15:00 GMT	Bonne 40', 77'; Doughty 82'	Report	Weimann 46'; Eliasson 60'	Stadium: The Valley; Attendance: 18,058; Referee: Keith Stroud

30 December 2019 25	Derby County	2–1	Charlton Athletic	Derby
19:45 GMT	Knight 10', 77'	Report	Taylor 83' (pen.)	Stadium: Pride Park; Attendance: 26,058; Referee: Jeremy Simpson

2 January 2020 26	Swansea City	1–0	Charlton Athletic	Swansea
19:45 GMT	Dhanda 14'	Report		Stadium: Liberty Stadium; Attendance: 15,352; Referee: Peter Bankes

11 January 2020 27	Charlton Athletic	2–2	West Bromwich Albion	Charlton
15:00 GMT	Davison 28'; Lockyer 76'	Report	Zohore 22'; Robson-Kanu 46'	Stadium: The Valley; Attendance: 19,720; Referee: Jarred Gillett

18 January 2020 28	Preston North End	2–1	Charlton Athletic	Preston
15:00 GMT	Harrop 31'; Bauer 52'	Report	Green 5'	Stadium: Deepdale; Attendance: 12,358; Referee: Dean Whitestone

22 January 2020 29	Charlton Athletic	0–0	Fulham	Charlton
19:45 GMT		Report		Stadium: The Valley; Attendance: 16,424; Referee: Stephen Martin

1 February 2020 30	Charlton Athletic	2–1	Barnsley	Charlton
15:00 GMT	Taylor 9'; Green 45+2'	Report	Woodrow 71'	Stadium: The Valley; Attendance: 19,870; Referee: John Brooks

8 February 2020 31	Stoke City	3–1	Charlton Athletic	Stoke-on-Trent
15:00 GMT	McClean 28'; Ince 47'; Powell 66'	Report	Purrington 45+1'	Stadium: bet365 Stadium; Attendance: 23,508; Referee: Jarred Gillett

11 February 2020 32	Nottingham Forest	0–1	Charlton Athletic	Nottingham
19:45 GMT		Report	Taylor 24'	Stadium: City Ground; Referee: Darren Bond

15 February 2020 33	Charlton Athletic	0–2	Blackburn Rovers	Charlton
15:00 GMT		Report	Buckley 29'; Adarabioyo 37'	Stadium: The Valley; Attendance: 25,363; Referee: Andy Davies

22 February 2020 34	Charlton Athletic	3–1	Luton Town	Charlton
15:00 GMT	Taylor 34', 61' (pen.); Lapslie 87'	Report	Cornick 36'	Stadium: The Valley; Attendance: 18,969; Referee: Andre Marriner

26 February 2020 35	Sheffield Wednesday	1–0	Charlton Athletic	Sheffield
19:45 GMT	Fletcher 90+5'	Report		Stadium: Hillsborough; Attendance: 21,370; Referee: Oliver Langford

29 February 2020 36	Huddersfield Town	4–0	Charlton Athletic	Huddersfield
15:00 GMT	Grant 25', 90'; Mounié 75'; Bacuna 90+4'	Report		Stadium: Kirklees Stadium; Attendance: 21,539; Referee: Geoff Eltringham

7 March 2020 37	Charlton Athletic	0–1	Middlesbrough	Charlton
15:00 GMT		Report	McNair 17'	Stadium: The Valley; Attendance: 18,080; Referee: Stephen Martin

20 June 2020 38	Hull City	0–1	Charlton Athletic	Kingston upon Hull
15:00 BST		Report	Pearce 18'	Stadium: KCOM Stadium; Attendance: 0 Referee: Darren England

27 June 2020 39	Charlton Athletic	1–0	Queens Park Rangers	Charlton
12:30 BST	Pratley 12'	Report		Stadium: The Valley; Attendance: 0 Referee: Tim Robinson

30 June 2020 40	Cardiff City	0–0	Charlton Athletic	Cardiff
18:00 BST		Report		Stadium: Cardiff City Stadium; Attendance: 0 Referee: Stephen Martin

3 July 2020 41	Charlton Athletic	0–1	Millwall	Charlton
20:15 BST		Report	Cooper 81'	Stadium: The Valley; Attendance: 0 Referee: Dean Whitestone

7 July 2020 42	Brentford	2–1	Charlton Athletic	Brentford
18:00 BST	Benrahma 75' (pen.); Pinnock 85'	Report	Bonne 8'	Stadium: Griffin Park; Attendance: 0 Referee: John Brooks

11 July 2020 43	Charlton Athletic	0–1	Reading	Charlton
12:30 BST		Report	Pușcaș 3' (pen.)	Stadium: The Valley; Attendance: 0 Referee: Darren Bond

15 July 2020 44	Birmingham City	1–1	Charlton Athletic	Birmingham
18:00 BST	Jutkiewicz 90+3'	Report	Bonne 58'	Stadium: St Andrew's; Attendance: 0 Referee: David Webb

18 July 2020 45	Charlton Athletic	2–2	Wigan Athletic	Charlton
12:30 BST	Doughty 11'; Bonne 90+3'	Report	Lowe 9'; Dowell 40'	Stadium: The Valley; Attendance: 0 Referee: Gavin Ward

22 July 2020 46	Leeds United	4–0	Charlton Athletic	Leeds
19:30 BST	White 13'; Dallas 28'; Roberts 51'; Shackleton 66'	Report		Stadium: Elland Road; Attendance: 0 Referee: Geoff Eltringham

=== FA Cup ===
On 2 December 2019, Charlton Athletic were drawn home to West Bromwich Albion in the third round.

5 January 2020 Third round	Charlton Athletic	0–1	West Bromwich Albion	Charlton
14:01 GMT		Report	Zohore 32'	Stadium: The Valley; Attendance: 6,426; Referee: David Webb

=== EFL Cup ===
On 20 June 2019, Charlton Athletic were drawn home to Forest Green Rovers in the first round.

13 August 2019 First round	Charlton Athletic	0–0 (3–5 p)	Forest Green Rovers	Charlton
19:45 BST		Report		Stadium: The Valley; Attendance: 2,693; Referee: John Busby
	Penalties
	Bonne (penalty scored); Sarr (penalty scored); Morgan (penalty missed); Oshilaja (penalty scored)		J. Mills (penalty scored); Grubb (penalty scored); Adams (penalty scored); Morton (penalty scored); McCoulsky (penalty scored)

=== Kent Senior Cup ===
4 December 2019 Second round	Phoenix Sports	2–1	Charlton Athletic	Barnhurst
19:45 GMT	Chin 53'; Duah-Kessie 54'	Report	Quitirna 26' (pen.)	Stadium: Phoenix Sports Ground; Attendance: 220; Referee: Ben Atkinson
