= Macauley Bonne =

Zimbabwean footballer (born 1995)

- Boone in 2026

Personal information
- Full name: Macauley Miles Bonne
- Date of birth: 26 October 1995 (age 31)
- Place of birth: Ipswich, England
- Height: 5 ft 11 in (1.80 m)
- Position: Striker

Team information
- Current team: Billericay Town
- Number: 12

Youth career
- 2003–2009: Ipswich Town
- 2009: Norwich City
- 2009–2013: Colchester United

Senior career*
Years	Team	Apps	(Gls)
2013–2017	Colchester United	75	(7)
2016	→ Lincoln City (loan)	7	(1)
2017	→ Woking (loan)	7	(0)
2017–2019	Leyton Orient	90	(45)
2019–2020	Charlton Athletic	36	(11)
2020–2023	Queens Park Rangers	42	(3)
2021–2022	→ Ipswich Town (loan)	43	(12)
2023	Charlton Athletic	16	(2)
2023–2024	Gillingham	25	(4)
2024	→ Cambridge United (loan)	16	(1)
2024–2025	Southend United	39	(5)
2025–2026	Maldon & Tiptree	7	(2)
2026–	Billericay Town	17	(6)

International career^{‡}
2014–	Zimbabwe	8	(2)
- * Club domestic league appearances and goals as of 17:10, 5 September 2026 (UTC) ‡ National team caps and goals as of 20:45, 30 December 2025 (UTC)

Macauley Miles Bonne (born 26 October 1995) is a professional footballer who plays as a striker for Isthmian League side Billericay Town. Born in England, he plays for the Zimbabwe national team.

Bonne progressed through the Colchester United Academy, having previously spent six years with hometown club Ipswich Town between the age of eight and 14, with a brief spell at Norwich City separating the two. He made his professional debut for Colchester in 2013, and scored his first professional goal on his 18th birthday in a match against Peterborough United. He went on loan to Lincoln City during September and October 2016 and Woking during January and February 2017. He joined Leyton Orient in July 2017. After scoring 45 goals in the two seasons he played at Leyton Orient, he signed for Charlton Athletic for £200,000. He then moved to Queens Park Rangers for an undisclosed fee early in the 2020–21 season.

Bonne has represented Zimbabwe at full international and under-23 levels.

== Club career ==
=== Colchester United ===
Born in Ipswich, Bonne began his career with hometown club Ipswich Town from under-8 level. He remained with the club until he reached under-14 level, spending a brief period at Norwich City before moving to Colchester United's Academy to continue his development.

Bonne was prolific in front of goal when he joined Colchester, and worked his way up to under-18 level. Until making his first-team debut, Bonne had scored 46 goals in 54 under-18 appearances. In the 2013–14 season, Bonne had scored ten goals in just two FA Youth Cup fixtures. This form prompted manager Joe Dunne to call him up to the first-team squad, having featured on the bench during the 2012–13 season.

==== 2013–14 season ====
On 22 October 2013, Bonne was brought on as an 86th-minute substitute for David Wright to make his Football League debut as manager Dunne pushed for a winner during a 1–1 draw with Shrewsbury Town. Following the game, Bonne said that he was "absolutely buzzing" having made his debut and that he hoped to have many more opportunities in the first-team.

On his 18th birthday and home debut for the U's on 26 October, Bonne was brought on as a 62nd-minute substitute for Clinton Morrison. He consequently scored his debut goal and the match winner eight minutes after arriving on the field in a 1–0 victory over Peterborough United. Bonne said that the occasion was "probably one of the best days of my life". He went on to score on his first start for the club on 9 November in a 3–2 FA Cup defeat to Sheffield United, and then made his first league start one week later in Colchester's 2–1 home defeat by Swindon Town. After Dunne allowed Bonne a rest for the 1–1 draw with Preston North End on 23 November, he was drafted back to the substitutes bench for the midweek clash against Milton Keynes Dons three days later. Coming on as a substitute for Dominic Vose in the 68th minute, Bonne scored his second league goal and his third goal in six games ten minutes after his arrival to seal a 3–1 win for Colchester.

He made 15 league and cup appearances for Colchester through his debut season, scoring three goals.

Alongside featuring in the first-team, Bonne also helped the club's under-18 side to a league title and cup winning double during the season. He scored in the Youth Alliance Cup final on 29 April 2014, contributing towards Colchester's 4–2 win against Bradford City at Valley Parade.

==== 2014–15 season ====
Bonne featured in the league for the first time in the 2014–15 season and for the first time under new boss Tony Humes on 1 November 2014, coming on as a second-half substitute for Rhys Healey in Colchester's 2–1 home defeat by Port Vale.

Having made just two substitute appearances until 16 January 2015, manager Humes told Bonne that he must "be patient, and he's got to wait his turn" with the form of Freddie Sears keeping Bonne out of the team. Bonne then started his first game of the season at home to Bristol City on 21 February 2015. His selection paid dividends when he scored Colchester's second goal of the game in the 14th minute with a diving header in the 3–2 win. It would prove to be his only goal of the season. Five days later, with his contract set to expire in the summer, Bonne signed a 2 1/2-year contract extension to remain with the U's until 2017. He featured in ten games across the campaign.

==== 2015–16 season ====
Following an injury to Colchester's captain Chris Porter, Bonne was drafted in to replace him and lead the attack for the League Cup game against Reading on 11 August 2015, and then the League One game against Peterborough United on 15 August. In the league match, Bonne continued his good scoring form against Peterborough by scoring the opening goal after 30 minutes of a 2–1 defeat for the U's at London Road. He scored his first brace of goals for the club on 1 September, scoring both Colchester's goals in their 3–2 Football League Trophy defeat to Northampton Town.

Bonne scored four goals in Colchester's FA Cup first round tie away to Wealdstone on 7 November, becoming only the tenth Colchester United player to do so and equalling a club record in the process. He joined the likes of Arthur Pritchard, Arthur Turner, Vic Keeble, Neil Langman, Bobby Hunt, Martyn King, Bobby Svarc, Roy McDonough, and Chris Iwelumo, the last of whom scored the most recent quadruple on 28 November 2006. It was also the first time since 6 April 2007 that a Colchester United player had recorded a hat-trick. Bonne opened the scoring in the 6–2 win, first scoring after 26 minutes, before levelling with a header just before half-time after Wealdstone had scored two goals. He sealed his hat-trick just after half-time, before rounding off his scoring in the 68th minute with a deflected header from a George Moncur effort.

He ended the season as the club's second-highest goalscorer with nine goals in 37 games. He signed a new two-year contract on 22 June ahead of the new season.

==== 2016–17 season ====
Bonne made one start and three substitute appearances in August 2016 before joining National League side Lincoln City on loan on 2 September. He joined until 26 October, his 21st birthday. He made his Lincoln debut as a substitute in their 2–1 win at Torquay United on 3 September. He scored on his first start for the club on 10 September, scoring the only goal in a win against Tranmere Rovers. Colchester recalled Bonne from his Lincoln loan on 13 October after making eight appearances.

Bonne scored his first Colchester goal since his Lincoln loan on 8 November with the equalising goal in the U's 1–1 draw with Charlton Athletic in the EFL Trophy. He also converted a penalty during the penalty shoot-out, which Colchester won 4–3.

On 27 January 2017, Bonne joined National League side Woking on a one-month loan deal. A day later, Bonne made his Woking debut in a 1–0 away victory against Eastleigh, featuring for 70 minutes before being replaced by Jake Caprice. He made seven appearances in total for Woking without scoring.

Bonne ended the season with two goals in 22 first-team appearances for Colchester.

=== Leyton Orient ===
On 14 July 2017, Bonne joined National League side Leyton Orient on a two-year deal for an undisclosed fee. He made his club debut on 5 August in Orient's 2–0 defeat at Sutton United. He then scored his first goal for the club on 15 August in their 6–1 defeat by Bromley. He registered Orient's first hat-trick at Brisbane Road since 2006 and his first for the club on 2 September in their 4–1 win against Guiseley. He ended the season with 25 goals in 52 games in all competitions.

Following a successful debut campaign for the O's, Bonne signed a new two-year contract with the club just one year into his existing deal. He signed until summer 2020 after scoring his first goals of the new season in Orient's match against Barrow on 11 August 2018.

=== Charlton Athletic ===
On 17 June 2019, Bonne signed for Charlton Athletic on a three-year deal. In the forwards' pecking order, Bonne was fourth behind Lyle Taylor, Tomer Hemed and Jonathan Leko, who joined during the same transfer window as Bonne and was previously deployed as a right winger. Charlton manager Lee Bowyer used two forwards most of the time, and when Taylor got injured during an international break with Montserrat national team and Hemed was struggling with minor injuries, Bonne was given his first start in Championship in gameweek 9 in a home match against Leeds United, in which he scored the only goal. He didn't hit the net against Swansea next gameweek, but in the next four matches he scored one goal each.

=== Queens Park Rangers ===
On 2 October 2020, Bonne signed for Queens Park Rangers on a three-year deal for an undisclosed fee. He scored his first goal for QPR on his debut, coming off the bench to score an injury time equaliser against Sheffield Wednesday.

==== Ipswich Town (loan) ====
On 26 June 2021, Bonne returned to his hometown club Ipswich Town, the same club that released him eleven years prior when he was 14, on a season long loan. He made his senior debut for the club on 7 August, coming on as a substitute in the 78th minute. He went on to score his first goal for the club in the same game in the 91st minute, earning the side a late 2–2 draw against Morecambe. His scoring form continued and on 20 October 2021, Bonne scored his 10th goal of the season during a 4–0 win over Portsmouth. His impressive performances for the Blues lead him to be voted Ipswich player of the month for both August and September, as well as speculation in the media as to whether QPR would recall him in January. On 14 January 2022, Ipswich confirmed that Bonne would see out his loan spell at the club. Bonne was unable to replicate his early goal-scoring form for the rest of the season, with him scoring just once in his last 30 matches. Despite this, he still ended the season as the club's second highest goalscorer with 12 goals.

=== Return to Charlton Athletic ===
On 12 January 2023, Bonne re-joined League One side Charlton Athletic on a deal until the end of the 2022–23 season.

On 13 May 2023, it was announced that Bonne would leave the club when his contract expired in June.

=== Gillingham ===
On 11 August 2023, Bonne signed for League Two club Gillingham.

On 1 February 2024, Bonne joined League One club Cambridge United on loan until the end of the season, reuniting with manager Neil Harris whom had brought the striker to Gillingham. On 15 May 2024, Gillingham announced that Bonne would be released in the summer when his contract expired.

=== Southend United ===
On 9 September 2024, Bonne signed for National League team Southend United on a one-year deal. He officially departed the club in August 2025 following the expiration of his contract.

=== Maldon & Tiptree ===
On 11 October 2025, Bonne joined Isthmian League North Division club Maldon & Tiptree.

=== Billericay Town ===
In February 2026, Bonne signed for Billericay Town in the Isthmian League Premier Division.

== International career ==
Born in England to Zimbabwean parents, Bonne is eligible to represent both England and Zimbabwe national teams at international level. In August 2014, Bonne made himself available for selection by Zimbabwe ahead of their qualification attempt for the 2016 Olympic Games.

Bonne made his debut for Zimbabwe in a friendly match against Morocco on 16 November 2014. The Zimbabwe team was made up entirely of players from the Zimbabwe under-23 side, although the match was classed as a full international by FIFA. Bonne had a dream start to his international career, scoring the opening goal after 18 minutes when he slotted the ball between the legs of Morocco goalkeeper Bono. However, despite his debut goal, Zimbabwe went on to lose the game 2–1, with the experience leaving Bonne hungry for more chances with the national side.

In August 2015, Bonne was called up by the senior Zimbabwe side for their 2017 Africa Cup of Nations qualifier against Guinea on 6 September. After pulling out of the squad due to club commitments, Bonne was called up again in March 2016 for Zimbabwe's qualifier against Swaziland on 25 March. Bonne was again forced to withdraw from the Zimbabwe squad, on this occasion due to passport technicalities.

In November 2016, Bonne was included in Callisto Pasuwa's squad ahead of an international friendly match against Tanzania.

Bonne made his first appearance for the senior national team on 8 November 2017, starting in Zimbabwe's 1–0 defeat to Lesotho. He played again three days later, coming on as a second-half substitute in a 3–1 defeat against Namibia.

On 11 November 2019 he withdrew from Zimbabwe's national team squad due to medical issues, having received his Zimbabwean passport three days earlier.

In August 2021, Bonne was once again called up to represent Zimbabwe for World Cup qualifiers against South Africa in Harare on 3 September and Ethiopia in Bahir Dar four days later. However he was unable to join up with the Zimbabwe national team due to the English Football League not allowing players to travel to countries on the UK government's red travel list as a result of restrictions caused by the COVID-19 pandemic.

After not playing international football for seven years, he returned to the Zimbabwe national team squad during the 2024 Four Nations Football Tournament. He played in both of Zimbabwe's matches as they finished as runners-up of the tournament; he also scored in the tournament during a 2–2 draw against Zambia which was won by Zimbabwe after a penalty shoot-out.

Bonne was also named in the Zimbabwe squad for the 2025 Africa Cup of Nations, and made his first appearance at a major tournament when he started The Warriors' opening-game defeat to Egypt on 22 December 2025.

== Career statistics ==
=== Club ===
As of match played 4 May 2026

Appearances and goals by club, season and competition
Club	Season	League			FA Cup		League Cup		Other		Total	
Club	Season	Division	Apps	Goals	Apps	Goals	Apps	Goals	Apps	Goals	Apps	Goals
Colchester United	2013–14	League One	14	2	1	1	0	0	0	0	15	3
Colchester United	2014–15	League One	10	1	0	0	0	0	0	0	10	1
Colchester United	2015–16	League One	33	3	2	4	1	0	1 (Note: Appearance in Football League Trophy)	2	37	9
Colchester United	2016–17	League Two	18	1	1	0	1	0	2 (Note: Appearance(s) in EFL Trophy)	1	22	2
Colchester United	Total		75	7	4	5	2	0	3	3	84	15
Lincoln City (loan)	2016–17	National League	7	1	0	0	–		0	0	7	1
Woking (loan)	2016–17	National League	7	0	–		–		–		7	0
Leyton Orient	2017–18	National League	44	22	3	1	–		5 (Note: Appearances in FA Trophy)	2	52	25
Leyton Orient	2018–19	National League	46	23	1	0	–		4	1	51	24
Leyton Orient	Total		90	45	4	1	–		9	3	103	49
Charlton Athletic	2019–20	Championship	33	11	0	0	1	0	–		34	11
Charlton Athletic	2020–21	League One	3	0	0	0	2	1	1	0	6	1
Charlton Athletic	Total		36	11	0	0	3	1	1	0	40	12
Queens Park Rangers	2020–21	Championship	34	3	1	0	0	0	–		35	3
Queens Park Rangers	2021–22	Championship	0	0	0	0	0	0	–		0	0
Queens Park Rangers	2022–23	Championship	8	0	0	0	1	0	–		9	0
Queens Park Rangers	Total		42	3	1	0	1	0	0	0	44	3
Ipswich Town (loan)	2021–22	League One	43	12	2	0	1	0	0	0	46	12
Charlton Athletic	2022–23	League One	16	2	–		–		–		16	2
Gillingham	2023–24	League Two	25	4	3	1	1	0	2	0	31	5
Cambridge United (loan)	2023–24	League One	16	1	–		–		–		16	1
Southend United	2024–25	National League	39	5	2	0	–		4 (Note: One appearance in the FA Trophy, three appearances in the National League play-offs)	0	45	5
Maldon & Tiptree	2025–26	Isthmian League North Division	7	2	1	0	–		1 (Note: Appearance(s) in Essex Senior Cup)	1	9	3
Billericay Town	2025–26	Isthmian League Premier Division	11	3	–		–		2 (Note: Appearance(s) in Isthmian Premier League play-offs)	0	13	3
Career total			414	96	17	7	8	1	22	7	461	111

=== International ===
As of match played 29 December 2025

Appearances and goals by national team and year
National team	Year	Apps	Goals
Zimbabwe	2014	1	1
Zimbabwe	2017	2	0
Zimbabwe	2024	2	1
Zimbabwe	2025	3	0
Zimbabwe	Total	8	2

International goals

Scores and results list Zimbabwe's goal tally first.

No.	Date	Venue	Opponent	Score	Result	Competition
1.	16 November 2014	Stade Adrar, Agadir, Morocco	Morocco	1–0	1–2	Friendly
2.	23 March 2024	Bingu National Stadium, Lilongwe, Malawi	Zambia	1–2	2–2	2024 Four Nations Football Tournament

== Honours ==
Colchester United

- Football League Youth Alliance South East: 2013–14
- Football League Youth Alliance Cup: 2013–14

Leyton Orient

- National League: 2018–19
- FA Trophy runner-up: 2018–19

Zimbabwe

- 2024 Four Nations Football Tournament runner-up

Billericay Town

- Isthmian Premier League play-offs: 2026

Individual

- Leyton Orient Player of the Year: 2017–18
- National League Team of the Season: 2018–19
