= Wilberforce Ocran =

English footballer

Personal information
- Full name: Wilberforce Paa Kwesi Ocran
- Date of birth: 24 September 1999 (age 27)
- Place of birth: Kumasi, Ghana
- Position: Forward

Team information
- Current team: Brentwood Town

Youth career
- Watford
- Arsenal
- Leyton Orient
- –2016: Enfield Town
- 2016–2018: Barnsley
- 2018: Charlton Athletic

Senior career*
Years	Team	Apps	(Gls)
2018–2020	Charlton Athletic	0	(0)
2018	→ Cray Wanderers (loan)	3	(1)
2020	→ Brentwood Town (loan)	2	(0)
2020	Farnborough	1	(0)
2020–	Brentwood Town	2	(1)
- * Club domestic league appearances and goals as of 16:10, 26 November 2020 (UTC)

Wilberforce Paa Kwesi Ocran (born 24 September 1999) is an English professional footballer who plays for Brentwood Town.

== Club career ==
Prior a move to Charlton Athletic in May 2018, Ocran enjoyed spells at Watford, Arsenal, Leyton Orient, Enfield Town and Barnsley. On 10 November 2018, Ocran joined Isthmian League South East Division side, Cray Wanderers and went onto feature three times, scoring once before returning to Charlton at the end of the month.

On 13 August 2019, Ocran made his professional debut, replacing Sam Field in the 78th minute, during Charlton's home 0–0 draw with Forest Green Rovers in an EFL Cup first round tie, in which the visitors eventually claimed the victory on penalties, 5–3. During the latter stages of the 2019–20, prior to the COVID-19 pandemic, Ocran joined Isthmian League North Division side, Brentwood Town where he featured twice, failing to score. On 2 July 2020, it was confirmed that Ocran had left Charlton after his contract expired.

Prior to the 2020–21 campaign, Ocran made a move to Southern League Premier Division South side, Farnborough before returning to Brentwood Town in October.

== Personal life ==
Born in Ghana, Ocran grew up in north London.

== Career statistics ==
As of match played 17 October 2020.

Club	Season	League			FA Cup		League Cup		Other		Total	
Club	Season	Division	Apps	Goals	Apps	Goals	Apps	Goals	Apps	Goals	Apps	Goals
Charlton Athletic	2018–19	League One	0	0	0	0	0	0	0	0	0	0
Charlton Athletic	2019–20	Championship	0	0	0	0	1	0	—		1	0
Charlton Athletic	Total		0	0	0	0	1	0	0	0	1	0
Cray Wanderers (loan)	2018–19	Isthmian League South East Division	3	1	—		—		—		3	1
Brentwood Town (loan)	2019–20	Isthmian League North Division	2	0	—		—		—		2	0
Farnborough	2020–21	Southern League Premier Division South	1	0	1	0	—		0	0	2	0
Brentwood Town	2020–21	Isthmian League North Division	2	1	—		—		1 (Note: Appearance(s) in FA Trophy)	0	3	1
Career total			8	2	1	0	1	0	1	0	11	2
