= 2024 Four Nations Football Tournament =

International football tournament

Tournament details
- Host country: Malawi
- City: Lilongwe
- Dates: 23–26 March 2024
- Teams: 4 (from 1 confederation)
- Venue: 1 (in 1 host city)

Final positions
- Champions: Kenya
- Runners-up: Zimbabwe
- Third place: Zambia
- Fourth place: Malawi

Tournament statistics
- Matches played: 4
- Goals scored: 15 (3.75 per match)
- Top scorer(s): (Kenya) Michael Olunga (5 goals)

The 2024 Four Nations Football Tournament was an international association football friendly tournament organised by the Football Association of Malawi (FAM). It took place from 23 to 26 March 2024 at the Bingu National Stadium in Lilongwe and Kenya won the tournament.

== Venue ==
All matches will be held at the Bingu National Stadium in Lilongwe, Malawi.

Lilongwe	Lilongwe is located in Malawi
Bingu National Stadium	Lilongwe is located in Malawi
Capacity: 10,000	Lilongwe is located in Malawi

== Participants countries ==
The following four teams contested in the tournament. FIFA ranking as of 15 February 2024.

Country	Confederation	FIFA Ranking	Confederation Ranking
Kenya	CAF	111	26
Malawi (Host)	CAF	122	33
Zambia	CAF	87	18
Zimbabwe	CAF	124	34

== Knockout stage ==
The four teams competing against each other did not play in a group stage, but instead began in a round-robin semi-final.

=== Semi-finals ===
Semi-finals
23 March
Zambia	2 (5)
Zimbabwe	2 (6)
23 March
Malawi (H)	0
Kenya	4

Final
26 March
Zimbabwe	1
Kenya	3
Third place
26 March
Zambia	2
Malawi (H)	1

23 March 2024
14:00 CAT

Zambia	2–2	Zimbabwe
Sunzu 5'; Chama 24'	Report	Bonne 32'; Musona 45+2'
Penalties
Daka (penalty scored); Banda (penalty missed); Mphande (penalty scored); Chama (penalty scored); Mashata (penalty scored); Benedict Chepeshi (penalty scored); Sunzu (penalty missed)	5-6	Musona (penalty missed); Takwara (penalty scored); Lungwa (penalty missed); Kadewere (penalty scored); Munetsi (penalty scored); Rinomhota (penalty scored); Donovan (penalty scored); Msendami (penalty scored)

Bingu National Stadium, Lilongwe
23 March 2024
14:00 CAT

Malawi	0–4	Kenya
	Report	Olunga 1', 5' (pen.); Timbe 83'; Avire 90+3'

Bingu National Stadium, Lilongwe
Attendance: 27,000

=== Third place playoff ===
26 March 2024
14:00 CAT

Zambia	2–1	Malawi
Chama 16'; Daka 18'	Report	Chaziya 22'

Bingu National Stadium, Lilongwe

=== Final ===
26 March 2024
17:00 CAT

Zimbabwe	1–3	Kenya
Okumu 4' (o.g.)	Report	Olunga 45+1', 63', 87'

Bingu National Stadium, Lilongwe

== Statistics ==
=== Goalscorers ===
There have been 15 goals scored in 4 matches, for an average of 3.75 goals per match.

5 goals

- (Kenya) Michael Olunga

2 goals

- (Zambia) Clatous Chama

1 goal

- (Zimbabwe) Macauley Bonne
- (Zimbabwe) Walter Musona
- (Zambia) Stoppila Sunzu
- (Kenya) Ayub Timbe
- (Kenya) John Avire
- (Malawi) Lawrence Chaziya
