= John Avire =

Kenyan footballer (born 1997)

Personal information
- Date of birth: 12 March 1997 (age 29)
- Height: 1.89 m (6 ft 2 in)
- Position: Forward

Team information
- Current team: Porto Suez

Senior career*
Years	Team	Apps	(Gls)
2017	Kakamega Homeboyz	11	(0)
2018	Nakumatt	10	(2)
2018	Bandari	7	(0)
2019	Sofapaka		
2019–2020	Tanta	10	(1)
2019–2020	Aswan	9	(0)
2020	Coca-Cola FC al-Qāhira		
2020–2021	Misr Lel Makkasa	20	(0)
2022–	Porto Suez		

International career^{‡}
2019–	Kenya	12	(2)
- * Club domestic league appearances and goals as of 12 December 2024 ‡ National team caps and goals as of 12 December 2024 (UTC)

John Avire (born 12 March 1997) is a Kenyan professional footballer who plays as a forward for Egyptian Second Division B club Porto Suez and the Kenya national team.

== International ==
He made his Kenya national football team debut on 7 June 2019 in a friendly against Madagascar.

He was selected for the 2019 Africa Cup of Nations and 2024 Four Nations Football Tournament squads.

== Honours ==
Bandari

- Kenyan Premier League
  - Runners-up (1): 2018

Kenya

- Four Nations Football Tournament
  - Champions (1): 2024
