= Patrick Bauer (footballer) =

German footballer (born 1992)

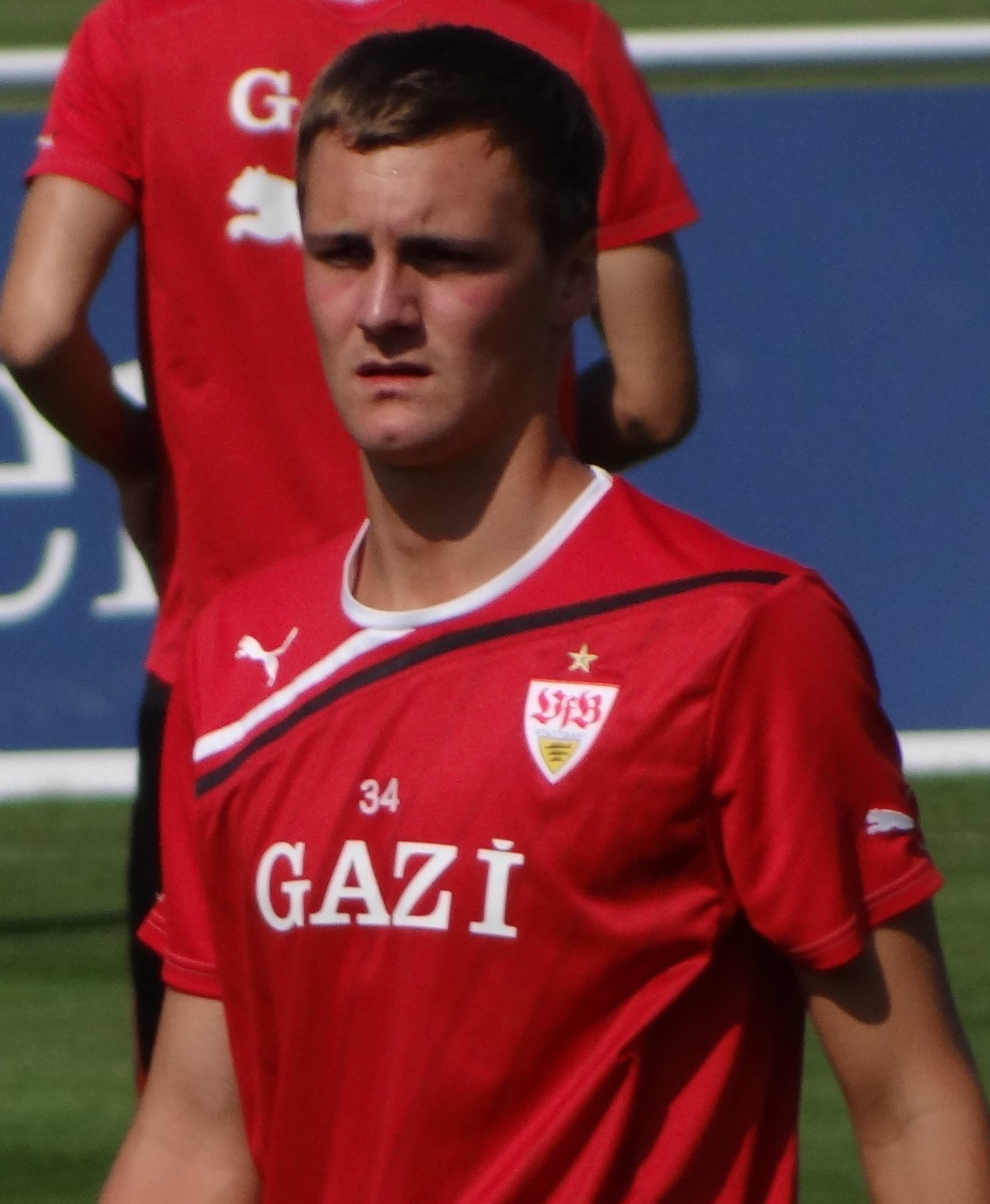
- Bauer training with VfB Stuttgart in 2011

Personal information
- Full name: Patrick Bauer
- Date of birth: 28 October 1992 (age 34)
- Place of birth: Backnang, Germany
- Height: 1.92 m (6 ft 4 in)
- Position: Centre back

Team information
- Current team: Cambridge United
- Number: 5

Youth career
- –2005: TSG Backnang
- 2005–2010: VfB Stuttgart

Senior career*
Years	Team	Apps	(Gls)
2010–2012	VfB Stuttgart II	7	(0)
2011–2013	VfB Stuttgart	0	(0)
2012–2013	→ Marítimo B (loan)	36	(5)
2013–2015	Marítimo B	22	(2)
2013–2015	Marítimo	45	(2)
2015–2019	Charlton Athletic	124	(8)
2019–2025	Preston North End	95	(7)
2025–2026	AFC Wimbledon	23	(0)
2026–	Cambridge United	3	(0)

International career^{‡}
2009	Germany U17	3	(0)
2009	Germany U18	5	(1)
2011	Germany U20	2	(1)
- * Club domestic league appearances and goals as of 08:26, 7 November 2026 (UTC) ‡ National team caps and goals as of 17:10, 12 May 2025 (UTC)

Patrick Bauer (born 28 October 1992) is a German professional footballer who plays as a centre back for EFL League One club Cambridge United.

== Club career ==
In May 2011 Bauer extended his contract with VfB Stuttgart until June 2015. On 29 July 2011, he had his debut for the first team of VfB Stuttgart in the first round of the 2011–12 DFB-Pokal against SV Wehen Wiesbaden.

On 17 August 2012, Bauer was loaned out to C.S. Marítimo until the end of the 2012–13 season. On 26 August 2012, he made his debut for C.S. Marítimo B in the Segunda Liga against Vitória S.C. B. Six days later, he scored his first goal in the Segunda Liga against Sporting B. On 24 July 2013, Bauer signed a three-year contract with Marítimo.

On 22 June 2015, Bauer became Charlton Athletic's first signing of the summer by putting pen to paper on a four-year contract with the Championship side. He made his Charlton Athletic debut against QPR on 8 August 2015. On 12 September, he scored his first goal for the club in a 1–1 draw with Rotherham United.

On 26 May 2019, Bauer scored the winning goal for Charlton in the 94th minute of the 2019 EFL League One play-off final against Sunderland at Wembley Stadium.

He was offered a new contract by Charlton at the end of the 2018–19 season, but instead decided to sign a three-year deal with Championship side Preston North End. On 17 January 2022, Bauer signed a new two-and-a-half-year contract with Preston.

On 9 May 2025, Preston announced that the player would be leaving in June when his contract expired.

On 20 August 2025, AFC Wimbledon announced that the player had signed a one-year contract.

On 3 July 2026, Cambridge United announced he agreed a one-year deal.

== International career ==
Bauer has been capped for Germany national youth teams ten times in total.

== Personal life ==
Bauer and his wife had their first child, a daughter, in May 2019.

== Career statistics ==
=== Club ===
As of match played 6 November 2026

Appearances and goals by club, season and competition
Club	Season	League			National Cup (Note: Includes DFB-Pokal, Taça de Portugal, FA Cup)		League Cup (Note: Includes Taça da Liga, EFL Cup)		Other		Total	
Club	Season	Division	Apps	Goals	Apps	Goals	Apps	Goals	Apps	Goals	Apps	Goals
VfB Stuttgart II	2010–11	3. Liga	2	0	3	0	—		–		5	0
VfB Stuttgart II	2011–12	3. Liga	5	0	0	0	—		–		5	0
VfB Stuttgart II	Total		7	0	3	0	—		–		10	0
Marítimo B (loan)	2012–13	Segunda Liga	36	5	–		–		–		36	5
Marítimo B	2013–14	Segunda Liga	20	2	–		–		–		20	2
Marítimo B	2014–15	Segunda Liga	2	0	–		–		–		2	0
Marítimo B	Total		22	2	–		–		–		22	2
Marítimo	2013–14	Primeira Liga	16	0	0	0	3	0	–		19	0
Marítimo	2014–15	Primeira Liga	29	2	3	0	4	0	–		36	2
Marítimo	Total		45	2	3	0	7	0	–		55	2
Charlton Athletic	2015–16	Championship	19	1	0	0	2	0	–		21	1
Charlton Athletic	2016–17	League One	36	4	2	0	0	0	0	0	38	4
Charlton Athletic	2017–18	League One	34	3	0	0	0	0	3 (Note: One appearance in EFL Trophy and two in League One play-offs)	0	37	3
Charlton Athletic	2018–19	League One	35	0	1	0	0	0	3 (Note: Appearances in League One play-offs)	1	39	1
Charlton Athletic	Total		124	8	3	0	2	0	6	1	135	9
Preston North End	2019–20	Championship	41	3	0	0	0	0	–		41	3
Preston North End	2020–21	Championship	12	1	0	0	3	1	–		15	2
Preston North End	2021–22	Championship	34	3	1	0	2	0	–		37	3
Preston North End	2022–23	Championship	6	0	0	0	2	0	–		8	0
Preston North End	2023–24	Championship	1	0	0	0	1	0	–		2	0
Preston North End	2024–25	Championship	1	0	0	0	1	0	–		2	0
Preston North End	Total		95	7	1	0	9	1	–		105	8
AFC Wimbledon	2025–26	League One	23	0	0	0	1	0	6 (Note: Appearances in EFL Trophy)	0	30	0
Cambridge United	2026–27	League One	3	0	1	0	1	0	2	0	7	0
Career total			355	24	11	0	20	1	14	1	400	26

== Honours ==
Charlton Athletic

- EFL League One play-offs: 2019
