= Dillon Phillips =

English footballer (born 1995)

- Phillips in 2026

Personal information
- Full name: Dillon Phillips
- Date of birth: 11 June 1995 (age 31)
- Place of birth: Hornchurch, England
- Position: Goalkeeper

Team information
- Current team: Hull City
- Number: 12

Youth career
- –2013: Charlton Athletic

Senior career*
Years	Team	Apps	(Gls)
2013–2020	Charlton Athletic	102	(0)
2013	→ Whitehawk (loan)	4	(0)
2015	→ Bishop's Stortford (loan)	4	(0)
2015–2016	→ Cheltenham Town (loan)	37	(0)
2020–2023	Cardiff City	36	(0)
2022–2023	→ KV Oostende (loan)	14	(0)
2023–2025	Rotherham United	39	(0)
2025–	Hull City	1	(0)
- * Club domestic league appearances and goals as of 08:08, 11 October 2026 (UTC)

Dillon Phillips (born 11 June 1995) is an English professional footballer who plays as a goalkeeper for Premier League club Hull City.

== Club career ==
Phillips signed for the Charlton Athletic academy when he was eight years old. He signed his first professional forms in the summer of 2013 at the age of 17 and joined Conference South side Whitehawk on a one-month loan on 8 November 2013. He returned to the Conference South on a one-month loan with Bishop's Stortford on 3 January 2015. He joined National League club Cheltenham Town on a six-month loan in July 2015. He started every game for the "Robins", keeping ten clean sheets in 26 games, and had his loan extended until the end of the 2015–16 season. He picked up an injury in March 2016, and missed the end-of-season run-in as Cheltenham secured promotion as National League champions. He signed a new two-year contract with Charlton in May 2016.

On 16 October 2020, Phillips joined Cardiff City for an undisclosed fee.

On 27 July 2022, Phillips joined Belgian First Division A side Oostende on a season-long loan deal. At the end of the 2022–23 season, he was released by Cardiff.

On 4 July 2023, Phillips signed for Rotherham United on a two-year deal.

On 16 June 2025, it was announced that Phillips would sign for EFL Championship club Hull City upon the expiration of his contract with Rotherham at the end of the same month. His new contract is set to last two years, with the option of an additional third available. He made his debut for the club in the First Round of the EFL Cup on 12 August in a 3–3 draw away at Wrexham.

== Personal life ==
His brother Noah Phillips is a professional goalkeeper for EFL League One side Leyton Orient.

== Career statistics ==
As of 25 August 2026

Appearances and goals by club, season and competition
Club	Season	League			FA Cup		EFL Cup		Other		Total	
Club	Season	Division	Apps	Goals	Apps	Goals	Apps	Goals	Apps	Goals	Apps	Goals
Charlton Athletic	2013–14	Championship	0	0	0	0	0	0	—		0	0
Charlton Athletic	2014–15	Championship	0	0	0	0	0	0	—		0	0
Charlton Athletic	2015–16	Championship	0	0	0	0	0	0	—		0	0
Charlton Athletic	2016–17	League One	8	0	2	0	0	0	3 (Note: Three appearances in the EFL Trophy)	0	13	0
Charlton Athletic	2017–18	League One	0	0	0	0	2	0	5 (Note: Five appearances in the EFL Trophy)	0	7	0
Charlton Athletic	2018–19	League One	27	0	3	0	1	0	4 (Note: One appearance in the EFL Trophy and three in the League One play-offs)	0	35	0
Charlton Athletic	2019–20	Championship	46	0	1	0	0	0	—		47	0
Charlton Athletic	Total		81	0	6	0	3	0	12	0	102	0
Whitehawk (loan)	2013–14	Conference South	4	0	0	0	—		0	0	4	0
Bishop's Stortford (loan)	2014–15	Conference South	4	0	0	0	—		0	0	4	0
Cheltenham Town (loan)	2015–16	National League	36	0	3	0	—		0	0	39	0
Cardiff City	2020–21	Championship	16	0	1	0	0	0	—		17	0
Cardiff City	2021–22	Championship	17	0	2	0	0	0	—		19	0
Cardiff City	2022–23	Championship	0	0	0	0	0	0	—		0	0
Cardiff City	Total		33	0	3	0	0	0	0	0	36	0
KV Oostende (loan)	2022–23	Belgian First Division A	12	0	2	0	—		0	0	14	0
Rotherham United	2023–24	Championship	2	0	0	0	2	0	—		4	0
Rotherham United	2024–25	League One	33	0	0	0	0	0	2 (Note: One appearance in the EFL Trophy)	0	35	0
Rotherham United	Total		35	0	0	0	2	0	2	0	39	0
Hull City	2025–26	Championship	1	0	2	0	1	0	—		4	0
Hull City	2026–27	Premier League	0	0	0	0	2	0	—		1	0
Hull City	Total		1	0	2	0	2	0	—		5	0
Career total			206	0	16	0	7	0	14	0	243	0

== Honours ==
Cheltenham Town

- National League: 2015–16

Charlton Athletic

- EFL League One play-offs: 2019

Hull City

- EFL Championship play-offs: 2026

Individual

- Charlton Athletic Player of the Year: 2019–20
