= Bingu National Stadium =

Stadium in Lilongwe, Malawi

- Bingu National Stadium
- Interactive map of Bingu National Stadium
- Full name: Bingu National Stadium
- Location: Lilongwe, Malawi
- Coordinates: 13.9438°S 33.7531°E
- Capacity: 41,100
- Surface: Bermuda grass
- Field size: 104 yd × 68 yd (95 m × 62 m)

Construction
- Groundbreaking: 11 July 2012; 14 years ago
- Built: 2012–2016
- Opened: 28 January 2017; 9 years ago
- Cost: 70 million USD
- Architect: Beijing Institute of Architectural Design
- General contractor: Anhui Foreign Economic Construction Group

Tenant
- Malawi national football team (2017–present)

Bingu National Stadium in Lilongwe is the national stadium of Malawi. It is used for football matches and also has an athletics track. It hosts the home games of the Malawi national football team. It holds 41,100 people. It is named after former Malawian president Bingu wa Mutharika. This stadium became Ethiopian Football Federation home arena. This follows Ethiopian Football Federation request to CAF to use BNS as their national stadium is banned to host international matches for lacking minimum requirements as per the CAF Club Licensing criteria.

It also hosted all four matches of the 2024 Four Nations Football Tournament in March 2024.

== Construction ==
The stadium was built with a US$70 million price tag and opened in 2017.

== See also ==
- List of football stadiums in Malawi
- List of African stadiums by capacity
- Lists of stadiums
