= Jason Pearce =

English footballer (born 1987)

Personal information
- Full name: Jason Daniel Pearce
- Date of birth: 6 December 1987 (age 38)
- Place of birth: Hillingdon, England
- Height: 6 ft 1 in (1.85 m)
- Position: Defender

Team information
- Current team: Charlton Athletic (senior professional development phase lead coach)

Youth career
- 2004–2006: Portsmouth

Senior career*
Years	Team	Apps	(Gls)
2006–2007	Portsmouth	0	(0)
2006	→ Bognor Regis Town (loan)	12	(1)
2007	→ Woking (loan)	18	(1)
2007–2011	AFC Bournemouth	162	(7)
2011–2012	Portsmouth	43	(2)
2012–2015	Leeds United	99	(2)
2015–2016	Wigan Athletic	47	(4)
2016–2022	Charlton Athletic	162	(6)
Total		543	(23)

Managerial career
- 2023: Charlton Athletic (caretaker)
- * Club domestic league appearances and goals as of 17:10, 10 May 2022 (UTC)

Jason Daniel Pearce (born 6 December 1987) is an English former professional footballer who played as a defender. He was previously the captain of Portsmouth, AFC Bournemouth, Leeds United and Charlton Athletic. He is senior professional development phase lead coach at Charlton Athletic.

== Playing career ==
=== Portsmouth ===
Having joined Portsmouth as an apprentice in 2004, Pearce rose through the ranks. His professionalism despite his tender years earned him his first pro-contract in June 2006. After a spell on loan at Bognor Regis Town during the first half of the 2006–07 season, he joined Woking on a one-month loan in January 2007.

=== AFC Bournemouth ===
On 9 August 2007, Pearce joined AFC Bournemouth on a two-year contract. He helped get Bournemouth promoted to League One from League Two during the 2009–10 season. On 4 January 2010, Pearce replaced Danny Hollands as first team captain, in a new-look structure that saw veteran striker Steve Fletcher become club captain.

During the 2010–11 season, Pearce led the club to the League One playoffs, however his involvement in the playoffs saw him sent off in extra time for a foul on Kevin Kilbane in the semi-final second leg against Huddersfield Town as Bournemouth were knocked out on penalties and as a result unable to gain a back to back promotion. Pearce received Bournemouth's Player of the Year Award for the 2010–11 season.

=== Return to Portsmouth ===
Pearce was sold back to his old club Portsmouth on a three-year contract for an undisclosed fee, reported to be in the region of £300,000, up to £600,000, on 24 June 2011. Pearce joined his new club alongside David Norris when the first team came back from absence on 1 July. After being suspended for the first three games of the season due to a red card in his last game for Bournemouth, Pearce made his debut on 16 August 2011, against Reading, playing as a centre-back. With Portsmouth in financial turmoil he was subject to a bid from Ipswich Town in January 2012, however he said he wanted to stay at Portsmouth under new manager Michael Appleton. When captain Liam Lawrence was loaned to Cardiff City, on 3 March 2012, Pearce was named as the new permanent captain of Portsmouth. He took over the captain's armband in the Championship match against Middlesbrough in a 3–1 loss which could have possibly been the club's last match in existence. This was too much for the 24-year-old captain who was reduced to tears at the end of the 90 minutes. At the end of the 2011–12 season, Portsmouth were relegated to League One, due to the financial problems at the club it was announced that Pearce would have to be sold to raise funds for the club. In April 2012, at the end of season awards, Pearce won seven out of the nine available supporters awards.

=== Leeds United ===
On 4 May 2012, Pearce signed for Leeds United for an undisclosed fee on a four-year contract, becoming the club's first signing of the summer transfer window. Leeds manager Neil Warnock revealed that he tried previously to sign him while he was at Queens Park Rangers and also tried sign him on loan in March, after he had joined Leeds. Following his transfer, Portsmouth administrator Trevor Birch defended the cut-price deal which saw him join Leeds as he explained that such measures are necessary to keep relegated Pompey afloat. Pearce made his competitive début for Leeds in the first game of the season against Shrewsbury Town in the League Cup on 11 August. Pearce made his league debut for Leeds their 1–0 victory against Wolverhampton Wanderers. He put in an impressive performance and received the man of the match award. With regular captain Lee Peltier out injured, Pearce was named captain for Leeds' 2–1 League Cup victory against Premiership side Everton on 25 September. Pearce also picked up a head injury in the same game which required stitches. Pearce received a straight red card against Watford on 10 November, the red card would result in a three-match ban. After his red card, Leeds signed Alan Tate to cover Pearce's absence, however due to Tate's form, Pearce lost his place in the side upon return from suspension. Following the arrival of Brian McDermott as manager and initially an injury to captain Lee Peltier. Pearce finished the season as the regular central defensive partner to Tom Lees.

He scored his first goal for the club on 5 October, in a 3–1 defeat against Derby County. Pearce was awarded the man of the match award against Queens Park Rangers on 1 March 2014 in a 1–1 draw, up to this point in the season, Pearce had played every single minute of the 2013/14 season for Leeds with a string of impressive individual performances. Pearce, missed the following game against Bolton Wanderers on 8 March as his partner gave birth to their first child on 7 March. On 3 May, At the club's annual awards ceremony, Pearce finished runner up to winner Ross McCormack in the Fans Player of the Year award.

After the sale of club captain Ross McCormack, on 9 August 2014, Pearce was named as the new club Captain against Millwall. In November 2014, Pearce was replaced as captain by Stephen Warnock, with Warnock replaced as captain by Liam Cooper following his sale to Derby County in January 2015.

=== Wigan Athletic ===
On 30 January 2015, Pearce signed for Wigan Athletic for an undisclosed fee, reported to be £300,000, on a "long-term" contract.

=== Charlton Athletic ===
On 4 August 2016, Pearce joined League One club Charlton Athletic on an undisclosed fee. He scored his first goal for Charlton in a 3–0 win over Gillingham on 17 April 2017. At the end of his debut season with the club, he signed a new three-year contract with the club.

On 11 June 2019, Pearce signed a new two-year contract with Charlton.

On 22 June 2021, Pearce extended his contract at the club for a further year.

On 10 May 2022, it was confirmed that Pearce would leave Charlton Athletic as a player when his contract expired. He was, however, offered a contract in a non-playing capacity. On 17 June 2022, it was confirmed that Pearce had retired and taken up the role of U18s Academy Coach.

== Management career ==
=== Charlton Athletic ===
On 27 August 2023, it was announced that Pearce would take interim charge of the Charlton Athletic first-team while the club looked for a new manager to replace Dean Holden.

On 24 January 2024, it was announced that Pearce would be interim assistant head coach to Curtis Fleming following the departure of Michael Appleton.

== Career statistics ==
=== As a player ===
Appearances and goals by club, season and competition
Club	Season	League			FA Cup		League Cup		Other		Total	
Club	Season	Division	Apps	Goals	Apps	Goals	Apps	Goals	Apps	Goals	Apps	Goals
Portsmouth	2006–07	Premier League	0	0	0	0	0	0	–	–	0	0
Bognor Regis (loan)	2006–07	Conference South	12	1	2	0	–	–	1 (Note: One appearance in the FA Trophy)	0	15	1
Woking (loan)	2006–07	Conference Premier	18	1	0	0	–	–	0	0	18	1
AFC Bournemouth	2007–08	League One	33	1	3	0	1	0	1 (Note: One appearance in the Football League Trophy)	0	38	1
AFC Bournemouth	2008–09	League Two	44	2	3	1	1	0	3 (Note: Three appearances in the Football League Trophy)	0	51	3
AFC Bournemouth	2009–10	League Two	39	1	2	0	1	0	0	0	42	1
AFC Bournemouth	2010–11	League One	46	3	2	0	1	0	3 (Note: One appearance in the Football League Trophy and two in the League One play-offs)	0	52	3
AFC Bournemouth	Total		162	7	10	1	4	0	7	0	183	8
Portsmouth	2011–12	Championship	43	2	1	0	0	0	–	–	44	2
Leeds United	2012–13	Championship	33	0	3	0	5	0	–	–	41	0
Leeds United	2013–14	Championship	45	2	1	0	3	0	–	–	49	2
Leeds United	2014–15	Championship	21	0	0	0	2	0	–	–	23	0
Leeds United	Total		99	2	4	0	10	0	0	0	113	2
Wigan Athletic	2014–15	Championship	16	2	0	0	–	–	–	–	16	2
Wigan Athletic	2015–16	League One	31	2	0	0	0	0	2 (Note: Two appearances in the Football League Trophy)	0	33	2
Wigan Athletic	Total		47	4	0	0	0	0	2	0	49	4
Charlton Athletic	2016–17	League One	23	1	1	0	0	0	0	0	24	1
Charlton Athletic	2017–18	League One	25	2	0	0	1	0	3 (Note: One appearance in the EFL Trophy and two in the League One play-offs)	0	29	2
Charlton Athletic	2018–19	League One	26	2	0	0	0	0	2 (Note: Two appearances in the League One play-offs)	0	28	2
Charlton Athletic	2019–20	Championship	39	1	0	0	0	0	–	–	39	1
Charlton Athletic	2020–21	League One	26	0	0	0	0	0	1 (Note: One appearance in the EFL Trophy)	0	27	0
Charlton Athletic	2021–22	League One	23	0	1	0	1	0	3 (Note: Three appearances and one goal in the EFL Trophy)	1	28	1
Charlton Athletic	Total		162	6	2	0	2	0	9	1	175	7
Career total			543	23	19	1	16	0	19	1	597	25

=== As a manager ===
As of match played 5 September 2023

Managerial record by team and tenure
Team	From	To	Record				
Team	From	To	P	W	D	L	Win %
Charlton Athletic (caretaker)	27 August 2023	8 September 2023	2	1	0	1	50.0
Total			2	1	0	1	50.0

== Honours ==
Wigan Athletic

- Football League One: 2015–16

Charlton Athletic

- EFL League One play-offs: 2019

Individual

- AFC Bournemouth Player of the Year: 2010–11
- Portsmouth Player of the Year: 2011–12
