= 1992–93 Charlton Athletic F.C. season =

Charlton Athletic
1992–93 season
- Chairman: Roger Alwen
- Manager: Alan Curbishley; Steve Gritt
- Stadium: Boleyn Ground (until 5 December); The Valley (from 5 December)
- First Division: 12th
- FA Cup: Third round
- League Cup: Second round
- Top goalscorer: League: Pardew (9); All: Pardew (10)
- Average home league attendance: 7,005
Home colours	Away colours	Third colours

During the 1992–93 English football season, Charlton Athletic competed in the Football League First Division.

== Season summary ==
In the 1992–93 campaign, Charlton began the season promisingly and looked good bets for promotion in the new Division One (the new name of the old Second Division following the formation of the Premier League). However, the club was forced to sell players such as Rob Lee to help pay for a return to The Valley, which eventually happened in December 1992.

There was a tragedy at the club late on in the season when defender Tommy Caton, who had been out of action due to injury since January 1991, announced his retirement from playing on medical advice in March 1993 having failed to recover full fitness, and he died suddenly at the end of the following month at the age of 30.

== Kit ==
Charlton's kit was manufactured by Ribero with no front of shirt sponsor.

== Final league table ==
Pos	Team	Pld	W	D	L	GF	GA	GD	Pts
10	Peterborough United	46	16	14	16	55	63	−8	62
11	Wolverhampton Wanderers	46	16	13	17	57	56	+1	61
12	Charlton Athletic	46	16	13	17	49	46	+3	61
13	Barnsley	46	17	9	20	56	60	−4	60
14	Oxford United	46	14	14	18	53	56	−3	56

Source: rsssf.com
Rules for classification: 1) Points; 2) Goals scored; 3) Goal difference

== Results ==
Charlton Athletic's score comes first

=== Legend ===
Win	Draw	Loss

=== Football League First Division ===
Date	Opponent	Venue	Result	Attendance	Scorers
15 August 1992	Grimsby Town	H	3–1	4,823	Nelson, Leaburn, Dyer
18 August 1992	Cambridge United	A	1–0	5,094	Pardew
22 August 1992	West Ham United	A	1–0	17,054	Pardew
25 August 1992	Bristol Rovers	H	4–1	4,719	Lee, Dyer, Pardew (2, 1 pen)
29 August 1992	Luton Town	H	0–0	6,291	
5 September 1992	Sunderland	A	2–0	17,954	Butcher (own goal), Bennett (own goal)
12 September 1992	Cambridge United	H	0–0	5,836	
18 September 1992	Tranmere Rovers	A	0–0	6,055	
26 September 1992	Swindon Town	H	2–0	6,742	Minto, Grant
3 October 1992	Southend United	H	1–1	6,399	Grant
10 October 1992	Bristol City	A	1–2	9,282	Leaburn
18 October 1992	Millwall	H	0–2	7,527	
24 October 1992	Derby County	A	3–4	15,482	Pardew (2), Robinson
1 November 1992	Birmingham City	H	0–0	4,445	
4 November 1992	Leicester City	H	2–0	4,213	Nelson (2)
7 November 1992	Brentford	A	0–2	9,354	
14 November 1992	Newcastle United	H	1–3	12,945	Nelson
22 November 1992	Wolverhampton Wanderers	A	1–2	10,593	Bumstead
28 November 1992	Barnsley	A	0–1	5,851	
5 December 1992	Portsmouth	H	1–0	8,337	Walsh
13 December 1992	Watford	A	1–1	6,475	Robinson
19 December 1992	Oxford United	H	1–1	7,287	Bumstead
26 December 1992	West Ham United	H	1–1	8,337	Bumstead
28 December 1992	Peterborough United	A	1–1	8,931	Garland
9 January 1993	Tranmere Rovers	H	2–2	8,337	Balmer, Leaburn
16 January 1993	Swindon Town	A	2–2	8,605	Nelson, Dyer
27 January 1993	Bristol Rovers	A	2–0	5,096	Pardew (2)
30 January 1993	Notts County	H	2–1	8,337	Dyer, Pardew (pen)
6 February 1993	Grimsby Town	A	0–1	5,403	
13 February 1993	Sunderland	H	0–1	8,151	
20 February 1993	Luton Town	A	0–1	8,443	
27 February 1993	Bristol City	H	2–1	7,351	Gorman, Gatting
6 March 1993	Southend United	A	2–0	5,804	Webster, Leaburn
10 March 1993	Newcastle United	A	2–2	29,582	Nelson, Leaburn
13 March 1993	Brentford	H	1–0	7,194	Pitcher
20 March 1993	Portsmouth	A	0–1	12,854	
23 March 1993	Wolverhampton Wanderers	H	0–1	7,852	
27 March 1993	Leicester City	A	1–3	17,290	Dyer
3 April 1993	Barnsley	H	0–0	6,154	
6 April 1993	Watford	H	3–1	6,375	Webster, Balmer, Gatting
10 April 1993	Notts County	A	0–2	6,202	
12 April 1993	Peterborough United	H	0–1	6,721	
17 April 1993	Oxford United	A	1–0	5,121	Dyer
24 April 1993	Millwall	A	0–1	10,159	
1 May 1993	Derby County	H	2–1	7,802	Pitcher, Gorman
8 May 1993	Birmingham City	A	0–1	22,234	

=== FA Cup ===
Round	Date	Opponent	Venue	Result	Attendance	Goalscorers
R3	2 January 1993	Leeds United	A	1–1	21,287	Nelson
R3R	23 January 1993	Leeds United	H	1–3	8,337	Pitcher (pen)

=== League Cup ===
Round	Date	Opponent	Venue	Result	Attendance	Goalscorers
R2 First Leg	22 September 1992	Bury	A	0–0	2,393	
R2 Second Leg	7 October 1992	Bury	H	0–1 (lost 0–1 on agg)	2,083	

=== Anglo-Italian Cup ===
Round	Date	Opponent	Venue	Result	Attendance	Goalscorers
PR Group 6	2 September 1992	Millwall	A	2–1	3,975	Barness, Pardew
PR Group 6	15 September 1992	Portsmouth	H	1–3	1,853	Leaburn

== First-team squad ==
Squad at end of season

Note: Flags indicate national team as defined under FIFA eligibility rules; some limited exceptions apply. Players may hold more than one non-FIFA nationality.

Pos.	Nation	Player
GK	ENG	Bob Bolder
DF	ENG	Steve Brown
DF	SCO	Stuart Balmer
DF	ENG	Simon Webster
DF	ENG	Scott Minto
MF	WAL	John Robinson (Note: Robinson was born in Bulawayo, Rhodesia (now Zimbabwe), but also qualified to represent Wales internationally and represented them at U-21 level before making his international debut for Wales in 1995.)
MF	SCO	Colin Walsh
MF	ENG	Darren Pitcher
MF	ENG	Alan Pardew
FW	ENG	Carl Leaburn
FW	ENG	Garry Nelson
FW	GHA	Kim Grant
DF	ENG	Steve Gatting
MF	ENG	Peter Garland
DF	ENG	Alex Dyer
GK	ENG	Mike Salmon

Pos.	Nation	Player
FW	ENG	Paul Gorman
MF	ENG	Steve Gritt (player-manager)
MF	ENG	Alan Curbishley (player-manager)
MF	ENG	John Bumstead
MF	ENG	Paul Bacon
MF	ENG	Rob Lee
DF	ENG	Anthony Barness
MF	ENG	Scott Houghton (on loan from Tottenham Hotspur)
FW	IRL	Lee Power (Note: Power was born in Lewisham, England, but also qualified to represent the Republic of Ireland internationally and represented them at U-21 and B level.) (on loan from Norwich City)
DF	ENG	Paul Sturgess
MF	ENG	Paul Linger
DF	ENG	Linvoy Primus
MF	ENG	Danny Warden
DF	ENG	Jermaine Darlington
GK	ENG	Lee Harrison
