= 1991–92 Charlton Athletic F.C. season =

Charlton Athletic
1991–92 season
- Chairman: Roger Alwen
- Manager: Alan Curbishley; Steve Gritt (player-managers)
- Stadium: Upton Park
- Second Division: 7th
- FA Cup: Fourth round
- League Cup: Second round
- Full Members Cup: First round
- Top goalscorer: League: Lee (12); All: Leaburn (14)
- Average home league attendance: 6,786

During the 1991–92 English football season, Charlton Athletic F.C. competed in the Football League Second Division.

== Season summary ==
In the 1991–92 season, Charlton started the campaign brilliantly and by 23 October, the Addicks were level on points with Middlesbrough at the top of the table after 7 wins in their last 9 league games which included 5 consecutive victories, but their form afterwards took a dip and with only 2 wins from their next 13 league matches, saw them slip to 10th place despite being only 5 points from the play-off positions. They also went on a 10-game unbeaten run towards the end of the season and by 25 April, Charlton sat in the final play-off position and it seemed the Addicks were going to finish in the play-offs but defeats in their final 2 league games against Tranmere and Bristol Rovers, saw eventual play-off winners Blackburn pip them to the final play-off place.

== Final league table ==
Pos	Team	Pld	W	D	L	GF	GA	GD	Pts	Qualification or relegation
5	Cambridge United	46	19	17	10	65	47	+18	74	Qualification for the Second Division play-offs
6	Blackburn Rovers (O, P)	46	21	11	14	70	53	+17	74	Qualification for the Second Division play-offs
7	Charlton Athletic	46	20	11	15	54	48	+6	71	Qualification for the First Division (Note: From the 1992–93 season, the first tier became the Premier League, the second tier - then known as the Second Division - was renamed to the First Division, and the third tier - then known as the Third Division - was renamed to the Second Division.)
8	Swindon Town	46	18	15	13	69	55	+14	69	Qualification for the First Division
9	Portsmouth	46	19	12	15	65	51	+14	69	Qualification for the First Division

Rules for classification: 1) Points; 2) Goal difference; 3) Goals scored
(O) Play-off winners; (P) Promoted

== Results ==
Charlton Athletic's score comes first

=== Legend ===
Win	Draw	Loss

=== Football League Second Division ===
Date	Opponent	Venue	Result	Attendance	Scorers
18 August 1991	Newcastle United	H	2–1	9,322	Lee, Leaburn
24 August 1991	Wolverhampton Wanderers	A	1–1	16,309	Lee
1 September 1991	Derby County	H	0–2	6,602	
3 September 1991	Tranmere Rovers	A	2–2	7,609	Webster, Lee
7 September 1991	Plymouth Argyle	A	2–0	5,602	Pitcher (pen), Nelson
14 September 1991	Portsmouth	H	3–0	5,727	Nelson, Lee (2)
17 September 1991	Sunderland	H	1–4	5,807	Webster
21 September 1991	Watford	A	0–2	8,459	
28 September 1991	Port Vale	H	2–0	4,049	Nelson, Leaburn
5 October 1991	Leicester City	A	2–0	11,467	Nelson, Dyer
12 October 1991	Bristol Rovers	H	1–0	5,685	Leaburn
19 October 1991	Brighton & Hove Albion	H	2–0	5,598	Nelson, Walsh
23 October 1991	Oxford United	A	2–1	4,069	Pitcher, Lee
26 October 1991	Southend United	A	1–1	7,320	Leaburn
30 October 1991	Ipswich Town	H	1–1	6,939	Gatting
2 November 1991	Grimsby Town	A	0–1	4,743	
6 November 1991	Swindon Town	H	0–0	5,398	
9 November 1991	Blackburn Rovers	H	0–2	7,114	
16 November 1991	Middlesbrough	A	0–2	13,093	
23 November 1991	Cambridge United	H	1–2	6,350	Gorman
30 November 1991	Bristol City	A	2–0	9,123	Pardew, Gorman
7 December 1991	Barnsley	H	1–1	4,581	Pardew (pen)
26 December 1991	Ipswich Town	A	0–2	13,826	
28 December 1991	Derby County	A	2–1	14,367	Leaburn, Nelson
8 January 1992	Oxford United	H	2–2	4,101	Leaburn, Lee
15 January 1992	Wolverhampton Wanderers	H	0–2	5,703	
18 January 1992	Newcastle United	A	4–3	15,663	Barness, Walsh (2), O'Brien (own goal)
1 February 1992	Brighton & Hove Albion	A	2–1	8,870	Gorman, Lee
8 February 1992	Southend United	H	2–0	9,724	Webster, Leaburn
15 February 1992	Cambridge United	A	0–1	6,472	
22 February 1992	Bristol City	H	2–1	5,900	Walsh, Webster
26 February 1992	Millwall	A	0–1	12,882	
29 February 1992	Barnsley	A	0–1	6,050	
3 March 1992	Grimsby Town	H	1–3	3,658	Leaburn
7 March 1992	Millwall	H	1–0	8,177	Hendry
10 March 1992	Swindon Town	A	2–1	7,196	Leaburn, Webster
21 March 1992	Blackburn Rovers	A	2–0	14,844	Lee, Leaburn
28 March 1992	Middlesbrough	H	0–0	8,250	
31 March 1992	Portsmouth	A	2–1	14,561	Leaburn, Whyte
4 April 1992	Plymouth Argyle	H	0–0	6,787	
11 April 1992	Sunderland	A	2–1	21,326	Lee, Minto
18 April 1992	Watford	H	1–1	7,477	Lee
21 April 1992	Port Vale	A	1–1	8,461	Gritt
25 April 1992	Leicester City	H	2–0	15,537	Lee, Whyte
28 April 1992	Tranmere Rovers	H	0–1	7,645	
2 May 1992	Bristol Rovers	A	0–1	7,630	

=== FA Cup ===
Round	Date	Opponent	Venue	Result	Attendance	Goalscorers
R3	5 January 1992	Barnet	H	3–1	9,618	Gatting, Leaburn, Grant
R4	26 January 1992	Sheffield United	H	0–0	9,864	
R4R	5 February 1992	Sheffield United	A	1–3	11,428	Gatting

=== League Cup ===
Round	Date	Opponent	Venue	Result	Attendance	Goalscorers
R1 1st Leg	21 August 1991	Fulham	H	4–2	3,027	Leaburn, Minto, Walsh, Peake
R1 2nd Leg	27 August 1991	Fulham	A	1–1 (won 5–3 on agg)	3,563	Leaburn
R2 1st Leg	25 September 1991	Norwich City	H	0–2	2,886	
R2 2nd Leg	9 October 1991	Norwich City	A	0–3 (lost 0–5 on agg)	5,507	

=== Full Members Cup ===
Round	Date	Opponent	Venue	Result	Attendance	Goalscorers
SR1	2 October 1991	Cambridge United	A	1–1 (lost 2–4 on pens)	3,168	Gorman

== Squad ==
Note: Flags indicate national team as defined under FIFA eligibility rules; some limited exceptions apply. Players may hold more than one non-FIFA nationality.

Pos.	Nation	Player
GK	ENG	Bob Bolder
GK	ENG	Lee Harrison
GK	ENG	Mike Salmon
DF	SCO	Stuart Balmer
DF	ENG	Anthony Barness
DF	ENG	Steve Brown
DF	ENG	Alex Dyer
DF	ENG	Steve Gatting
DF	ENG	Scott Minto
DF	ENG	Simon Webster
DF	ENG	Chris Wilder (on loan from Sheffield United)
MF	ENG	Paul Bacon
MF	ENG	John Bumstead
MF	ENG	Alan Curbishley

Pos.	Nation	Player
MF	ENG	Steve Gritt
MF	ENG	Rob Lee
MF	ENG	Alan Pardew
MF	ENG	Andy Peake
MF	ENG	Darren Pitcher
MF	ENG	Mark Tivey
MF	SCO	Colin Walsh
FW	ENG	Carl Leaburn
FW	ENG	Paul Gorman
FW	GHA	Kim Grant
FW	SCO	John Hendry (on loan from Tottenham Hotspur)
FW	ENG	Garry Nelson
FW	SLE	Leroy Rosenior (on loan from West Ham United)
FW	ENG	David Whyte (on loan from Crystal Palace)
