= 1988–89 Charlton Athletic F.C. season =

Charlton Athletic
1988–89 season
- Manager: Lennie Lawrence
- Stadium: Selhurst Park
- First Division: 14th
- FA Cup: Fifth round
- League Cup: Third round
Home colours	Away colours	Third colours

During the 1988–89 English football season, Charlton Athletic F.C. competed in the Football League First Division.

== Kit ==
Charlton's kit was manufactured by Admiral and sponsored by The Woolwich.

== Squad ==
Note: Flags indicate national team as defined under FIFA eligibility rules; some limited exceptions apply. Players may hold more than one non-FIFA nationality.

Pos.	Nation	Player
GK	ENG	Bob Bolder
GK	IRL	Jim McDonagh
DF	ENG	Tommy Caton
DF	ENG	Matt Elliott
DF	ENG	John Humphrey
DF	ENG	Scott Minto
DF	ENG	Colin Pates
DF	ENG	Darren Pitcher
DF	ENG	Peter Shirtliff
DF	SCO	Mark Reid
MF	ENG	Mickey Bennett
MF	ENG	Peter Evans

Pos.	Nation	Player
MF	ENG	Steve Gritt
MF	ENG	Rob Lee
MF	ENG	Stephen MacKenzie
MF	ENG	Paul Mortimer
MF	ENG	Andy Peake
MF	SCO	Colin Walsh
FW	ENG	Garth Crooks
FW	ENG	Carl Leaburn
FW	ENG	Mark Stuart
FW	ENG	Paul Williams
FW	WAL	Andy Jones

=== Left club during season ===
Note: Flags indicate national team as defined under FIFA eligibility rules; some limited exceptions apply. Players may hold more than one non-FIFA nationality.

Pos.	Nation	Player
MF	NIR	David Campbell (to Bradford City)

== Standings ==
Pos	Team	Pld	W	D	L	GF	GA	GD	Pts
12	Wimbledon	38	14	9	15	50	46	+4	51
13	Southampton	38	10	15	13	52	66	−14	45
14	Charlton Athletic	38	10	12	16	44	58	−14	42
15	Sheffield Wednesday	38	10	12	16	34	51	−17	42
16	Luton Town	38	10	11	17	42	52	−10	41

Source: World Football
Rules for classification: 1) Points; 2) Goal difference; 3) Goals scored
