= 1989–90 Charlton Athletic F.C. season =

Charlton Athletic F.C.
1989–90 season
- Manager: Lennie Lawrence
- Football League First Division: 19th Relegated
- FA Cup: Fourth Round
- League Cup: Third Round
- Full Members' Cup: Third Round
Home colours	Away colours	Third colours

This article documents the 1989–90 season of London football club Charlton Athletic F.C.

== League table ==
Pos	Team	Pld	W	D	L	GF	GA	GD	Pts	Qualification or relegation
16	Derby County	38	13	7	18	43	40	+3	46	
17	Luton Town	38	10	13	15	43	57	−14	43	
18	Sheffield Wednesday (R)	38	11	10	17	35	51	−16	43	Relegation to the Second Division
19	Charlton Athletic (R)	38	7	9	22	31	57	−26	30	Relegation to the Second Division
20	Millwall (R)	38	5	11	22	39	65	−26	26	Relegation to the Second Division

Source: World Football
Rules for classification: 1) Points; 2) Goal difference; 3) Goals scored
(R) Relegated

== Results ==
=== First Division ===
19 August 1989 1	Charlton Athletic	0–0	Derby County	London
				Stadium: Selhurst Park; Attendance: 8,543

22 August 1989 2	Millwall	2–2	Charlton Athletic	London
				Stadium: The Den; Attendance: 14,806

26 August 1989 3	Aston Villa	1–1	Charlton Athletic	Birmingham
				Stadium: Villa Park; Attendance: 15,236

29 August 1989 4	Charlton Athletic	3–0	Chelsea	London
				Stadium: Selhurst Park; Attendance: 17,221

9 September 1989 5	Luton Town	1–0	Charlton Athletic	Luton
				Stadium: Kenilworth Road; Attendance: 8,859

16 September 1989 6	Charlton Athletic	0–1	Everton	London
				Stadium: Selhurst Park; Attendance: 11,491

23 September 1989 7	Arsenal	1–0	Charlton Athletic	London
				Stadium: Highbury; Attendance: 34,583

30 September 1989 8	Nottingham Forest	2–0	Charlton Athletic	Nottingham
				Stadium: City Ground; Attendance: 18,189

14 October 1989 9	Charlton Athletic	1–3	Tottenham Hotspur	London
				Stadium: Selhurst Park; Attendance: 17,692

21 October 1989 10	Queens Park Rangers	0–1	Charlton Athletic	London
				Stadium: Loftus Road; Attendance: 10,608

28 October 1989 11	Charlton Athletic	1–1	Coventry City	London
				Stadium: Selhurst Park; Attendance: 6,149

4 November 1989 12	Charlton Athletic	2–0	Manchester United	London
				Stadium: Selhurst Park; Attendance: 16,065

11 November 1989 13	Sheffield Wednesday	3–0	Charlton Athletic	Sheffield
				Stadium: Hillsborough; Attendance: 16,740

18 November 1989 14	Norwich City	0–0	Charlton Athletic	Norwich
				Stadium: Carrow Road; Attendance: 16,084

25 November 1989 15	Charlton Athletic	1–1	Manchester City	London
				Stadium: Selhurst Park; Attendance: 8,852

2 December 1989 16	Derby County	2–0	Charlton Athletic	Derby
				Stadium: Baseball Ground; Attendance: 14,590

9 December 1989 17	Charlton Athletic	1–1	Millwall	London
				Stadium: Selhurst Park; Attendance: 11,017

16 December 1989 18	Charlton Athletic	1–2	Crystal Palace	London
				Stadium: Selhurst Park; Attendance: 15,763

26 December 1989 19	Wimbledon	3–1	Charlton Athletic	London
				Stadium: Plough Lane; Attendance: 5,988

30 December 1989 20	Liverpool	1–0	Charlton Athletic	Liverpool
				Stadium: Anfield; Attendance: 36,678

1 January 1990 21	Charlton Athletic	2–4	Southampton	London
				Stadium: Selhurst Park; Attendance: 7,614

13 January 1990 22	Charlton Athletic	0–2	Aston Villa	London
				Stadium: Selhurst Park; Attendance: 10,513

20 January 1990 23	Chelsea	3–1	Charlton Athletic	London
				Stadium: Stamford Bridge; Attendance: 15,667

10 February 1990 24	Everton	2–1	Charlton Athletic	Liverpool
				Stadium: Goodison Park; Attendance: 21,442

19 February 1990 25	Charlton Athletic	2–0	Luton Town	London
				Stadium: Selhurst Park; Attendance: 6,201

24 February 1990 26	Manchester City	1–2	Charlton Athletic	Manchester
				Stadium: Maine Road; Attendance: 24,030

27 February 1990 27	Charlton Athletic	0–0	Arsenal	London
				Stadium: Selhurst Park; Attendance: 17,504

3 March 1990 28	Charlton Athletic	0–1	Norwich City	London
				Stadium: Selhurst Park; Attendance: 7,918

10 March 1990 29	Tottenham Hotspur	3–0	Charlton Athletic	London
				Stadium: White Hart Lane; Attendance: 21,204

17 March 1990 30	Charlton Athletic	1–1	Nottingham Forest	London
				Stadium: Selhurst Park; Attendance: 6,690

24 March 1990 31	Coventry City	1–2	Charlton Athletic	Coventry
				Stadium: Highfield Road; Attendance: 9,997

31 March 1990 32	Charlton Athletic	1–0	Queens Park Rangers	London
				Stadium: Selhurst Park; Attendance: 8,768

11 April 1990 33	Charlton Athletic	0–4	Liverpool	London
				Stadium: Selhurst Park; Attendance: 13,982

14 April 1990 34	Southampton	3–2	Charlton Athletic	Southampton
				Stadium: The Dell; Attendance: 15,275

17 April 1990 35	Charlton Athletic	1–2	Wimbledon	London
				Stadium: Selhurst Park; Attendance: 5,679

21 April 1990 36	Crystal Palace	2–0	Charlton Athletic	London
				Stadium: Selhurst Park; Attendance: 15,276

28 April 1990 37	Charlton Athletic	1–2	Sheffield Wednesday	London
				Stadium: Selhurst Park; Attendance: 7,029

5 May 1990 38	Manchester United	1–0	Charlton Athletic	Manchester
				Stadium: Old Trafford; Attendance: 35,389

=== FA Cup ===
7 January 1990 Round 3	Charlton Athletic	1–1	Bradford City	London
				Stadium: Selhurst Park

10 January 1990 Round 3	Bradford City	0–3	Charlton Athletic	Bradford
				Stadium: Valley Parade

27 January 1990 Round 4	West Bromwich Albion	1–0	Charlton Athletic	Birmingham
				Stadium: The Hawthorns

=== League Cup ===
20 September 1989 Round 2 Leg 1	Charlton Athletic	3–1	Hereford United	London
				Stadium: Selhurst Park; Attendance: 3,618

4 October 1989 Round 2 Leg 2	Hereford United	0–1 (1–4 agg.)	Charlton Athletic	Hereford
				Stadium: Edgar Street; Attendance: 4,777

24 October 1989 Round 3	Southampton	1–0	Charlton Athletic	Southampton
				Stadium: The Dell; Attendance: 13,590

=== Football League Trophy ===
14 November 1989 Southern Section Round 2	Charlton Athletic	2–1	Leicester City	London
				Stadium: Selhurst Park; Attendance: 1,565

19 December 1989 Round 3	Crystal Palace	2–0	Charlton Athletic	London
				Stadium: Selhurst Park; Attendance: 6,621

== Kit ==
Charlton's kit was manufactured by Admiral and sponsored by The Woolwich.

== Squad ==
Note: Flags indicate national team as defined under FIFA eligibility rules; some limited exceptions apply. Players may hold more than one non-FIFA nationality.

Pos.	Nation	Player
GK	ENG	Bob Bolder
DF	ENG	Tommy Caton
DF	ENG	John Humphrey
DF	ENG	Colin Pates
DF	ENG	Scott Minto
DF	SCO	Mark Reid
MF	ENG	Rob Lee
MF	ENG	Steve MacKenzie
MF	SCO	Joe McLaughlin
MF	ENG	Paul Mortimer
MF	ENG	Mickey Bennett
MF	ENG	Andy Peake

Pos.	Nation	Player
MF	SCO	Colin Walsh
MF	ENG	Steve Gritt
MF	GHA	Kenny Achampong
FW	WAL	Andy Jones
FW	ENG	Paul Williams
FW	ENG	Garth Crooks
FW	ENG	Miguel de Souza
FW	SCO	Iain Ferguson
FW	ENG	Jason Lee
FW	ENG	Gordon Watson
FW	ENG	Carl Leaburn
