= 1992–93 Newcastle United F.C. season =

Newcastle United
1992–93 season
- Chairman: Sir John Hall
- Manager: Kevin Keegan
- Stadium: St James' Park
- Division One: 1st
- FA Cup: Fifth round
- League Cup: Third round
- Anglo-Italian Cup: First round
- Top goalscorer: League: David Kelly (24); All: David Kelly (28)
- Highest home attendance: 30,364 (vs. Sunderland)
- Lowest home attendance: 4,609 (vs. Cesena)
- Average home league attendance: 29,048
Home colours	Away colours

During the 1992–93 season, Newcastle United participated in the Football League Division One.

Newcastle secured promotion to the top flight by winning the First Division Championship, often simply overwhelming opponents along the way (a 7–1 victory over Leicester City being particularly memorable). The Magpies joined the elite FA Premier League for the 1993–94 season.

== Season summary ==
After narrowly avoiding relegation from the old Second Division (renamed the First Division) the previous season, Kevin Keegan's Newcastle swept away all others before them, nearly breaking the English record for consecutive wins along the way before a 1–0 defeat at home to Grimsby Town broke the sequence.

The Newcastle team was spearheaded by the prolific striker Andy Cole and David Kelly, who were ably supported by midfielders Paul Bracewell, Gavin Peacock, Rob Lee, and Brian 'Killer' Kilcline (a tough free transfer defender who Keegan later claimed was his best signing).

Coincidentally it was the return game at Grimsby that saw Newcastle clinch promotion and the league title with a 2–0 win on an emotional night for the club's supporters, who invaded the pitch at the final whistle to congratulate their 'King Kev' and the players for returning the club to the top flight after a four-year exile. Late in the season, Keegan had signed young striker Andy Cole from Bristol City, who repaid his transfer fee by scoring 12 goals in the final 11 games of the season. In anticipation of a campaign in the new Premier League, Keegan re-signed a 1980s Newcastle hero, his former Newcastle strike partner Peter Beardsley from Everton in the close season.

=== Image gallery ===
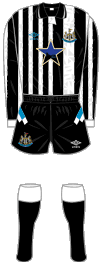
Newcastle United kit, 1991–93

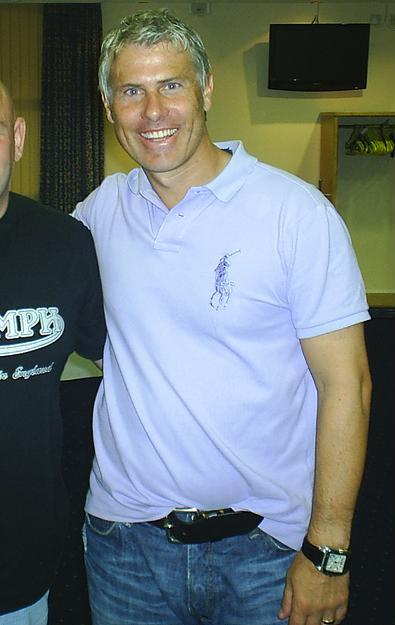
Robert Lee, who signed for Newcastle early in the season

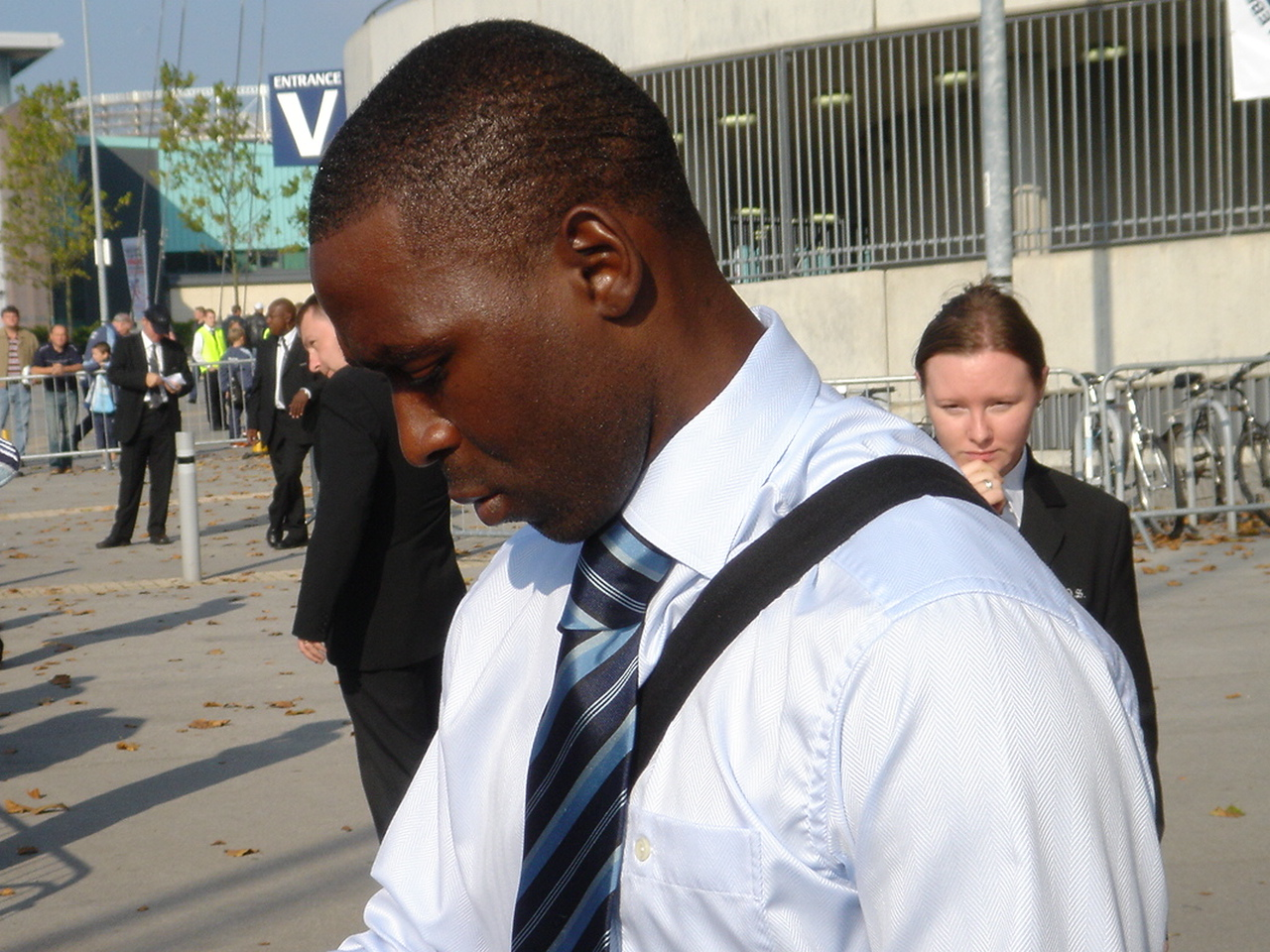
Andy Cole

New arrival in 1992, defender Barry Venison

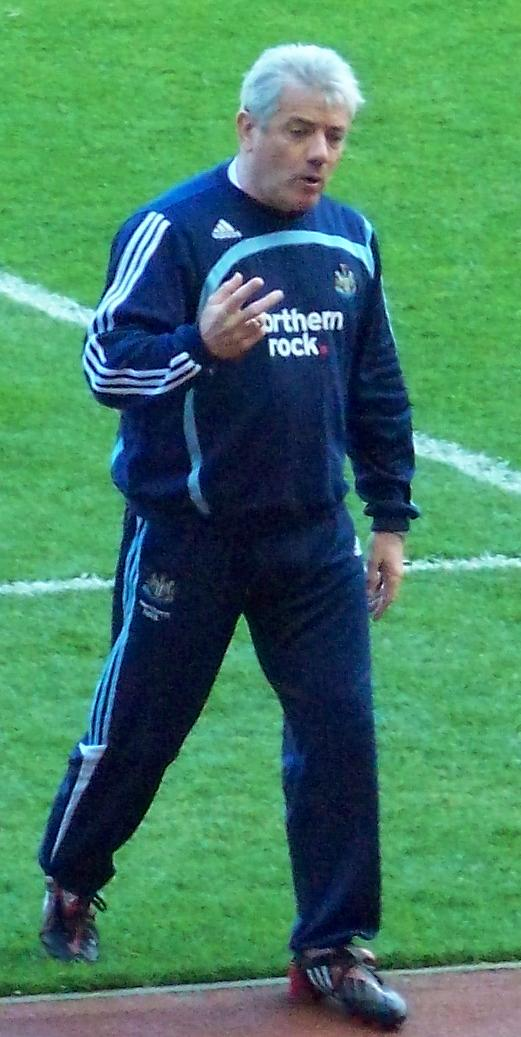
Manager Kevin Keegan

== Appearances, goals and cards ==
(Substitute appearances in brackets)

Pos.	Name	League		FA Cup		League Cup		Anglo-Italian Cup		Total		Discipline	
Pos.	Name	Apps	Goals	Apps	Goals	Apps	Goals	Apps	Goals	Apps	Goals	Yellow card	Red card
GK	(Czech Republic) Pavel Srníček	32	0	4	0	0	0	5	0	41	0	1	0
GK	(Northern Ireland) Tommy Wright	14	0	0	0	5	0	1	0	20	0	0	0
DF	(England) Matty Appleby	0	0	0	0	0	0	2 (1)	0	2 (1)	0	1	0
DF	(England) Richie Appleby	0	0	0	0	0	0	2	0	2	0	0	0
DF	(England) John Beresford	42	1	4	0	4	0	2	0	52	1	6	0
DF	(England) Steve Howey	41	2	3	0	5	0	4	0	53	2	4	0
DF	(England) Brian Kilcline	7 (12)	0	1 (2)	0	2	0	5	0	15 (14)	0	1	0
DF	(Denmark) Bjørn Kristensen	0	0	0	0	0	0	3 (1)	1	3 (1)	1	0	0
DF	(Wales) Alan Neilson	2 (1)	0	0	0	1	0	3	0	6 (1)	0	0	0
DF	(England) Ray Ranson	3	0	0	0	1	0	0 (1)	0	4 (1)	0	0	0
DF	(England) Mark Robinson	2 (7)	0	0	0	0	0	0	0	2 (7)	0	0	0
DF	(England) Kevin Scott	45	2	4	0	5	0	2	0	56	2	5	0
DF	(England) Mark Stimson	1 (1)	0	0	0	0	0	2	0	3 (1)	0	0	0
DF	(England) Barry Venison	44	0	4	0	4	0	3	0	55	0	4	0
DF	(England) John Watson	0	0	0	0	0	0	0 (1)	0	0 (1)	0	0	0
DF	(England) Steve Watson	1 (1)	0	0	0	0	0	2 (1)	3 (2)	0	0	0	0
MF	(England) Paul Bracewell	18 (6)	2	2 (2)	0	0	0	2	0	22 (8)	2	1	0
MF	(England) Kevin Brock	4 (3)	1	0	0	2	0	2 (1)	1	8 (4)	2	0	0
MF	(England) Franz Carr	8 (2)	1	0	0	1 (2)	0	3 (1)	0	12 (5)	1	0	0
MF	(England) Lee Clark	46	9	4	1	5	0	5	0	58	10	0	0
MF	(England) Peter Garland	0	0	0	0	0	0	0 (1)	0	0 (1)	0	0	0
MF	(England) Robert Lee	36	10	4	2	3	1	0	0	43	13	1	0
MF	(Republic of Ireland) Liam O'Brien	33	6	4	0	3	1	3	0	43	7	5	0
MF	(England) Gavin Peacock	30 (3)	12	4	2	4	2	2	2	40 (3)	18	2	0
MF	(England) David Roche	0	0	0	0	0	0	0 (1)	0	0 (1)	0	0	0
MF	(England) Scott Sellars	13	2	0	0	0	0	0	0	13	2	1	0
MF	(Republic of Ireland) Kevin Sheedy	23 (1)	3	2 (1)	1	4	0	4	1	33 (2)	5	1	1
MF	(England) Alan Thompson	1 (1)	0	0	0	0	0	3	0	4 (1)	0	0	0
FW	(England) Andy Cole	11 (1)	12	0	0	0	0	0	0	11 (1)	12	1	0
FW	(England) Andy Hunt	0	0	0	0	0	0	2	0	2	0	0	0
FW	(Republic of Ireland) David Kelly	45	24	4	1	4	2	4	1	57	28	2	1
FW	(England) Micky Quinn	4 (1)	2	0	0	2 (2)	0	2 (1)	3	8 (4)	5	2	0

=== Coaching staff ===
Position	Staff
Manager	(England) Kevin Keegan
Assistant Manager	(England) Terry McDermott
Head Coach	(England) Arthur Cox
Goalkeeping Coach	(England) Jim Montgomery
First Team Coach	(England) Derek Fazackerley
Reserve Team Coach	(England) []
Chief scout	(Scotland) []

Last updated: 3 May 2011

== Transfers ==
=== In ===
Date	Pos.	Name	From	Fee
16 June 1992	MF	(England) Paul Bracewell	Sunderland	£250,000
2 July 1992	DF	(England) John Beresford	Portsmouth	£650,000
31 July 1992	DF	(England) Barry Venison	Liverpool	£250,000
22 September 1992	MF	(England) Robert Lee	Charlton Athletic	£700,000
9 March 1993	DF	(England) Mark Robinson	Barnsley	£450,000
9 March 1993	MF	(England) Scott Sellars	Leeds United	£700,000
12 March 1993	FW	(England) Andy Cole	Bristol City	£1,750,000

- Total spending: ▼£4.75m

=== Out ===
Date	Pos.	Name	To	Fee
20 July 1992	MF	(England) Lee Makel	Blackburn Rovers	£160,000
19 December 1992	MF	(England) Peter Garland	Charlton Athletic	£35,000
22 December 1992	FW	(England) Micky Quinn	Coventry City	£250,000
January 1993	DF	(England) Ray Ranson	Manchester City	
26 March 1993	DF	(Denmark) Bjørn Kristensen	Portsmouth	£120,000
8 April 1993	MF	(England) Franz Carr	Sheffield United	£180,000

- Total income: ▲£745k

=== Loans out ===
Date	Pos.	Name	To	Expiry
November 1992	DF	(Denmark) Bjørn Kristensen	Bristol City	March 1993
January 1993	MF	(England) Franz Carr	Sheffield United	April 1993

== Competitions ==
Win Draw Loss

=== Pre-season ===
Match	1	2	3	4	5
Result	0–1	3–1	1–1	1–0	3–5

=== League ===
Pos	Team	Pld	W	D	L	GF	GA	GD	Pts	Qualification or relegation
1	Newcastle United (C, P)	46	29	9	8	92	38	+54	96	Promotion to the Premier League
2	West Ham United (P)	46	26	10	10	81	41	+40	88	Promotion to the Premier League
3	Portsmouth	46	26	10	10	80	46	+34	88	Qualification for the First Division play-offs
4	Tranmere Rovers	46	23	10	13	72	56	+16	79	Qualification for the First Division play-offs
5	Swindon Town (O, P)	46	21	13	12	74	59	+15	76	Qualification for the First Division play-offs

Source: rsssf.com
Rules for classification: 1) Points; 2) Goals scored; 3) Goal difference
(C) Champions; (O) Play-off winners; (P) Promoted

Round	1	2	3	4	5	6	7	8	9	10	11	12	13	14	15	16	17	18	19	20	21	22	23
Result	3–2	2–1	2–0	2–0	2–1	3–1	5–0	1–0	2–1	1–0	2–1	0–1	1–2	3–2	0–0	3–1	2–0	4–1	2–0	0–1	1–1	2–1	2–4
Position	3rd	4th	4th	2nd	2nd	1st	1st	1st	1st	1st	1st	1st	1st	1st	1st	1st	1st	1st	1st	1st	1st	1st	1st

Round	24	25	26	27	28	29	30	31	32	33	34	35	36	37	38	39	40	41	42	43	44	45	46
Result	2–1	3–0	1–1	0–0	1–1	0–2	0–0	0–0	3–0	5–1	2–2	1–2	4–0	0–1	2–2	3–0	6–0	0–1	2–1	1–0	2–0	2–1	7–1
Position	1st	1st	1st	1st	1st	1st	1st	1st	1st	1st	1st	1st	1st	1st	1st	1st	1st	1st	1st	1st	1st	1st	1st

=== FA Cup ===
Match	1	2	3	4
Result	4–0	1–1	2–0	0–1

=== League Cup ===
Match	1	2	3	4	5
Result	2–1	0–0	0–0	3–1	1–2

=== Anglo-Italian Cup ===
Match	1	2	3	4	5	6
Result	2–2	4–0	1–1	0–1	0–3	2–2

== Matches ==
=== Pre-season ===
27 July 1992	Heart of Midlothian	1 – 0	Newcastle United	Edinburgh
	Baird 49'			Stadium: Tynecastle Stadium; Attendance: 11,105

1 August 1992	York City	1 – 3	Newcastle United	York
	Tilley 63'		Sheedy 17'; Peacock 46'; Carr 79'	Stadium: Bootham Crescent; Attendance: 3,424

4 August 1992	Doncaster Rovers	1 – 1	Newcastle United	Doncaster
	Jeffrey 83'		O'Brien 75'	Stadium: Belle Vue; Attendance: 3,951

8 August 1992	Newcastle United	1 – 0	Middlesbrough	Newcastle upon Tyne
	Peacock 38' (pen.)			Stadium: St James' Park; Attendance: 8,548

9 August 1992	Newcastle United	3 – 5	Sporting CP	Newcastle upon Tyne
	Clark 21'; Peacock 45', 46'		Balakov 62', 90'; Filipe 67', 71'; Cadete 80'	Stadium: St James' Park; Attendance: 7,764

=== Division 1 ===
15 August 1992	Newcastle United	3 – 2	Southend United	Newcastle upon Tyne
	Bracewell 5'; Prior 10' (o.g.); Clark 70'		Martin 57'; Benjamin 76'	Stadium: St James' Park; Attendance: 28,545

22 August 1992	Derby County	1 – 2	Newcastle United	Derby
	Pembridge 83'		Peacock 51'; Clark 55'	Stadium: Baseball Ground; Attendance: 17,522

29 August 1992	Newcastle United	2 – 0	West Ham United	Newcastle upon Tyne
	Peacock 44'; Kelly 45'			Stadium: St James' Park; Attendance: 29,855

2 September 1992	Newcastle United	2 – 0	Luton Town	Newcastle upon Tyne
	Clark 35'; Kelly 44'			Stadium: St James' Park; Attendance: 27,059

5 September 1992	Bristol Rovers	1 – 2	Newcastle United	Bath
	J. Taylor 72'		Sheedy 12'; O'Brien 73'	Stadium: Twerton Park; Attendance: 7,487

12 September 1992	Newcastle United	3 – 1	Portsmouth	Newcastle upon Tyne
	Quinn 16', 74'; Kelly 41'		Whittingham 82'	Stadium: St James' Park; Attendance: 29,885

19 September 1992	Newcastle United	5 – 0	Bristol City	Newcastle upon Tyne
	O'Brien 40'; Peacock 45' (pen.), 68' (pen.); Carr 64'; Brock 86'			Stadium: St James' Park; Attendance: 29,465

26 September 1992	Peterborough United	0 – 1	Newcastle United	Peterborough
			Sheedy 60'	Stadium: London Road Stadium; Attendance: 14,487

4 October 1992	Brentford	1 – 2	Newcastle United	London
	Blissett 78'		Kelly 10'; Peacock 64'	Stadium: Griffin Park; Attendance: 10,131

10 October 1992	Newcastle United	1 – 0	Tranmere Rovers	Newcastle upon Tyne
	Kelly 37'			Stadium: St James' Park; Attendance: 30,137

18 October 1992	Sunderland	1 – 2	Newcastle United	Sunderland
	Armstrong 70'		Owers 12' (o.g.); O'Brien 76'	Stadium: Roker Park; Attendance: 28,098

24 October 1992	Newcastle United	0 – 1	Grimsby Town	Newcastle upon Tyne
			Dobbin 89'	Stadium: St James' Park; Attendance: 30,088

31 October 1992	Leicester City	2 – 1	Newcastle United	Leicester
	Lowe 3'; Davison 15'		O'Brien 67'; Sheedy (red card)	Stadium: Filbert Street; Attendance: 19,687

4 November 1992	Birmingham City	2 – 3	Newcastle United	Birmingham
	Speedie 9'; Potter 33'		Peacock 7'; Scott 31'; Matthewson 38' (o.g.)	Stadium: St Andrew's; Attendance: 14,376

8 November 1992	Newcastle United	0 – 0	Swindon Town	Newcastle upon Tyne
				Stadium: St James' Park; Attendance: 28,091

14 November 1992	Charlton Athletic	1 – 3	Newcastle United	London
	Nelson 49'		Peacock 3', 35'; Howey 63'	Stadium: Boleyn Ground; Attendance: 12,495

21 November 1992	Newcastle United	2 – 0	Watford	Newcastle upon Tyne
	Peacock 51'; Lee 57'			Stadium: St James' Park; Attendance: 28,871

28 November 1992	Newcastle United	4 – 1	Cambridge United	Newcastle upon Tyne
	Kelly 26', 55', 86' (pen.); Peacock 90'		Claridge 82'	Stadium: St James' Park; Attendance: 27,991

5 December 1992	Notts County	0 – 2	Newcastle United	Nottingham
			Sheedy 47'; Peacock 86'	Stadium: Meadow Lane; Attendance: 14,840

13 December 1992	Barnsley	1 – 0	Newcastle United	Barnsley
	O'Connell 49'			Stadium: Oakwell; Attendance: 13,263

20 December 1992	Newcastle United	1 – 1	Millwall	Newcastle upon Tyne
	Kelly 75' (pen.)		Moralee 20'	Stadium: St James' Park; Attendance: 26,089

26 December 1992	Newcastle United	2 – 1	Wolverhampton Wanderers	Newcastle upon Tyne
	Kelly 43', 66'		Cook 33'	Stadium: St James' Park; Attendance: 30,137

28 December 1992	Oxford United	4 – 2	Newcastle United	Oxford
	Durnin 4'; Cusack 8'; Magilton 34' (pen.), 81'		O'Brien 9'; Clark 38'	Stadium: Manor Ground; Attendance: 9,293

9 January 1993	Bristol City	1 – 2	Newcastle United	Bristol
	Allison 19'		Kelly 22'; Scott 31'	Stadium: Ashton Gate Stadium; Attendance: 15,446

16 January 1993	Newcastle United	3 – 0	Peterborough United	Newcastle upon Tyne
	Lee 30', 70'; Kelly 88'			Stadium: St James' Park; Attendance: 29,155

20 January 1993	Southend United	1 – 1	Newcastle United	Southend-on-Sea
	Sussex 39' (pen.)		Peacock 28'	Stadium: Roots Hall; Attendance: 8,246

27 January 1993	Luton Town	0 – 0	Newcastle United	Luton
				Stadium: Kenilworth Road; Attendance: 10,237

31 January 1993	Newcastle United	1 – 1	Derby County	Newcastle upon Tyne
	O'Brien 90'		Johnson 2'	Stadium: St James' Park; Attendance: 27,285

9 February 1993	Portsmouth	2 – 0	Newcastle United	Portsmouth
	Whittingham 13'; Symons 40'			Stadium: Fratton Park; Attendance: 21,028

21 February 1993	West Ham United	0 – 0	Newcastle United	London
				Stadium: Boleyn Ground; Attendance: 24,159

24 February 1993	Newcastle United	0 – 0	Bristol Rovers	Newcastle upon Tyne
				Stadium: St James' Park; Attendance: 29,372

28 February 1993	Tranmere Rovers	0 – 3	Newcastle United	Birkenhead
			Lee 26', 87'; Kelly 42'	Stadium: Prenton Park; Attendance: 13,082

6 March 1993	Newcastle United	5 – 1	Brentford	Newcastle upon Tyne
	Kelly 24'; Bracewell 49'; Clark 55', 83'; Lee 72'		Scott 58' (o.g.)	Stadium: St James' Park; Attendance: 30,006

10 March 1993	Newcastle United	2 – 2	Charlton Athletic	Newcastle upon Tyne
	Lee 1'; Kelly 45'		Nelson 9'; Leaburn 48'	Stadium: St James' Park; Attendance: 29,582

13 March 1993	Swindon Town	2 – 1	Newcastle United	Swindon
	Bodin 51' (pen.); Calderwood 55'		Kelly 43'	Stadium: County Ground; Attendance: 17,574

20 March 1993	Newcastle United	4 – 0	Notts County	Newcastle upon Tyne
	Lee 32'; Kelly 53', 62'; Cole 70'			Stadium: St James' Park; Attendance: 30,029

23 March 1993	Watford	1 – 0	Newcastle United	Watford
	Furlong 58'			Stadium: Vicarage Road; Attendance: 11,634

28 March 1993	Newcastle United	2 – 2	Birmingham City	Newcastle upon Tyne
	Cole 60'; Lee 62'		Saville 32'; Rodgerson 38'	Stadium: St James' Park; Attendance: 27,087

3 April 1993	Cambridge United	0 – 3	Newcastle United	Cambridge
			Howey 41'; Kelly 46'; Cole 53'	Stadium: Abbey Stadium; Attendance: 7,925

7 April 1993	Newcastle United	6 – 0	Barnsley	Newcastle upon Tyne
	Cole 16', 44', 46'; Clark 65'; Beresford 67' (pen.); Sellars 72'			Stadium: St James' Park; Attendance: 29,460

10 April 1993	Wolverhampton Wanderers	1 – 0	Newcastle United	Wolverhampton
	Mutch 54'			Stadium: Molineux Stadium; Attendance: 17,244

17 April 1993	Millwall	1 – 2	Newcastle United	London
	Barber 18'		Clark 65'; Cole 73'	Stadium: The Den; Attendance: 14,262

25 April 1993	Newcastle United	1 – 0	Sunderland	Newcastle upon Tyne
	Sellars 10'			Stadium: St James' Park; Attendance: 30,364

4 May 1993	Grimsby Town	0 – 2	Newcastle United	Cleethorpes
			Cole 46'; Kelly 90'	Stadium: Blundell Park; Attendance: 14,402

6 May 1993	Newcastle United	2 – 1	Oxford United	Newcastle upon Tyne
	Clark 70'; Cole 78'		Cusack 79'	Stadium: St James' Park; Attendance: 29,438

9 May 1993	Newcastle United	7 – 1	Leicester City	Newcastle upon Tyne
	Cole 5', 40', 66'; Lee 13'; Kelly 28', 34', 45'		Walsh 82'	Stadium: St James' Park; Attendance: 30,129

=== FA Cup ===
2 January 1993 Round 3	Newcastle United	4 – 0	Port Vale	Newcastle upon Tyne
	Peacock 49', 62'; Lee 66'; Sheedy 80'			Stadium: St James' Park; Attendance: 29,873

23 January 1993 Round 4	Rotherham United	1 – 1	Newcastle United	Rotherham
	Johnson 63'		Lee 28'	Stadium: Millmoor; Attendance: 13,405

3 February 1993 Round 4 Replay	Newcastle United	2 – 0	Rotherham United	Newcastle upon Tyne
	Kelly 50'; Clark 89'			Stadium: St James' Park; Attendance: 29,005

13 February 1993 Round 5	Blackburn Rovers	1 – 0	Newcastle United	Blackburn
	Wegerle 89'			Stadium: Ewood Park; Attendance: 19,972

=== League Cup ===
19 August 1992 Round 1 1st leg	Newcastle United	2 – 1	Mansfield Town	Newcastle upon Tyne
	Peacock 2', 82'		Stant 67'	Stadium: St James' Park; Attendance: 14,083

25 August 1992 Round 1 2nd leg	Mansfield Town	0 – 0 (1 – 2 agg.)	Newcastle United	Mansfield
				Stadium: Field Mill; Attendance: 6,725

23 September 1992 Round 2 1st leg	Newcastle United	0 – 0	Middlesbrough	Newcastle upon Tyne
				Stadium: St James' Park; Attendance: 25,814

7 October 1992 Round 2 2nd leg	Middlesbrough	1 – 3 (1 – 3 agg.)	Newcastle United	Middlesbrough
	Wilkinson 56'		Kelly 39', 88'; O'Brien 78'	Stadium: Ayresome Park; Attendance: 24,390

28 October 1992 Round 3	Chelsea	2 – 1	Newcastle United	London
	Sinclar 58'; Harford 82'		Lee 77'	Stadium: Stamford Bridge; Attendance: 30,193

=== Anglo-Italian Cup ===
16 September 1992 Prelim Round Group 2	Grimsby Town	2 – 2	Newcastle United	Cleethorpes
	Rees 38'; Groves 52'		Quinn 5'; Kelly 15'	Stadium: Blundell Park; Attendance: 2,159

30 September 1992 Prelim Round Group 2	Newcastle United	4 – 0	Leicester City	Newcastle upon Tyne
	Brock 10'; Quinn 44' (pen.), 84'; Sheedy 59'			Stadium: St James' Park; Attendance: 14,046

11 November 1992 Group A	Lucchese	1 – 1	Newcastle United	Lucca
	Russo 60'		Kristensen 47'	Stadium: Stadio Porta Elisa; Attendance: 744

24 November 1992 Group A	Newcastle United	0 – 1	Ascoli	Newcastle upon Tyne
	Kelly (red card)		Bierhoff 63'	Stadium: St James' Park; Attendance: 9,789

8 December 1992 Group A	Bari	3 – 0	Newcastle United	Bari
	Capocchiano 5', 27'; Tovalieri 88'			Stadium: Stadio San Nicola; Attendance: 1,229

16 December 1992 Group A	Newcastle United	2 – 2	Cesena	Newcastle upon Tyne
	Peacock 38', 64'		Hübner 2'; Pazzaglia 71'	Stadium: St James' Park; Attendance: 4,609
