= Kevin Brock (footballer) =

English footballer and manager

Personal information
- Full name: Kevin Stanley Brock
- Date of birth: 9 September 1962 (age 64)
- Place of birth: Bicester, England
- Height: 5 ft 9 in (1.75 m)
- Position: Midfielder

Senior career*
Years	Team	Apps	(Gls)
1979–1987	Oxford United	246	(26)
1987–1989	Queens Park Rangers	40	(2)
1989–1994	Newcastle United	145	(14)
1993–1994	→ Cardiff City (loan)	14	(2)
1994–1995	Stockport County		
1994–1995	Stevenage	6	(1)
1994–1995	Yeovil Town	15	(2)
1996–1998	Oxford City	54	(1)
1998	Banbury United		
1998–1999	Bicester Town		
1999–????	Banbury United		

International career
1978	England Schoolboys	8	(1)
1984–1986	England U21	4	(0)

Managerial career
- 1997–1998: Oxford City
- 1999–2007: Banbury United
- 2008–2015: Ardley United
- * Club domestic league appearances and goals

Kevin Stanley Brock (born 9 September 1962) is an English former footballer who played in the Football League as a midfielder for Oxford United, Queens Park Rangers, Newcastle United and Cardiff City. He was capped for England at under-21 and B international level. After his playing career ended, he managed a series of non-league clubs in Oxfordshire, most recently Hellenic League Premier Division club Ardley United.

== Playing career ==
Brock signed professional forms for Oxford United in 1979 and spent eight years at the club, scoring 26 goals from 246 League games. He was with Oxford as they rose through the divisions, enjoyed two years in the First Division with the club, and played in the team who defeated Queens Park Rangers in the 1986 League Cup Final. Brock holds a special place in Everton's supporters' folklore: in a League Cup tie against Everton at the Manor Ground in January 1984, Brock's back pass was intercepted by Adrian Heath, who scored a late equaliser; Everton won the replay, and this is viewed as the moment when their fortunes began to improve.

He was part of the England under-21 team that won the European championships in 1984.

In August 1987, fellow First Division club Queens Park Rangers bought him for £260,000. He played 40 League matches scoring two goals in his one-and-a-half-year period at the club. Shortly after leaving Loftus Road to manage Newcastle United, Jim Smith then paid £300,000 for the midfielder on 8 December 1988 to take him to Tyneside.

In a six-year period, he played 145 matches and scored 15 goals. He was unable to stop them from sliding out of the First Division in 1988–89, but remained a regular player in the Newcastle midfield until the arrival of Robert Lee in the autumn of 1992, meaning that he played little part in Newcastle's promotion-winning side that season and didn't play a single first team game the following season, when Newcastle appeared in the FA Premier League. Brock's most memorable contribution during the promotion campaign came as a deputy goalkeeper. Stepping in for the injured Tommy Wright, he did an admirable job in a 3–2 victory at Birmingham City in November.

Far down the pecking order at Newcastle he played in 14 matches scoring two goals while on loan to Cardiff City in the 1993–94 season.

Following his Newcastle release he finished his Football League playing career with Stockport County then playing in the third tier of English football. After leaving the club he had further short-term spells with Conference sides Stevenage and Yeovil Town.

== Managerial career ==
Brock was sacked as player-manager of Oxford City after seven months in charge, as the club were relegated from the Isthmian League Premier Division at the end of the 1997–1998 season. He then briefly joined Banbury United as a player, and then Bicester Town, before returning to Banbury before the 1999–2000 season as player-manager. In his first season, he led the team to the Hellenic League Premier Division championship, followed by promotion to the Southern Football League Premier Division four years later. After three seasons at that level, Brock resigned because of budget cuts.

He temporarily took an assistant manager role at Woodford United, before agreeing to take over as manager of Hellenic League Premier Division club Ardley United from the end of the 2008–09 season, before resigning in early September 2015. His league record at Ardley over his spell in charge of the club was played 286, won 169, drew 45 and lost 72. The team never finished lower than 8th in the table with a best of 2nd in the 2013–14 season, in addition to which they won the Hellenic Premier League Cup twice, the Floodlit Cup once and most memorably the Oxfordshire Senior Cup in the 2013–14 season.

== Honours ==
Oxford United

- Football League Third Division: 1983–84
- Football League Cup: 1985–86
