= Simon Webster =

Simon Webster may refer to:

- Simon Webster (rugby union)
- Simon Webster (footballer)
