= Alan Pardew =

English football player and manager (born 1961)

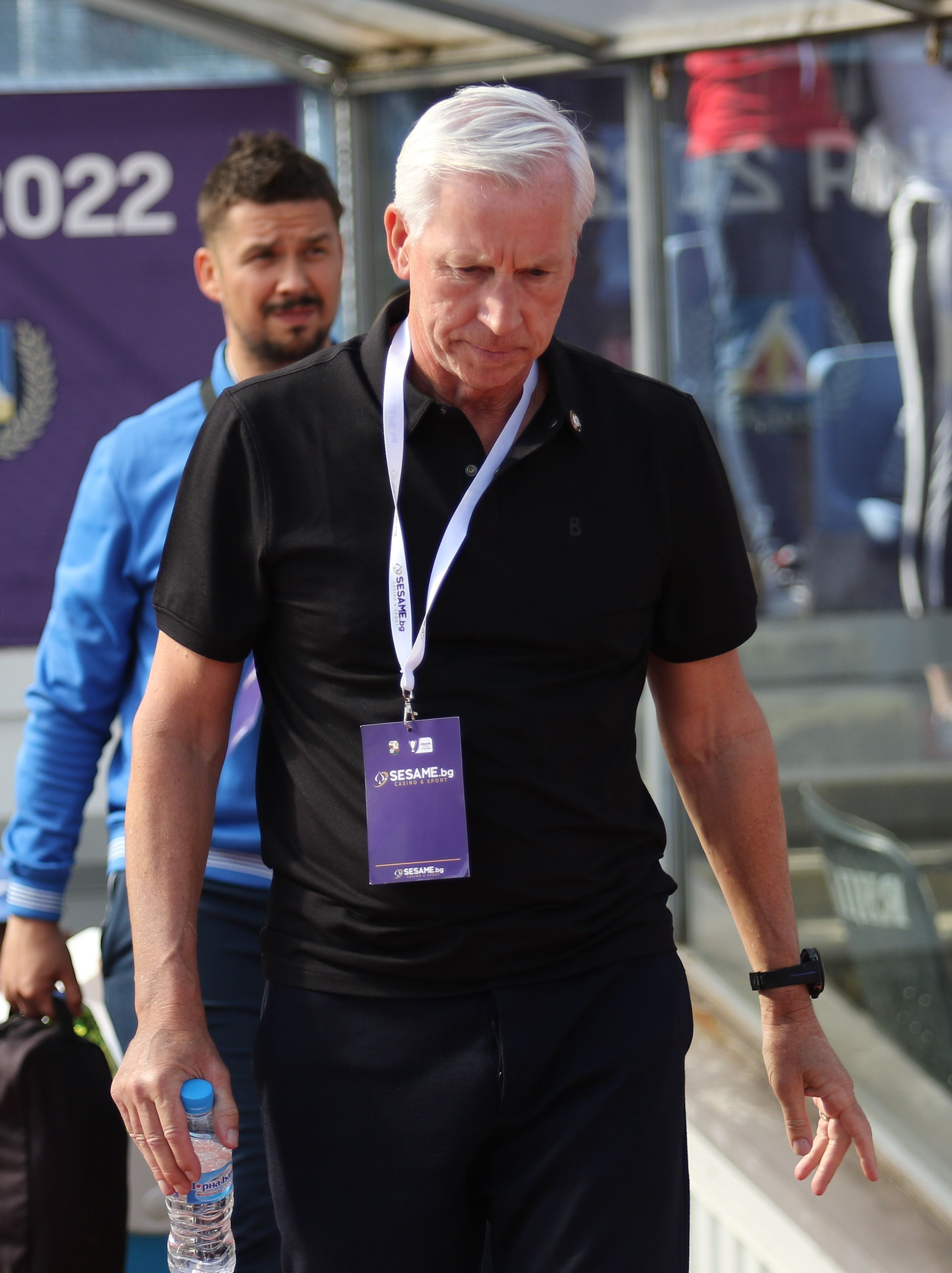
- Pardew in 2022

Personal information
- Full name: Alan Scott Pardew
- Date of birth: 18 July 1961 (age 65)
- Place of birth: Wimbledon, England
- Height: 6 ft 0 in (1.83 m)
- Position: Midfielder

Senior career*
Years	Team	Apps	(Gls)
1980–1981	Whyteleafe		
1981–1983	Epsom & Ewell		
1983–1984	Corinthian-Casuals		
1984–1986	Dulwich Hamlet		
1986–1987	Yeovil Town		
1987–1991	Crystal Palace	128	(8)
1991–1995	Charlton Athletic	104	(24)
1995	→ Tottenham Hotspur (loan)	0	(0)
1995–1997	Barnet	67	(0)
1997–1998	Reading	0	(0)
Total		299	(32)

Managerial career
- 1998: Reading (caretaker)
- 1999–2003: Reading
- 2003–2006: West Ham United
- 2006–2008: Charlton Athletic
- 2009–2010: Southampton
- 2010–2014: Newcastle United
- 2015–2016: Crystal Palace
- 2017–2018: West Bromwich Albion
- 2019–2020: ADO Den Haag
- 2022: CSKA Sofia
- 2022–2023: Aris
- * Club domestic league appearances and goals

Alan Scott Pardew (born 18 July 1961) is an English football manager and former professional footballer, who most recently managed Greek Super League club Aris Thessaloniki.

Pardew's highest achievements in the sport include reaching the FA Cup final three times: as a player with Crystal Palace in 1990 and as a manager with West Ham United in 2006 and in 2016 when his Crystal Palace side lost to Manchester United. He has also achieved promotion three times in his career, as a player with Palace and as a manager with Reading and West Ham. He managed Newcastle United from 2010 to 2014.

As manager of Newcastle, Pardew won both the Premier League Manager of the Season and the LMA Manager of the Year awards for the 2011–12 season after guiding the Magpies to European football for the first time since the club's return to the Premier League. He later managed Crystal Palace, West Bromwich Albion and ADO Den Haag, as well as working as a Sky Sports pundit for the 2017–18 Premier League season.

== Playing career ==
=== Early career ===
Pardew was born in Wimbledon, London. He started his career as a part-time player in non-League football at Whyteleafe and Epsom & Ewell, while working as a glazier. At one stage, he gave up football for six months while working in the Middle East, but he returned to football at Corinthian Casuals, before later having spells at Dulwich Hamlet and Yeovil Town. Pardew was also in the England semi-professional squad during this time.

=== Crystal Palace ===
Pardew moved to Second Division club Crystal Palace in 1987 for a fee of £7,500. In 1989, he helped Palace win promotion to the First Division after beating Blackburn Rovers in the play-offs. The following year, in 1990, he scored the winning goal as Palace beat Liverpool 4–3 after extra time in the FA Cup semi-final at Villa Park. He then played in both the final and the final replay as Palace lost to Manchester United.

Palace continued to impress in the First Division, and in 1990–91 secured their highest-ever league finish of third, with Pardew also featuring as Palace beat Everton to win the Full Members' Cup at Wembley Stadium.

=== Later career ===
Pardew moved to Charlton Athletic in November 1991, and was Charlton's top scorer in the 1992–93 season with ten goals. In 1995, Pardew appeared four times on loan at Tottenham Hotspur in the 1995 UEFA Intertoto Cup. He played in the team who suffered the heaviest loss in Spurs' history, when they lost 8–0 away to German side 1. FC Köln. Spurs had fielded a team made up of reserves and loanees, including Pardew, for their final group game in Cologne.

After rejecting an opportunity to play in Hong Kong, Pardew then moved to Barnet, and became a player-coach under manager Terry Bullivant. When Bullivant moved to Reading in 1997, he took Pardew with him as reserve-team manager.

=== International career ===
At international level, Pardew was a member of the England semi-professional squad during his time playing in English non-League football for Dulwich Hamlet and Yeovil Town.

== Managerial career ==
=== Reading ===
Pardew's first experience as manager came in March 1998 when he was appointed as caretaker after the departure of Bullivant. His first match in charge was against Huddersfield Town on 21 March 1998, which Reading lost 0–2. After the appointment of Tommy Burns, he remained as reserve team manager until the end of the 1998–99 season, when Reading disbanded their reserve team. Nevertheless, he was promoted to manager of the club after a successful spell as caretaker in 1999. He turned the club around from relegation fighters to promotion candidates through players, such as Jamie Cureton, and his régime to increase the fitness of the squad.

Pardew's Reading side lost 3–2 to Walsall in a Division Two play-off final at the end of the 2000–01 season, but this was redeemed the next season as the club achieved automatic promotion to Division One. Pardew's first season in the higher division was impressive, as the club finished fourth. They lost in the play-offs again, this time to Wolverhampton Wanderers.

=== West Ham United ===
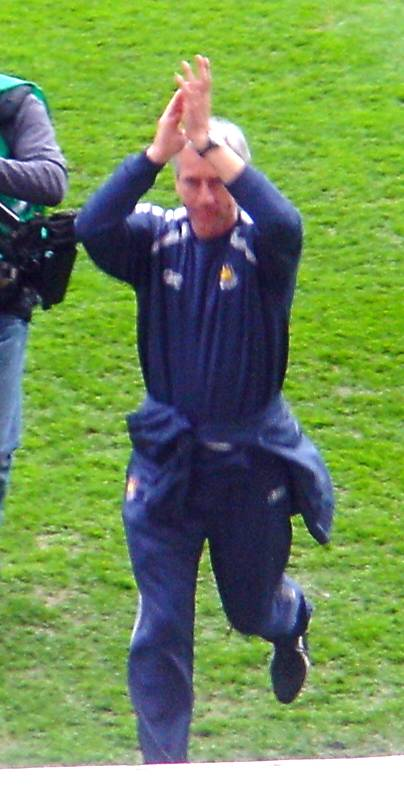
Pardew as manager of West Ham United in 2006

Early into the 2003–04 season, West Ham United asked Reading permission to appoint Pardew as their new manager. Although Reading refused permission, Pardew resigned from his position on 10 September 2003. Eventually, a compromise agreement was reached, allowing Pardew to become manager at West Ham.

Pardew's first season at West Ham resulted in a play-off final defeat to his former club Crystal Palace. In the 2004–05 season, West Ham struggled to find promotion form, with Pardew coming under pressure from the club's supporters. West Ham eventually succeeded in gaining promotion to the Premier League after defeating Preston North End in the play-off final. Pardew guided the Hammers to ninth place in the Premier League in the 2005–06 season, which culminated in an appearance in the final of the FA Cup. After drawing 3–3 with Liverpool at the end of extra time, West Ham lost on penalties, resulting in the second FA Cup final defeat of Pardew's career.

In the 2006–07 season, Pardew was criticised after seeing West Ham through their worst run of defeats in over 70 years, which included an exit from the UEFA Cup to Palermo in the first round, and a League Cup defeat to Chesterfield. West Ham's new owners stated their support for Pardew, but on 11 December 2006, following a 4–0 defeat away at Bolton Wanderers the previous weekend, Pardew was dismissed by the club.

=== Charlton Athletic ===
Pardew's absence from management lasted less than two weeks, after which he was appointed manager of Charlton Athletic on 24 December 2006, signing a three-and-a-half-year contract. He took over with Charlton in 19th place in the Premier League, with just 12 points and a minus – 20 goal difference, the lowest in the league. Although Charlton's form improved under Pardew, he was unable to keep Charlton up, resulting in the first relegation of his career, both as a player and manager.

To spearhead their return to the Premier League, Pardew signed Chris Iwelumo and Luke Varney in the 2007–08 season. But Charlton failed to mount a serious promotion challenge, and finished the season in eleventh place. This put Pardew under pressure entering the 2008–09 season, but Charlton started the season off well with victories over Reading and Swansea City. Charlton's form, however, quickly deteriorated and they were near the foot of the table after eight games without a win. After a 5–2 home defeat to Sheffield United, hundreds of supporters remained for more than an hour to condemn their manager, chanting, "We want Pardew out" and "We want our club back" after Charlton had slipped into the Championship's bottom three. On 22 November 2008, Pardew parted company with Charlton by mutual consent.

=== Southampton ===
Pardew was named the new manager of Southampton on 17 July 2009, after the new owner Markus Liebherr had taken over the club and dismissed Mark Wotte a day after completing the deal to save the Saints. Pardew's first signing for the club was Dan Harding, who signed on a free transfer after being released by Ipswich Town. His first league match in charge was against Millwall on 8 August 2009, which ended in a 1–1 draw. He brought many new signings to the club, including League One strikers Rickie Lambert and Lee Barnard, the first of whom cost £1 million. Pardew led his side up the League One table, and, despite their ten-point deduction, their challenge for a playoff place was kept alive until there were just two league games remaining.

Pardew led Southampton to the 2010 League Trophy final at Wembley Stadium, where they won 4–1 against Carlisle United. The win gave the club their first trophy since 1976. Five months later, Pardew was dismissed by the club, amidst reports of low staff morale and conflicts between Pardew and club chairman Nicola Cortese.

=== Newcastle United ===
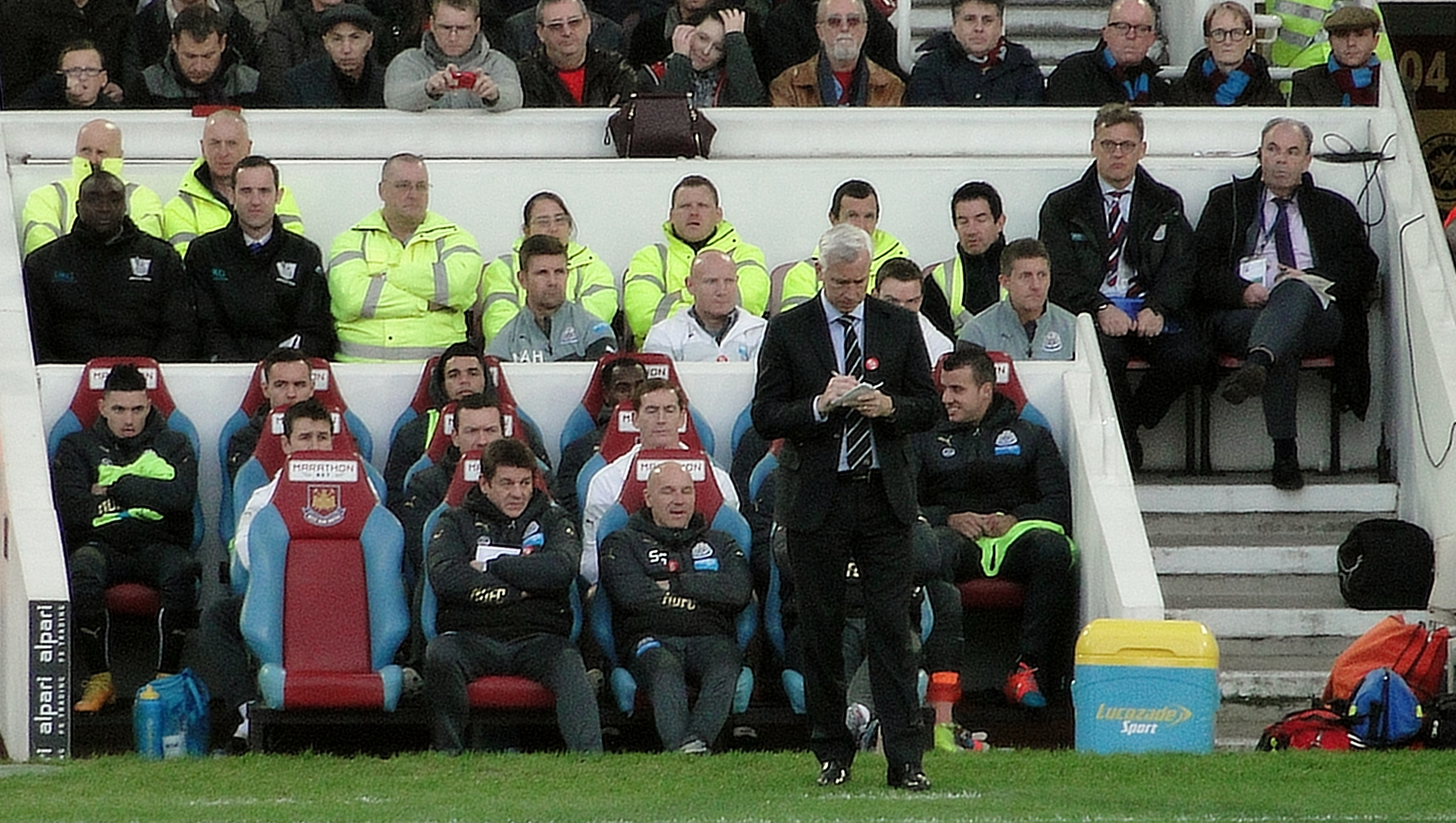
Pardew (front, standing) as manager of Newcastle United in 2014

On 6 December 2010, Chris Hughton was dismissed as manager of Newcastle United. Three days later, the club confirmed Pardew as the club's new manager on a five-and-a-half-year contract. Sky Sports reported that, of 40,000 fans taking part in a poll on who should become the next manager, Pardew only received the backing of 5.5% of voters.

Pardew stated: "I'm not a Geordie of course, but I'm a football person with a love of the game and I can assure you I bring great drive, desire and commitment to the job. Chris Hughton did a great job last season, guiding the club back to the Premier League, and he continued that good work this season. It is my aim to build on that now and take this club forward." He acknowledged that he would face a battle to win over players and supporters, and that other managers had texted him to say "you must be mad going there", but he declared, "It's one of the top five clubs in England. It's a daunting prospect but something I couldn't turn down."

In his first game in charge, Pardew led Newcastle to a 3–1 win over Liverpool at St James' Park on 11 December 2010, with goals from Kevin Nolan, Joey Barton and Andy Carroll. In the club's first home match of 2011, he achieved a notable 5–0 victory over his former club West Ham. He brought in his own coaching staff in the form of John Carver as assistant manager, who had worked as assistant to Sir Bobby Robson six years earlier. Andy Woodman was also Pardew's appointment as goalkeeping coach. Soon after, however, Pardew suffered one of the biggest upsets in the club's history as Newcastle went down 3–1 to League Two side Stevenage in the third round of the FA Cup.

The following month, however, Pardew led the Magpies to a 4–4 draw with Arsenal in a match at St James' Park on 5 February 2011. Newcastle were 4–0 down at half-time, only to come back to level the match. This has been seen as one of the most remarkable comebacks in Premier League history. He secured Newcastle's safety in the Premier League with a 2–1 win over Birmingham City on 7 May 2011, with the club in mid-table. This result was followed by a 2–2 draw at Chelsea and a 3–3 draw against West Bromwich Albion at St James' Park. In this match, however, they let a 3–0 goal lead slip, meaning they would finish outside the top ten in 12th place.

In the summer of 2011, Pardew brought many French-speaking players to the club, including Yohan Cabaye, Sylvain Marveaux and Demba Ba. At the start of the 2011–12 season, Pardew led Newcastle to their best start to a Premier League campaign in 17 years, with an unbeaten run of eleven matches in all competitions.

In January 2012, Pardew signed striker Papiss Cissé from Bundesliga club Freiburg. This was another pivotal signing in the resurgence of Newcastle, as he scored 13 goals in twelve games.

Two days prior to the final match of the season, Pardew won the Premier League Manager of the Season award, becoming the first Newcastle manager to achieve this. He was given the award after an impressive season with Newcastle, where he guided them to a European place for the following season. He also won the League Managers Association Manager of the Year award, which made him the first and only English manager to win the two individual awards in a single Premier League season. On 27 September 2012, Pardew signed an eight-year contract extension with the club.

During the 2013 January transfer window, Pardew signed a number of players from the French Ligue 1 – including internationals such as Mapou Yanga-Mbiwa, Mathieu Debuchy and Moussa Sissoko – to help boost Newcastle's chances. The new signings helped Pardew to guide Newcastle to their first European quarter-final in eight years, as they defeated Russian side Anzhi Makhachkala 1–0 on aggregate. On 14 April 2013, Pardew's Newcastle side lost 3–0 to Sunderland at St James' Park, Newcastle's biggest home defeat to Sunderland since Bill McGarry's side lost 4–1 in February 1979. On 6 December 2013, Pardew was awarded the November Premier League Manager of the Month award, after guiding Newcastle to four wins out of four. He followed this up with the club's first win at Old Trafford in 41 years, defeating Manchester United 0–1 on 7 December 2013.

Newcastle's form since the turn of the year into the end of season 2013–14 was described by the regional press as "a total collapse", with the club losing 15 of 21 competitive fixtures. Fans' discontent boiled over in the final home match of the season on 3 May, when Pardew (and club owner Ashley) received vocal and sustained abuse from the stands despite a 3–0 victory over Cardiff City. The Chronicle newspaper commented: "This was arguably the worst personal abuse a Newcastle manager has had to endure at any game. It was an excruciating afternoon for all concerned." Despite this, he retained the trust of owner Mike Ashley, with the press, including the Chronicle, reporting that he would be given a chance to rebuild the side for the 2014–15 season. In September 2014, with the club in bottom place in the Premier League, some fans created a website, Sackpardew.com, to instigate his dismissal. Protests were also planned before a game against Hull City, which included the printing of 30,000 A4 sheets calling for his dismissal. In November 2014, Pardew guided Newcastle to six consecutive wins in all competitions, the second time he had done so during his time as manager at the club. On 6 December 2014, Pardew's side ended Chelsea's unbeaten start to the season in all competitions, as Newcastle beat them 2–1 at St James' Park. On 12 December 2014, Pardew was awarded the Premier League Manager of the Month award for November 2014.

On 29 December 2014, after the dismissal of Neil Warnock, Pardew was given permission to talk to Crystal Palace on the club's managerial vacancy, with compensation agreed. A day later, John Carver assumed first-team managerial duties, with Pardew absent from training.

=== Crystal Palace ===
On 3 January 2015, Pardew was confirmed as the new Crystal Palace manager, signing a three-and-a-half-year contract with the club after a compensation package of £3.5 million was agreed. Two days later, in his first match in charge, Palace won 4–0 away to Conference club Dover Athletic in the third round of the FA Cup. His first league match in charge was a 2–1 home win against Tottenham Hotspur. Crystal Palace continued in fine form under Pardew with two successive wins, including a 3–2 victory over Southampton to advance into the fifth round of the FA Cup. His first defeat in charge was a 0–1 home loss to Everton on 31 January 2015. Pardew went on to guide Crystal Palace to their best ever Premier League finish of tenth place. The Daily Mirror reported that Pardew was the first manager to take over a Premier League club in the relegation zone and eventually guide them to a top half finish; and that "Pardew has a legitimate claim to keeping two teams up this campaign" with Newcastle "staying up on the final day of the season – surviving really only on their early season form".

The 2015–16 season started well for Pardew – wins over teams such as Chelsea, Aston Villa and Liverpool meant there was talk of a UEFA Europa League spot early in the campaign. After 19 games, the season's midpoint, Palace sat in fifth position in the Premier League, and looked well positioned to challenge for said European spot going into the New Year of 2016.

However, this target would ultimately not be reached, as Palace made a dismal start to 2016. They embarked on a 14-game winless run, which came to a halt with a 1–0 win over Norwich City. They would only win one other league game throughout the entire season – a 2–1 home victory over Stoke City on the penultimate match day of the season, enough to keep the club in the division by finishing 15th. Despite the poor league form, Pardew and his team qualified for the 2015–16 FA Cup final after a 2–1 win over Watford, thanks to goals from Yannick Bolasie and Connor Wickham. They subsequently lost the cup final 2–1 to Manchester United.

After a poor start to the 2016–17 season, and poor results overall in the 2016 calendar year, Pardew was dismissed as manager on 22 December 2016; Palace had won only six matches of 36 played in 2016. They had won one in eleven, and were placed 17th in the Premier League table at the time of his dismissal. Palace chairman Steve Parish said Pardew's "expansive style of football hasn't worked", and, "Now we're going to wind the dial back the other way".

=== West Bromwich Albion ===
On 29 November 2017, Pardew was appointed as the new manager of Premier League club West Bromwich Albion, replacing the dismissed Tony Pulis, signing a contract lasting until the end of the 2019–20 season. "I'm thrilled with the opportunity to work with a talented group", he said. "The immediate challenge will be to get the results we need to pull ourselves up the table. But I'm aware that while I'm joining one of the great, traditional clubs of English football, it is one determined to go forward in the Premier League." John Carver joined the coaching staff as assistant manager, having previously worked under Pardew at Newcastle United. In his debut game in charge, the club drew 0–0 at The Hawthorns, against his previous club Crystal Palace.

On 2 April 2018, West Bromwich Albion and Pardew mutually parted company after he had been manager for four months. At the time, Albion had gone ten games without a win, were on a run of eight successive defeats and were bottom of the Premier League.

=== ADO Den Haag ===
On 24 December 2019, Pardew was announced as the new head coach of ADO Den Haag of the Dutch Eredivisie, signing a contract until the end of the 2019–20 season. He took charge of eight league games, winning one, before play was halted in the Netherlands on 12 March due to the 2020 coronavirus pandemic. Den Haag were seven points from safety in the 2019–20 Eredivisie before the season was cancelled with no relegation. Amidst reports that he was due a £100,000 bonus for avoiding relegation, he said: "In this difficult period, I would always return any bonus to the club, which will certainly find a good destination for it". He left the club on 28 April 2020 after both parties mutually agreed to not extend his contract beyond the end of the season.

=== CSKA Sofia ===
On 23 November 2020, he was appointed аdviser on football matters, to the owners of CSKA Sofia. In April 2022, Pardew took charge of the first team following the resignation of the manager Stoycho Mladenov. His debut game as manager was a 0–0 home draw in the First League against Levski Sofia on 17 April. Pardew lost his second league game, against Ludogorets Razgrad by a score of 5–0, marking the biggest defeat for CSKA in the season. CSKA Sofia were also defeated in the Bulgarian Cup Final by archrivals Levski Sofia.

On 1 June 2022, Pardew left CSKA as manager and technical director after bananas were thrown towards CSKA's black players by their own supporters. His assistant, Alex Dyer, who is black, also left.

=== Aris Thessaloniki ===
On 14 September 2022, Pardew was appointed as the new manager of Greek Super League club Aris Thessaloniki, replacing Germán Burgos. He signed a one-year contract with the option to extend for a further year. He left the club on 23 February 2023 by mutual consent.

== Public image ==
- In September 2003, Pardew resigned from Reading after being refused permission to become manager at West Ham. Reading's chairman John Madejski attempted to create an injunction in the High Court to prevent him from moving to West Ham. Eventually Reading's legal action was dropped, and Pardew joined West Ham after a period of gardening leave.
- In March 2006, Pardew had a dispute with Arsenal manager Arsène Wenger, after he criticised Arsenal for failing to field an English player in their UEFA Champions League win against Real Madrid. Wenger suggested that Pardew was being xenophobic, a claim Pardew denied, citing his marriage to a Swedish woman.
- In November 2006, Pardew had another dispute with Wenger after celebrating West Ham's win over Arsenal. Wenger claimed he was provoked into pushing Pardew after Pardew's celebrations at West Ham's late win. Wenger also refused to shake Pardew's hand at the final whistle, as is customary. Wenger was later fined by the FA, while Pardew was cleared of the charges in January 2007.
- In October 2007, Pardew intervened on the pitch in a match against Hull City to try to break up a confrontation between Charlton and Hull players after Lloyd Sam and Ian Ashbee were sent-off. Pardew denied he made the situation worse by intervening.
- In March 2009, Pardew stated on Match of the Day 2 that Chelsea midfielder Michael Essien "absolutely rapes" Manchester City player Ched Evans during a midfield tussle for the ball, in the sense that he bested him physically. The BBC explained why there was no on-air apology, saying: "What Alan Pardew said was misheard, it was thought he used the word 'rakes.'".
- On the opening day of the 2012–13 Premier League season against Tottenham Hotspur, Pardew pushed an official after an incident in which the ball appeared to go over the touchline, but the referee deemed it to still be in play. Pardew later apologised, citing his behaviour as "ridiculous".
- In January 2014, during the Premier League match against Manchester City, Pardew verbally abused opposition manager Manuel Pellegrini. Pellegrini initially confronted Pardew on the touchline and accused Pardew of frivolously contesting every decision by the referee and was trying to dishonestly deceive the officials even when it was an obvious decision in City's favour. After the initial skirmish, Pardew was caught on Sky Sports television cameras calling Pellegrini "a fucking old cunt". Pardew later apologised only after being confronted by journalists about his abusive language. Pellegrini shrugged off the incident but said he disagreed with Pardew's approach to contesting every decision by the referee.
- In March 2014, Pardew was sent to the stands after headbutting Hull City player David Meyler. The ball went out of play near Pardew and Meyler pushed past him to quickly resume play, at which point Pardew headbutted Meyler. Although Pardew apologised for his actions, he was fined £100,000 by Newcastle United and given a formal warning. On 11 March, the FA handed Pardew a three-game stadium ban with a touchline ban for a further four games. He was also fined £60,000 by the FA, in addition to the £100,000 fine from Newcastle United.

== Personal life ==
Pardew is married to a Swedish woman, Tina. The couple have two daughters.

== Career statistics ==
=== Player ===
Appearances and goals by club, season and competition
Club	Season	League			FA Cup		League Cup		Other		Total	
Club	Season	Division	Apps	Goals	Apps	Goals	Apps	Goals	Apps	Goals	Apps	Goals
Crystal Palace	1987–88	Second Division	20	0	1	0	2	0	1 (Note: Appearances in Full Members' Cup)	0	24	0
Crystal Palace	1988–89	Second Division	45	1	0	0	3	1	9 (Note: Five Appearances in Full Members' Cup and four in Football League play-offs)	1	57	2
Crystal Palace	1989–90	First Division	36	6	6	1	4	0	5	1	51	8
Crystal Palace	1990–91	First Division	19	1	1	0	2	0	5	0	27	1
Crystal Palace	1991–92	First Division	8	0	0	0	1	0	0	0	9	0
Crystal Palace	Total		128	8	8	1	12	1	20	2	168	12
Charlton Athletic	1991–92	Second Division	24	2	2	0	0	0	0	0	26	2
Charlton Athletic	1992–93	First Division	30	9	1	0	2	0	2 (Note: Appearances in Anglo-Italian Cup)	1	34	10
Charlton Athletic	1993–94	First Division	26	10	6	1	2	0	4	0	38	11
Charlton Athletic	1994–95	First Division	24	3	1	0	0	0	0	0	25	3
Charlton Athletic	Total		104	24	10	1	4	0	6	1	124	26
Tottenham Hotspur (loan)	1995–96	Premier League	0	0	0	0	0	0	4 (Note: Appearances in UEFA Intertoto Cup)	0	4	0
Barnet	1995–96	Third Division	41	0	2	0	2	0	2 (Note: Appearances in Football League Trophy)	0	47	0
Barnet	1995–96	Third Division	26	0	1	0	4	0	1	0	32	0
Barnet	Total		67	0	3	0	6	0	3	0	79	0
Career total			299	32	21	2	22	1	33	3	375	38

=== Manager ===
As of match played 12 February 2023

Managerial record by team and tenure
Team	Nat	From	To	Record					Ref
Team	Nat	From	To	P	W	D	L	Win %	Ref
Reading (caretaker)	(England)	18 March 1998	25 March 1998	1	0	0	1	0.0	
Reading	(England)	13 October 1999	10 September 2003	211	102	52	57	48.3	
West Ham United	(England)	20 October 2003	11 December 2006	163	67	38	58	41.1	
Charlton Athletic	(England)	24 December 2006	22 November 2008	90	28	26	36	31.1	
Southampton	(England)	17 July 2009	30 August 2010	64	34	17	13	53.1	
Newcastle United	(England)	9 December 2010	30 December 2014	185	71	41	73	38.4	
Crystal Palace	(England)	3 January 2015	22 December 2016	87	35	13	39	40.2	
West Bromwich Albion	(England)	29 November 2017	2 April 2018	21	3	5	13	14.3	
ADO Den Haag	(Netherlands)	24 December 2019	28 April 2020	8	1	3	4	12.5	
CSKA Sofia	(Bulgaria)	15 April 2022	1 June 2022	7	1	3	3	14.3	
Aris	(Greece)	14 September 2022	23 February 2023	22	9	3	10	40.9	
Total				859	351	201	307	40.9	

== Honours ==
=== Player ===
Crystal Palace

- Football League Second Division play-offs: 1989
- Full Members' Cup: 1990–91
- FA Cup runner-up: 1989–90

=== Manager ===
Reading

- Football League Second Division runner-up: 2001–02

West Ham United

- Football League Championship play-offs: 2005
- FA Cup runner-up: 2005–06

Southampton

- Football League Trophy: 2009–10

Crystal Palace

- FA Cup runner-up: 2015–16

CSKA Sofia

- Bulgarian Cup runner-up: 2021–22

Individual

- Premier League Manager of the Season: 2011–12
- LMA Manager of the Year: 2011–12
- Premier League Manager of the Month: February 2006, November 2013, November 2014
