= Scott Minto =

English footballer

Personal information
- Full name: Scott Christopher Minto
- Date of birth: 6 August 1971 (age 55)
- Place of birth: Bromborough, England
- Height: 5 ft 10 in (1.78 m)
- Position: Left back

Youth career
- –1988: Charlton Athletic

Senior career*
| Years | Team | Apps | (Gls) |
| 1988–1994 | Charlton Athletic | 180 | (7) |
| 1994–1997 | Chelsea | 54 | (4) |
| 1997–1999 | Benfica | 31 | (0) |
| 1999–2003 | West Ham United | 51 | (0) |
| 2003–2006 | Rotherham United | 52 | (0) |
| Total | | 368 | (11) |

International career
| 1990–1993 | England U21 | 6 | (0) |
- * Club domestic league appearances and goals

Scott Christopher Minto (born 6 August 1971) is an English former professional footballer and sports television pundit.

As a player he was a left back who played in the Premier League for Chelsea and West Ham United and in Portugal for Benfica. He also played in the Football League for Charlton Athletic and Rotherham United and was capped six times by England U21.

Since retirement, Minto has worked as a pundit and occasional co-commentator, notably with Sky Sports and Talksport.

== Playing career ==
Minto started his career with Charlton Athletic and made his debut as a 17-year-old in 1988. After over 220 appearances for the Addicks, he moved across London to sign for Chelsea in July 1994 for £875,000.

Minto made his debut for Chelsea in a 6–2 Cup Winners' Cup win against Czech side FK Viktoria Žižkov, and played in every round of the side's run to the semi-finals. His time at Chelsea was plagued by injuries, but he was nevertheless a regular member of the Chelsea defence when fit. In 1996–97, he was an important part of the side's run to the 1997 FA Cup Final, which they won, defeating Middlesbrough 2–0 in what proved to be his last game for the club. He scored five goals in 72 appearances for Chelsea, all of which came in his final season.

In June 1997, shortly after Chelsea's FA Cup win, Minto joined Benfica of Portugal on a free transfer. He remained in Lisbon for 18 months, making 31 appearances, before returning to England with West Ham United for £1,000,000 in January 1999.

His West Ham career got off to a poor start, losing 4–0 at home to Sheffield Wednesday, but he quickly established himself in the side, as the club secured 5th place in the league – their highest ever Premier League finish. However, his time there was again plagued by injury problems and he was released by the club upon the expiry of his contract in June 2003. He played in 51 league games for West Ham, without scoring.

Minto then joined League One side Rotherham United, but once again injuries hindered his progress and he made just seven league appearances during the 2005–06 season. He announced his retirement from the game in July 2006.

== Media career ==
Minto presented Revista de la Liga and live coverage of Spanish football on Sky Sports until 2015, when he started presenting live coverage of the English Football League as the deputy lead presenter behind Simon Thomas. When Thomas was promoted to present Premier League football on Saturday lunch times following the departure of Ed Chamberlin to ITV Racing, Minto became the lead English Football League presenter in August 2016. He regularly presents games on Friday evenings, Sunday lunch times and Monday nights, and anchors Sky's coverage of the end of season play-off games. Prior to his presenting work, Minto occasionally made appearances commenting on games from the studio for Soccer Saturday. Minto was replaced on Sky in 2020. He previously appeared on Talksport's Evening Kick-off show as a co-presenter. Other previous work as a pundit included working for BBC London 94.9's live football commentaries. Minto currently hosts Charlton TV Live, the official Charlton livestream service, on matchdays.

== Personal life ==
In 2008, Minto graduated from University of Staffordshire with a degree in Professional Sports Writing and Broadcasting.

== Career statistics ==
Appearances and goals by club, season and competition
| Club | Season | League | | | National cup (Note: Includes FA Cup, Taça de Portugal) | | League cup (Note: Includes Football League Cup) | | Other | | Total | |
| Club | Season | Division | Apps | Goals | Apps | Goals | Apps | Goals | Apps | Goals | Apps | Goals |
|---|---|---|---|---|---|---|---|---|---|---|---|---|
| Charlton Athletic | 1988–89 | First Division | 3 | 0 | 0 | 0 | 0 | 0 | 1 (Note: Appearance(s) in Full Members' Cup) | 0 | 4 | 0 |
| Charlton Athletic | 1989–90 | First Division | 23 | 2 | 1 | 0 | 0 | 0 | 2 | 1 | 26 | 3 |
| Charlton Athletic | 1990–91 | Second Division | 43 | 1 | 1 | 0 | 1 | 1 | 1 | 0 | 46 | 2 |
| Charlton Athletic | 1991–92 | Second Division | 33 | 1 | 1 | 0 | 3 | 1 | 0 | 0 | 37 | 2 |
| Charlton Athletic | 1992–93 | First Division | 36 | 1 | 1 | 0 | 2 | 0 | 2 (Note: Appearance(s) in Anglo-Italian Cup) | 0 | 41 | 1 |
| Charlton Athletic | 1993–94 | First Division | 42 | 2 | 6 | 0 | 2 | 0 | 1 | 0 | 51 | 2 |
| Charlton Athletic | Total | | 180 | 7 | 10 | 0 | 8 | 2 | 7 | 1 | 205 | 10 |
| Chelsea | 1994–95 | Premier League | 19 | 0 | 3 | 0 | 0 | 0 | 6 (Note: Appearances in UEFA Cup Winners' Cup) | 0 | 28 | 0 |
| Chelsea | 1995–96 | Premier League | 10 | 0 | 0 | 0 | 1 | 0 | — | | 11 | 0 |
| Chelsea | 1996–97 | Premier League | 25 | 4 | 6 | 0 | 2 | 1 | — | | 33 | 5 |
| Chelsea | Total | | 54 | 4 | 9 | 0 | 3 | 1 | 6 | 0 | 72 | 5 |
| Benfica | 1997–98 | Primeira Divisão | 21 | 0 | 4 | 0 | — | | 0 | 0 | 25 | 0 |
| Benfica | 1998–99 | Primeira Divisão | 10 | 0 | 1 | 0 | — | | 6 (Note: Appearances in UEFA Champions League) | 0 | 17 | 0 |
| Benfica | Total | | 31 | 0 | 5 | 0 | — | | 6 | 0 | 42 | 0 |
| West Ham United | 1998–99 | Premier League | 15 | 0 | 0 | 0 | 0 | 0 | — | | 15 | 0 |
| West Ham United | 1999–2000 | Premier League | 18 | 0 | 1 | 0 | 1 | 0 | 5 (Note: Appearances in UEFA Intertoto Cup) | 0 | 25 | 0 |
| West Ham United | 2000–01 | Premier League | 1 | 0 | 0 | 0 | 0 | 0 | — | | 1 | 0 |
| West Ham United | 2001–02 | Premier League | 5 | 0 | 0 | 0 | 1 | 0 | — | | 6 | 0 |
| West Ham United | 2002–03 | Premier League | 12 | 0 | 1 | 0 | 2 | 0 | — | | 15 | 0 |
| West Ham United | Total | | 51 | 0 | 2 | 0 | 4 | 0 | 5 | 0 | 62 | 0 |
| Rotherham United | 2003–04 | First Division | 32 | 0 | 1 | 0 | 2 | 0 | — | | 35 | 0 |
| Rotherham United | 2004–05 | Championship | 14 | 0 | 0 | 0 | 2 | 0 | — | | 16 | 0 |
| Rotherham United | 2005–06 | League One | 6 | 0 | 0 | 0 | 0 | 0 | 1 (Note: Appearance in Football League Trophy) | 0 | 7 | 0 |
| Rotherham United | Total | | 52 | 0 | 1 | 0 | 4 | 0 | 1 | 0 | 58 | 0 |
| Career total | | | 368 | 11 | 27 | 0 | 19 | 3 | 25 | 1 | 439 | 15 |

== Honours ==
Chelsea

- FA Cup: 1996–97

Individual

- PFA Team of the Year: 1993–94 First Division
