= Redstone fm =

Redstone FM
- Redhill, Surrey; England
- Broadcast area: Surrey, Crawley, South London
- Frequency: DAB 10C
- Branding: Your Digital Choice

Programming
- Language: English
- Format: Adult Contemporary (AC)

Ownership
- Owner: Membership

History
- First air date: 16 December 2013

Links
- Website: Redstone FM

Redstone FM was an English DAB-only radio station covering most of the region encompassing Surrey, Sussex, Crawley and South London, principally focused on Croydon.

Based in Redhill, the station went on the air on 16 December 2013. Broadcasting ceased in September 2015.

== History ==
Redstone FM was created in 2005. It ran six short-term restricted service licenses on FM radio, which served the towns of Redhill and Reigate.

Set up as a community group, the not-for-profit company applied for a community radio license in 2011, but lost out to Susy Radio 103.4.

Its parent company MuxCo Surrey & Sussex Ltd shut them down for unspecified reasons. Although Redstone FM is not mentioned, Ofcom’s head of Spectrum Enforcement, Clive Corrie, told The Guardian in 2015 that stations were often shut down because they "interfere with vital radio communications used by the emergency services and aircraft systems, and frequently cause damage to property".

== Management ==
- Chairman - Rosie Mac
- Chief Executive - Des Shepherd
- Program Director - Steve Burge
- Finance Director - Nigel Peacock
- Speech Content - Johny Cassisy
- Volunteer Co-ordinator - Tess Lewsey
