= Rob Lee =

English footballer (born 1966)

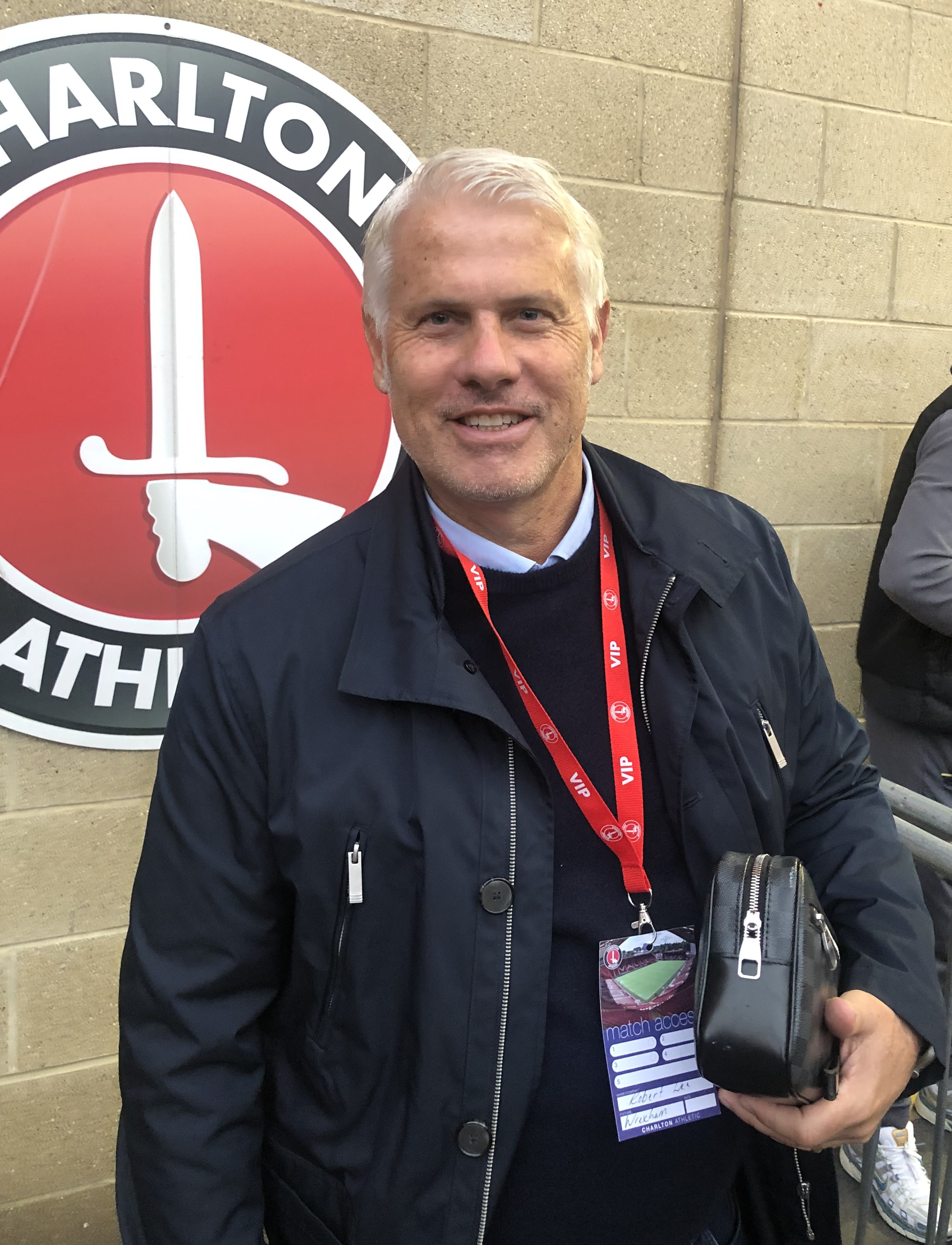
- Lee in 2024

Personal information
- Full name: Robert Martin Lee
- Date of birth: 1 February 1966 (age 60)
- Place of birth: West Ham, England
- Height: 5 ft 10 in (1.78 m)
- Position: Midfielder

Youth career
- –1981: Hornchurch
- 1981–1983: Charlton Athletic

Senior career*
Years	Team	Apps	(Gls)
1983–1992	Charlton Athletic	298	(59)
1992–2002	Newcastle United	303	(44)
2002–2003	Derby County	48	(2)
2003–2004	West Ham United	16	(0)
2004	Oldham Athletic	0	(0)
2005–2006	Wycombe Wanderers	38	(0)
Total		703	(105)

International career
1986	England U21	2	(0)
1994	England B	1	(0)
1994–1998	England	21	(2)
- * Club domestic league appearances and goals

Robert Martin Lee (born 1 February 1966) is an English former professional footballer and sports co-commentator.

As a player, he was a midfielder who notably played in the Premier League for Newcastle United and West Ham United. His time at St James Park saw him win the Football League First Division in 1993. He also played in the Football League for Charlton Athletic, Derby County, Oldham Athletic and Wycombe Wanderers. He was capped 21 times by England, scoring twice and was a member of the 1998 FIFA World Cup squad.

Following retirement, he harboured interests of becoming a manager and in 2006 he was interviewed for the vacant AFC Bournemouth job, but ultimately has worked away from the sport with a stint as co-commentator for TEN Sports. He was inducted into the Newcastle United Hall of Fame in 2019.

== Club career ==
=== Charlton Athletic ===
Lee started his career in the youth team of Hornchurch and actually played for the first team at the age of 15 in a pre-season friendly under manager, Brian Kelly. Hornchurch wanted Lee to sign a contract with them but he was offered an academy place at Charlton Athletic and established himself in the first team by the 1984–85 season, when he scored 10 goals in the Second Division. He rapidly became the Addicks' star player playing as a winger and helping Charlton to promotion to the First Division at the end of the 1985–86 season and gained international recognition at under-21 level. He remained a regular in the top flight over the next four years until Charlton were relegated back to the Second Division at the end of the 1989–90 season.

Lee remained with Charlton for more than two years after relegation, but he was sold shortly after the start of 1992–93 season as the club needed money to finance its return to The Valley. At the time, Charlton were second in the table, and Lee moved to the league leaders, Newcastle United, for a fee of £700,000. He moved to Newcastle after their manager, Kevin Keegan, told him that Newcastle upon Tyne was closer to London than Middlesbrough, the other club interested in signing Lee, and who were already in the Premier League.

=== Newcastle United ===
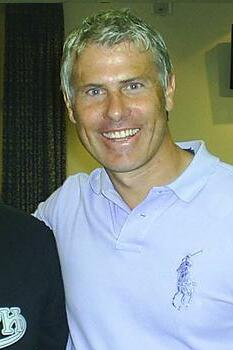
Lee in 2007.

Lee who also has ancestral ties to the North East, having relatives who marched in the Jarrow March, signed for Newcastle in 1992. Despite his North East connections, Lee noted it was his childhood footballing hero Kevin Keegan who influenced him to move to Newcastle United. Keegan also promised Lee that if he moved to Newcastle United he would play for England. Newcastle player Gavin Peacock had first alerted Keegan to the ability of Lee. In passing a comment, Peacock stated to Keegan that there is a player from Charlton who could play at the highest level.

Lee made his Newcastle debut as a substitute in a 1–0 win over Peterborough United. Newcastle were promoted to the Premier League at the end of the season, with Lee scoring 10 goals from 36 matches. Newcastle's first season back in the top division for four years ended well, as they finished third and qualified for the UEFA Cup, although it was top scorer Andy Cole rather than Lee who made the most headlines at the club during this campaign. In the first round against Royal Antwerp Lee scored a hat-trick as Newcastle won 5–0 in Belgium in their first European game for 17 years.

Lee finished the 1994–95 season with nine goals from 35 matches as Newcastle finished sixth in the table, although they had topped the league early in the season after winning their first six games.

Manager Kevin Keegan refreshed the side over the summer of 1995, shelling out nearly £9million on David Ginola and Les Ferdinand, and allowing Lee a more attacking role. He won the Premier League player of the month for November 1995 as Newcastle built up a wide lead at the top of the league and looked increasingly capable of winning their first top division title since 1927. Newcastle finished the season in second place, after being 10 points ahead of Christmas and remaining top until March, but Lee was named in the PFA Team of the Year for the 1995–96 season. Rob Lee's favourite shirt he wore in his career was the Newcastle United away shirt from that season; "It was great for me, because I was from London and supported West Ham. I was playing for a great club in Newcastle but wearing West Ham colours!".

After Keegan's shock resignation in January 1997, Kenny Dalglish was named manager, and he made Lee captain as Newcastle again finished runners-up to Manchester United in the Premier League. After Dalglish's sacking early in the 1998–99 season, Ruud Gullit was named Newcastle manager. After a good start, Gullit tried to quickly discard Lee, as well as Stuart Pearce and John Barnes, forcing them to train with the reserves.. For the start of the 1999–2000 season, Lee was not given a squad number by Gullit, and after Gullit had dropped Alan Shearer for the Tyne-Wear derby defeat against Sunderland, he resigned and was succeeded by the former England manager Bobby Robson.

Robson put Lee and fellow midfielder Gary Speed (signed in February 1998) back in the heart of Newcastle's midfield. Lee scored in the FA Cup semi-final against Chelsea, but Newcastle lost 2–1. Lee was awarded a testimonial in 2001, nine years after joining the club, and a crowd of 18,189 turned out as Spanish side Athletic Bilbao won 1–0 at St James' Park. Lee's last goal for Newcastle came in a 4–3 win over Manchester United in 2001.

On 7 February 2002, with Newcastle outsiders in the title race for the first time in five seasons, Lee called time on almost 10 years on Tyneside to join struggling Derby County for a transfer fee of £250,000, signing for the club just eight days after John Gregory was appointed as manager.

=== Later career ===
Following a short, unsuccessful spell with Derby, which saw them relegated from the Premier League, Lee was sold to West Ham United in 2003, after scoring twice in games against Reading and Ipswich Town. However, he played only a handful of games for the Hammers during the 2003–04 season. Following this, he signed for Oldham Athletic on a free transfer, playing just the 1 game, leaving the club within a month. Following this he was signed by former Arsenal and England captain Tony Adams, to help Wycombe Wanderers climb out of the newly named League Two. He played two seasons in League Two with the Chairboys, before leaving in June 2006, following the dismissal of John Gorman as the club's manager. This took him past his 40th birthday, and he was among the oldest players still playing professional football in England by the time of his last game.

== International career ==
Lee played for England between 1994 and 1998, scoring twice in 21 appearances. He was called up for the first time for a friendly against the USA in September 1994, and scored on his début the following month against Romania. He was in the squad for the 1998 World Cup under Glenn Hoddle, and came on once as a substitute against Colombia. He had been surprisingly omitted from the England squad for UEFA Euro 1996 under Terry Venables despite being in arguably better form in 1996 than two years later.

== Post-playing career ==
In October 2006, Lee was interviewed for the manager position at AFC Bournemouth, but the job went to Kevin Bond. Lee was arrested in July 2007, alongside former teammate Warren Barton, for taking a limousine but was not charged. He also appeared for Newcastle on the charity television show Premier League All Stars in September 2007.

In May 2008, he captained Legal & General to victory in a charity five-a-side tournament in St Albans, helping to raise £15,000 for the leukaemia charity the Anthony Nolan Trust.

In 2008, he worked as a regular pundit for Singapore's Football Channel. In 2010 he was also backup commentator alongside John Burridge for TEN Sports' UEFA Champions League fixtures.

On 5 November 2019, Lee was inducted into the Newcastle United Hall of Fame.

In 2019 and 2020, Lee featured in both seasons of ITV show Harry's Heroes, which featured former football manager Harry Redknapp attempting to get a squad of former England international footballers back fit and healthy for a game against Germany legends.

On 10 June 2026, Hornchurch unveiled Lee as their new director of football.

== Personal life ==
Lee is married to his wife, Anna. The couple have three children, Olly and Elliot, both of whom are also footballers, and one daughter Megan.

== Career statistics ==
=== Club ===
Appearances and goals by club, season and competition
Club	Season	League			FA Cup		League Cup		Europe		Other		Total	
Club	Season	Division	Apps	Goals	Apps	Goals	Apps	Goals	Apps	Goals	Apps	Goals	Apps	Goals
Charlton Athletic	1983–84	Second Division	11	4	0	0	0	0	—		—		11	4
Charlton Athletic	1984–85	Second Division	39	10	2	0	2	0	—		—		43	10
Charlton Athletic	1985–86	Second Division	35	8	1	0	2	0	—		1 (Note: Appearance in Full Members' Cup)	0	39	8
Charlton Athletic	1986–87	First Division	33	3	0	0	3	1	—		7 (Note: Five appearances and three goals in Full Members' Cup, two in Second Division play-offs)	3	43	7
Charlton Athletic	1987–88	First Division	23	2	1	0	3	0	—		1	0	28	2
Charlton Athletic	1988–89	First Division	31	5	3	1	1	0	—		1	0	36	6
Charlton Athletic	1989–90	First Division	37	1	3	1	3	0	—		1	0	44	2
Charlton Athletic	1990–91	Second Division	43	13	1	0	2	0	—		0	0	46	13
Charlton Athletic	1991–92	Second Division	39	12	3	0	3	0	—		0	0	45	12
Charlton Athletic	1992–93	First Division	7	1	—		—		—		1 (Note: Appearance in Anglo-Italian Cup)	0	8	1
Charlton Athletic	Total		298	59	14	2	19	1	—		12	3	343	65
Newcastle United	1992–93	First Division	36	10	4	2	3	1	—		—		43	13
Newcastle United	1993–94	Premier League	41	7	3	0	3	1	—		—		47	8
Newcastle United	1994–95	Premier League	35	9	4	1	2	0	3 (Note: Appearances in UEFA Cup)	4	—		44	14
Newcastle United	1995–96	Premier League	36	8	1	0	4	1	—		—		41	9
Newcastle United	1996–97	Premier League	33	5	2	1	1	0	8	0	1 (Note: Appearance in FA Charity Shield)	0	45	6
Newcastle United	1997–98	Premier League	28	4	6	0	2	0	6 (Note: Appearances in UEFA Champions League)	0	—		42	4
Newcastle United	1998–99	Premier League	26	0	3	0	0	0	1 (Note: Appearance in UEFA Cup Winners' Cup)	0	—		30	0
Newcastle United	1999–2000	Premier League	30	0	4	1	1	0	6	0	—		41	1
Newcastle United	2000–01	Premier League	22	0	0	0	4	0	—		—		26	0
Newcastle United	2001–02	Premier League	16	1	0	0	3	0	3 (Note: Appearances in UEFA Intertoto Cup)	0	—		22	1
Newcastle United	Total		303	44	27	5	23	3	27	4	1	0	381	56
Derby County	2001–02	Premier League	13	0	—		—		—		—		13	0
Derby County	2002–03	First Division	35	2	0	0	2	0	—		—		37	2
Derby County	Total		48	2	0	0	2	0	—		—		50	2
West Ham United	2003–04	First Division	16	0	1	0	2	0	—		0	0	19	0
Oldham Athletic	2004–05	League One	0	0	0	0	—		—		1 (Note: Appearance in Football League Trophy)	0	1	0
Wycombe Wanderers	2004–05	League Two	7	0	—		—		—		—		7	0
Wycombe Wanderers	2005–06	League Two	31	0	1	0	1	0	—		3 (Note: One appearance in Football League Trophy, two in League Two play-offs)	0	36	0
Wycombe Wanderers	Total		38	0	1	0	1	0	—		3	0	43	0
Career total			703	105	43	7	47	4	27	4	17	3	837	123

== Honours ==
Charlton Athletic

- Full Members' Cup runner-up: 1986–87

Newcastle United

- Football League First Division: 1992–93
- FA Cup runner-up: 1997–98, 1998–99

England

- Tournoi de France: 1997

Individual

- Premier League Player of the Month: September 1994, November 1995
- PFA Team of the Year: 1995–96 Premier League

== Sources ==
- Bolam, Mike (2012). The Newcastle Miscellany. United Kingdom: Vision Sports Publishing. ISBN 978-1-907637-74-2.
- Keegan, Kevin (4 October 2018). Keegan, Kevin. My Life in Football: The Autobiography. United Kingdom: Pan Macmillan. ISBN 978-1509877201.
