= Danny Warden =

English footballer

Personal information
- Date of birth: 11 April 1973 (age 53)
- Place of birth: Stepney, England
- Position: Midfielder

Senior career*
Years	Team	Apps	(Gls)
1992–1993	Charlton Athletic	3	(0)
- * Club domestic league appearances and goals

Daniel Warden (born 11 April 1973) is an English former professional footballer who played as a midfielder in the Football League.
