= Paul Sturgess (footballer) =

English footballer

Personal information
- Full name: Paul Christopher Sturgess
- Date of birth: 4 August 1975 (age 51)
- Place of birth: Dartford, England
- Position: Left back

Youth career
- Charlton Athletic

Senior career*
Years	Team	Apps	(Gls)
1993–1997	Charlton Athletic	51	(0)
1997–1998	Millwall	14	(0)
1998	→ Brighton & Hove Albion (loan)	8	(0)
1998–1999	Brighton & Hove Albion	22	(0)
1999–2001	Hereford United	56	(0)
2001–2002	Stevenage Borough	25	(0)
2002	→ Gravesend & Northfleet (loan)	8	(0)
2002–2003	Gravesend & Northfleet	0	(0)
- * Club domestic league appearances and goals

Paul Christopher Sturgess (born 4 August 1975 in Dartford) is an English former footballer who played as a left back in the Football League for Charlton Athletic, Millwall and Brighton & Hove Albion, and in the Conference for Hereford United, Stevenage Borough and Gravesend & Northfleet.
