= Paul Bacon (footballer) =

English footballer (born 1970)

Personal information
- Full name: Paul Darren Bacon
- Date of birth: 20 December 1970 (age 55)
- Place of birth: Forest Gate, England
- Position: Midfielder

Youth career
- ?–1989: Charlton Athletic

Senior career*
| Years | Team | Apps | (Gls) |
| 1989–1993 | Charlton Athletic | 33 | (0) |
| 1993–1994 | Dagenham & Redbridge | 3 | (0) |
| Total | | 36 | (0) |
- * Club domestic league appearances and goals

Paul Darren Bacon (born 20 December 1970) is an English former professional footballer who played as a midfielder for Charlton Athletic, making 33 appearances in the Football League. He later played non-league football with Dagenham & Redbridge.
