= Peter Garland (footballer) =

English footballer

Personal information
- Full name: Peter John Garland
- Date of birth: 20 January 1971 (age 55)
- Place of birth: Croydon, England
- Height: 5 ft 9 in (1.75 m)
- Position: Midfielder

Senior career*
Years	Team	Apps	(Gls)
1989–1992	Tottenham Hotspur	1	(0)
1992	Newcastle United	2	(0)
1992–1996	Charlton Athletic	53	(2)
1995–1996	→Wycombe Wanderers (loan)	5	(0)
1996	Leyton Orient	21	(0)
- Crawley Town
- Whyteleafe
- Dulwich Hamlet
2004–2006	Greenwich Borough		
- Erith Town

Managerial career
- 2006: Greenwich Borough
- * Club domestic league appearances and goals

Peter John Garland (born 20 January 1971) is an English former professional footballer who played for Tottenham Hotspur, Newcastle United, Charlton Athletic, Wycombe Wanderers, Leyton Orient and represented England at youth level.

== Career ==
Garland began his career at Tottenham Hotspur as a youth trainee in July 1989. The midfielder made one substitute appearance for Spurs in April 1991 against Norwich City. Newcastle United manager Kevin Keegan paid £35,000 for Garland in March 1992. He went on to feature in two matches. He transferred to Charlton Athletic and notched up a further 53 appearances and netting twice between 1992–95. Garland joined Wycombe Wanderers on loan before joining Leyton Orient in July 1996. After leaving Brisbane Road he played for several non-league clubs including Crawley Town, Whyteleafe, Dulwich Hamlet, Greenwich Borough and Erith Town. He was appointed caretaker player manager of Greenwich in 2006, but was sacked later in the year.
