= Steve Gatting =

English footballer (born 1959)

Personal information
- Full name: Stephen Paul Gatting
- Date of birth: 29 May 1959 (age 67)
- Place of birth: Willesden, London, England
- Positions: Centre half; central midfielder

Youth career
- 1975–1977: Arsenal

Senior career*
Years	Team	Apps	(Gls)
1977–1981	Arsenal	58	(5)
1981–1991	Brighton & Hove Albion	316	(19)
1991–1993	Charlton Athletic	64	(3)
Total		438	(27)

Managerial career
- 2007–2018: Arsenal (U21 and U23 manager)
- * Club domestic league appearances and goals

Stephen Paul Gatting (born 29 May 1959) is an English former professional footballer who played as a centre half or central midfielder. He notably played for Brighton & Hove Albion in the 1983 FA Cup Final. He was most recently a youth team coach at Arsenal.

== Career ==
Gatting started his career at Arsenal, joining as an apprentice in July 1975. He turned professional in 1977, and quickly rose up the ranks, making his first-team debut as a substitute against Lokomotiv Leipzig in a UEFA Cup match on 13 September 1978; Arsenal won 3–0. He immediately held down a first-team place, making 30 appearances in the 1978-79 season. He was not part of the squad that won the 1979 FA Cup Final, where they beat Manchester United 3–2 with a late Alan Sunderland goal. However he did contribute six appearances en route to the final; five of which came in the third round against Sheffield Wednesday (it took four replays to decide the tie, Gatting scoring one of the goals in the decisive replay) and the sixth was the semi-final against Wolverhampton Wanderers.

After his playing career, he coached for seven years at Christ's Hospital school and from 2007 was coach of the under-23s at Arsenal, but he was suspended in May 2018, alongside assistant Carl Laraman, in relation to accusations of bullying, and later released.

Gatting was also a competent cricketer, who made several appearances for Middlesex's second eleven

== Personal life ==
Gatting's brother is the former England cricketer Mike Gatting, and his son Joe Gatting followed both his father and uncle, first making 44 appearances as a footballer for Brighton and Hove Albion, before later transitioning to become a cricketer for Sussex and then Hampshire.

== Honours ==
Brighton & Hove Albion

- FA Cup runner-up: 1982–83
