= John Bumstead =

English footballer (born 1958)

Personal information
- Full name: John Bumstead
- Date of birth: 27 November 1958 (age 67)
- Place of birth: Rotherhithe, London, England
- Height: 5 ft 7 in (1.70 m)
- Position: Midfielder

Youth career
- Chelsea

Senior career*
Years	Team	Apps	(Gls)
1978–1991	Chelsea	339	(38)
1991–1993	Charlton Athletic	56	(3)
- Bromley
Total		395	(41)
- * Club domestic league appearances and goals

John Bumstead (born 27 November 1958) is an English former footballer who played as a midfielder in the Football League for Chelsea, where he spent most of his career, and Charlton Athletic.

== Club career ==
Bumstead started his career in the Chelsea youth set-up, and was well established in the first team by the time they won the Second Division in 1983–84, and with it promotion to the First Division. He helped them win the Full Members Cup in 1985–86, when they also finished sixth in the league. He remained with the club after their relegation in 1987–88 and collected a Second Division medal the following season as they regained their First Division status at the first attempt.

He remained with Chelsea for another two seasons, making a total of 409 appearances and scoring 44 goals, before being transferred to Charlton Athletic, where he spent two seasons before retiring from professional football in his 35th year.

== Career statistics ==
Appearances and goals by club, season and competition
Club	Season	League			FA Cup		League Cup		Members Cup		Total	
Club	Season	Division	Apps	Goals	Apps	Goals	Apps	Goals	Apps	Goals	Apps	Goals
Chelsea	1978–79	First Division	8	1	0	0	0	0	0	0	8	1
Chelsea	1979–80	Second Division	28	3	0	0	2	0	0	0	30	3
Chelsea	1980–81	Second Division	41	1	1	0	2	0	0	0	44	1
Chelsea	1981–82	Second Division	21	4	6	1	2	1	0	0	29	6
Chelsea	1982–83	Second Division	36	4	3	1	3	0	0	0	42	5
Chelsea	1983–84	Second Division	31	7	0	0	4	0	0	0	35	7
Chelsea	1984–85	First Division	25	3	1	0	6	1	0	0	32	4
Chelsea	1985–86	First Division	32	1	1	0	5	0	4	1	42	2
Chelsea	1986–87	First Division	29	8	3	1	3	0	1	0	36	9
Chelsea	1987–88	First Division	17	1	2	0	0	0	5	0	24	1
Chelsea	1988–89	Second Division	29	2	0	0	2	0	0	0	31	2
Chelsea	1989–90	First Division	28	2	3	0	1	0	6	1	38	3
Chelsea	1990–91	First Division	13	1	1	0	4	0	0	0	18	1
Chelsea total			338	38	21	3	34	1	16	2	409	44

== Honours ==
Chelsea

- Football League Second Division: 1988–89
- Full Members' Cup: 1985–86, 1989–90
