= Paul Gorman (footballer, born 1968) =

English footballer

Personal information
- Full name: Paul Michael Gorman
- Date of birth: 18 September 1968 (age 58)
- Place of birth: Macclesfield, England
- Height: 5 ft 9 in (1.75 m)
- Position: Forward

Senior career*
Years	Team	Apps	(Gls)
1987–1989	Doncaster Rovers	16	(9)
1989–1991	Fisher Athletic	82	(82)
1991–1994	Charlton Athletic	56	(26)
1994–1995	Welling United	24	(18)
1995–1996	Fisher Athletic	?	(46)
2017–2020	South East Athletic	?	(40)
- * Club domestic league appearances and goals

Paul Michael Gorman (born 18 September 1968) is an English former professional footballer who played in the Football League, as a forward.
