= Simon Webster (footballer) =

English footballer

Personal information
- Full name: Simon Paul Webster
- Date of birth: 20 January 1964 (age 62)
- Place of birth: Hinckley, England
- Height: 6 ft 0 in (1.83 m)
- Position: Defender

Youth career
- Tottenham Hotspur

Senior career*
Years	Team	Apps	(Gls)
1981–1985	Tottenham Hotspur	3	(0)
1983–1984	→ Exeter City (loan)	26	(0)
1985	→ Norwich City (loan)	0	(0)
1985	→ Huddersfield Town (loan)	9	(0)
1985–1988	Huddersfield Town	115	(4)
1988–1990	Sheffield United	37	(3)
1990	→ Charlton Athletic (loan)	3	(0)
1990–1993	Charlton Athletic	124	(7)
1993–1995	West Ham United	5	(0)
1995	→ Oldham Athletic (loan)	7	(0)
1995	→ Derby County (loan)	3	(0)
1995-96	St Albans City	30	(0)
Total		328	(14)
- * Club domestic league appearances and goals

Simon Paul Webster (born 20 January 1964) is an English former professional footballer who played as a defender in the Football League for Tottenham Hotspur, Exeter City, Huddersfield Town, Sheffield United, Charlton Athletic, West Ham United, Oldham Athletic and Derby County. He also spent time on loan to Norwich City without appearing for the first team, and played non-league football for St Albans City.

Webster broke his leg in two places, an injury re-inflicted by a training-ground tackle by Julian Dicks within weeks of joining West Ham United. Although Webster was able to play again, he chose to retire from the professional game in November 1995 to study physiotherapy. Once qualified, he worked for West Ham United and Gillingham.
