= Darren Pitcher =

English footballer (1969–2018)

Personal information
- Full name: Darren Edward James Pitcher
- Date of birth: 12 October 1969
- Place of birth: Stepney, London, England
- Date of death: 25 November 2018 (aged 49)
- Place of death: Essex, England
- Positions: Defender; midfielder

Senior career*
Years	Team	Apps	(Gls)
1988–1994	Charlton Athletic	173	(8)
1989	→ Galway United (loan)	4	(1)
1994–1999	Crystal Palace	64	(0)
1998	→ Leyton Orient (loan)	1	(0)
1999–2000	Romford	15	(2)
- Purfleet
- Carshalton Athletic
- Chelmsford City
- Ilford

International career
1985	England U16	8	(2)
- * Club domestic league appearances and goals

Darren Edward James Pitcher (12 October 1969 – 25 November 2018) was an English professional footballer who played as a defender and a midfielder.

He notably played in the Premier League for Crystal Palace during the 1994–95 and 1997–98 seasons, he also played in the Football League for both Charlton Athletic and Leyton Orient as well as a brief loan spell in Ireland with Galway United. He retired from professional football due to injury but later spent time in Non-League football and turned out for Romford, Purfleet, Carshalton Athletic, Chelmsford City and Ilford.

== Career ==
Pitcher played for Charlton Athletic, Crystal Palace and Leyton Orient. Pitcher started his career as a right full back at Charlton, but then converted to an effective defensive midfielder.

He signed on loan for Seamus McDonagh at Galway United in January 1989 and made his League of Ireland debut at Athlone on the 16th. When Frank Worthington made his debut on 12 February Pitcher scored the equaliser at St Patrick's Athletic.

Pitcher joined Crystal Palace in 1994. In his first season at the club he helped Palace to the semi-finals of both domestic cups. It was in these cup runs that he scored his only two goals for Palace. In the League Cup quarter final against Manchester City he scored his first goal, and his second came in an FA Cup quarter final replay against Wolverhampton Wanderers. However Palace's runs were ended by Liverpool in the League Cup semi final and Manchester United in the FA Cup semi final. His career ended at Crystal Palace in a match against Huddersfield Town in August 1996, after a challenge by Paul Reid. He attempted to bring a case of negligence against Huddersfield Town, which he lost. He never played for Palace again, and never played professional football again except for a brief loan spell at Leyton Orient in January 1998. Pitcher later played in Non-League football, for Romford, Purfleet, Carshalton Athletic, Chelmsford City and Ilford.

== Personal life and death ==
After retiring from football, Pitcher worked in the building trade.

On 26 November 2018, it was announced that Pitcher had died.
