= Garry Nelson =

English footballer (born 1961)

Personal information
- Full name: Garry Paul Nelson
- Date of birth: 16 January 1961 (age 65)
- Place of birth: Braintree, England
- Height: 5 ft 10 in (1.78 m)
- Positions: Striker; left winger

Senior career*
Years	Team	Apps	(Gls)
1979–1983	Southend United	129	(17)
1983–1985	Swindon Town	79	(7)
1985–1987	Plymouth Argyle	74	(20)
1987–1991	Brighton & Hove Albion	144	(47)
1990	→ Notts County (loan)	2	(0)
1991–1996	Charlton Athletic	185	(37)
1996–1997	Torquay United	34	(8)
Total		647	(136)
- * Club domestic league appearances and goals

Garry Paul Nelson (born 16 January 1961) is an English former professional footballer who played as a striker or left winger in the Football League for Southend United, Swindon Town, Plymouth Argyle, Brighton & Hove Albion, Charlton Athletic and Torquay United (as player/assistant manager) between 1979 and 1997. He was voted into Plymouth Argyle's Team of the Century.

== Background and writing ==
Nelson passed eight 'O' Levels and 3 'A' Levels (French, Geography and Geology) and had the chance to attend Loughborough University but accepted the offer of a professional contract at Southend instead. Nelson also wrote two memoirs about his professional career, Left Foot Forward and Left Foot in the Grave. The books are written in diary form, chronicling a season with Charlton (1994–95) and Torquay (1996–97) respectively. The books have been generally well received, and noted as showing the real life of "ordinary" professional footballers, became best-sellers, and each was shortlisted for the William Hill Sports Book of the Year award.

== Career after retirement ==
After retiring from the game in 1997, Nelson became commercial executive of the Professional Footballers' Association. In 2018, he was still playing football, regularly turning out for Chapel United in the Southend Borough Combination Veterans League and Charlton Athletic veterans.

== Honours ==
Southend United

- Football League Fourth Division: 1980–81

Individual

- PFA Team of the Year: 1987–88 Third Division
