= Steve Gritt =

English footballer and manager

Personal information
- Full name: Stephen John Gritt
- Date of birth: 31 October 1957 (age 69)
- Place of birth: Bournemouth, England
- Height: 5 ft 9 in (1.75 m)
- Position: Midfielder

Senior career*
Years	Team	Apps	(Gls)
1975–1977	AFC Bournemouth	6	(3)
1977–1989	Charlton Athletic	347	(24)
1989	Walsall	20	(1)
1989–1993	Charlton Athletic	33	(1)
Total		406	(29)

Managerial career
- 1991–1995: Charlton Athletic
- 1996–1998: Brighton & Hove Albion
- 2000: Millwall (caretaker)
- 2004–2010: Charlton Athletic Academy
- 2023: Dagenham & Redbridge (caretaker)
- * Club domestic league appearances and goals

Stephen John Gritt (born 31 October 1957) is an English former football player, manager and scout.

His playing career included spells at Charlton Athletic, AFC Bournemouth and Walsall. He was joint manager of Charlton for four years and, from 1996, manager of Brighton & Hove Albion. During a spell at Millwall, Gritt was briefly caretaker manager. After back office roles at Charlton and Bournemouth, he was assistant manager at Ebbsfleet United (2013–2018) and at Macclesfield Town, before joining Dagenham & Redbridge as assistant to Daryl McMahon in January 2020.

== Playing career ==
Gritt spent most of his playing career with Charlton Athletic, after joining from home town club AFC Bournemouth in 1977. In his first spell with Charlton, he experienced one relegation to the Third Division (1980), one promotion to the Second Division (1981), one promotion to the First Division (1986), and was a runner-up in the Full Members Cup final of 1987. In 1989, he moved to Walsall for a brief spell but soon returned to Charlton. In his second spell, he experienced another relegation in 1990.

In all, Gritt made 435 appearances for Charlton, with 26 goals, placing him fifth on Charlton's all-time appearance list. He played a further two seasons after being appointed manager, retiring in 1993. He later had brief spells with non-league teams Welling United and Tooting & Mitcham after leaving Charlton in 1995.

== Managerial career ==
Gritt was named as joint player-manager of Charlton in 1991, alongside Alan Curbishley. In his four-year tenure, Gritt helped to lay the foundations for future successes under Curbishley, who succeeded him as sole manager in 1995. Several key players were debuted under the joint managers, including Lee Bowyer, John Robinson, Richard Rufus and Shaun Newton, and went on to be important components of Charlton's successful team of the late 1990s and early 2000s.

Gritt was made manager of Brighton & Hove Albion in 1996, who were at the time eleven points adrift at the bottom of the Football League. He was able to turn Brighton's form around, and they successfully avoided relegation to the Conference on the final day of the 1996–97 season. Brighton were never in danger of relegation the following season, but the club's board had higher expectations and Gritt was fired in 1998. Nevertheless, Gritt is still fondly remembered by the Seagulls' supporters.

Gritt later moved to Millwall and became reserve-team manager. In 2000, he had a short spell as caretaker manager of the Lions and was then assistant manager to Mark McGhee until 2003. In June 2004, Gritt returned to Charlton in the role of academy manager, a role he retained until 2010.

From July 2011 to September 2012, Gritt was chief scout at Bournemouth. From June 2013 to October 2018, he was assistant manager at Ebbsfleet United, working with former Charlton team-mate Steve Brown and then, after a spell as chief scout, serving as assistant to Daryl McMahon. In August 2019, Gritt was again appointed assistant manager to McMahon, this time at Macclesfield Town. Both resigned on 2 January 2020, citing the club's crippling financial situation, with both subsequently joining Dagenham & Redbridge. Following McMahon's departure in February 2023, Gritt was appointed caretaker manager before departing the club on 17 March 2023 a week after the appointment of Ben Strevens as manager.

== Managerial statistics ==
As of 7 March 2023

Team	Nat	From	To	Record				
Team	Nat	From	To	G	W	D	L	Win %
Charlton Athletic	(England)	24 July 1991	15 June 1995	206	76	50	80	36.89
Brighton & Hove Albion	(England)	11 December 1996	25 February 1998	62	14	18	30	22.58
Millwall (caretaker)	(England)	17 September 2000	25 September 2000	2	2	0	0	100.00
Dagenham & Redbridge (caretaker)	(England)	24 February 2023	10 March 2023	4	2	0	2	50.00
Total				274	94	68	112	34.31

== Personal life ==
Gritt suffered a tragedy on 7 December 2002 when his 18-year-old daughter Hayley died as a result of cancer. Hayley, who had battled a brain tumour for 10 years, was a lifelong Charlton supporter and a season ticket holder at The Valley, even after her father's departure from the club in 1995. Gritt has been involved in numerous fundraising activities for cancer charities ever since.
