= Carl Leaburn =

English footballer

Personal information
- Full name: Carl Winston Leaburn
- Date of birth: 30 March 1969 (age 57)
- Place of birth: Lewisham, England
- Height: 6 ft 3 in (1.91 m)
- Position: Striker

Youth career
- Charlton Athletic

Senior career*
Years	Team	Apps	(Gls)
1987–1998	Charlton Athletic	322	(53)
1990	→ Northampton Town (loan)	9	(0)
1998–2001	Wimbledon	58	(4)
2001–2002	Queens Park Rangers	1	(0)
2002–2005	Grays Athletic	62	(9)
Total		452	(66)

International career
- England U20
- * Club domestic league appearances and goals

Carl Winston Leaburn (born 30 March 1969) is an English former footballer and co-commentator for BBC London.

As a player he was a striker who played for Charlton Athletic over eleven years where he scored 53 league goals in 322 games. Following promotion to the Premier League in 1998 he joined fellow top tier side Wimbledon where he remained for two seasons until the Dons were relegated. He had a brief spell with Northampton Town and later with Queens Park Rangers during the 2001–02 season before retiring in 2005 with non-league Grays Athletic. He is a former England U20 international.

== Career ==
=== Charlton Athletic ===
Born in nearby Lewisham, Leaburn progressed through the youth set-up at Charlton Athletic and made his debut in the late 1980s. He also played in the England Under-20s team under Graham Taylor. A regular in Charlton's team for over a decade, he developed the reputation of a centre forward who was a target man. One highlight was scoring a goal against Manchester United at Old Trafford in the FA Cup in 1994. Leaburn became a cult figure with many fans with one popular chant being the repetition of his surname. However, he did manage double figures in seasons 1991–92 and 1993–94, during which Charlton were contenders for a place in the play-offs. Clive Mendonca has claimed that Leaburn was the best strike partner he played with whilst at the club.

=== Wimbledon ===
In January 1998, Leaburn moved to Premier League side Wimbledon for a £300,000 fee. He made his debut as a substitute against Liverpool at Anfield on 10 January 1998. His first goals for his new club came when he scored twice away to Crystal Palace in a 3–0 win on 9 February 1998. This was perhaps the finest moment of his Wimbledon career as he had helped defeat rivals Crystal Palace in the "Landlords vs. Tenants" derby game at Selhurst Park. He went on to score twice more for Wimbledon in the 1997–98 season with strikes against Aston Villa and Southampton. However the four goals he scored for Wimbledon that season would be the only goals he would score in the league for the South London club. Leaburn's only other goal for the club came in a League Cup tie with Portsmouth in September 1998. His major contribution to Wimbledon was more in working hard to create goals for teammates, rather than scoring himself. His record of four goals in 58 league games does not do justice to either his work-rate or his popularity with fans, who greatly valued his enthusiasm and indefatigability. Leaburn stayed on at the Dons following their relegation from the Premier League in 2000.

=== Later career ===
He was eventually sold to Queens Park Rangers on 31 December 2001 where he played only one game against Reading before being released. He then dropped into non-League football with Grays Athletic where he scored nine times between December 2002 and May 2005 when he ended his football career.

== Media career ==
After retiring, Leaburn completed a study for a BTEC Radio Broadcasting course. He worked for BBC London as a match summariser and interviewer. He now works for Premier League productions as a match analyst and occasionally as a security guard for the Canary Wharf estate. Leaburn also worked with Redstone.fm, a community radio station for Redhill, Reigate and Banstead.

== Personal life ==
Leaburn's son is current Charlton Athletic forward Miles Leaburn.
