= Colin Walsh (footballer) =

Scottish footballer (born 1962)

Personal information
- Full name: Colin David Walsh
- Date of birth: 22 July 1962 (age 64)
- Place of birth: Hamilton, South Lanarkshire, Scotland
- Height: 5 ft 9 in (1.75 m)
- Position: Midfielder

Senior career*
Years	Team	Apps	(Gls)
1979–1986	Nottingham Forest	139	(32)
1986–1996	Charlton Athletic	242	(21)
1989	→ Peterborough United (loan)	5	(1)
1991	→ Middlesbrough (loan)	13	(1)
Total		399	(55)

International career
1982–1983	Scotland U21	5	(1)
- * Club domestic league appearances and goals

Colin David Walsh (born 22 July 1962) is a Scottish former footballer.

Born in Hamilton, South Lanarkshire, Walsh started his career under manager Brian Clough at Nottingham Forest. He made his league debut for Forest on 29 November 1980 as a substitute in a 1–1 draw at Coventry City aged 18. Walsh was picked for the Scotland national team but never played for the full side. Six years after making his debut Walsh moved to Charlton Athletic. Despite playing in the First Division, the club was forced to play home games at Selhurst Park as The Valley had been closed.

He helped Charlton stay in the First Division until 1990 when they were relegated. Nevertheless, he remained with the club and etched his name into Addicks history in 1992. Charlton were playing their first game back at The Valley against Portsmouth on 5 December 1992 and Walsh scored the only goal to give Charlton a 1–0 win. This historical goal is memorized in a banner in The Valley's north stand carrying Walsh's name and the time of the goal. A popular player with supporters, Walsh remained with the club until 1996 to complete a decade of service to Charlton before retiring.

His brother Derek played for Hamilton Academical and Sligo Rovers.

== Honours ==
Charlton Athletic

- Full Members' Cup runner-up: 1986–87
