= List of Charlton Athletic F.C. managers =

Charlton Athletic F.C. is an English association football club based in Charlton in the Royal Borough of Greenwich, London. Since the club's foundation in 1905, they have been managed by 30 different permanent managers. Their longest-serving manager was Jimmy Seed, who held the role for 23 years from 1933 to 1956.

== Statistics ==
Name	Nationality	Years
Walter Rayner	England	1920–1925
Sandy MacFarlane	Scotland	1925–1928
Albert Lindon	England	1928
Sandy MacFarlane	Scotland	1928–1932
Albert Lindon	England	1932–1933
Jimmy Seed	England	1933–1956
David Clark (caretaker)	England	1956
Jimmy Trotter	England	1956–1961
David Clark (caretaker)	England	1961
Frank Hill	Scotland	1961–1965
Bob Stokoe	England	1965–1967
Eddie Firmani	Italy	1967–1970
Theo Foley	Republic of Ireland	1970–1974
Les Gore (caretaker)	England	1974
Andy Nelson	England	1974–1980
Mike Bailey	England	1980–1981
Alan Mullery	England	1981–1982
Ken Craggs	England	1982
Lennie Lawrence	England	1982–1991
Alan Curbishley & Steve Gritt	England	1991–1995
Alan Curbishley	England	1995–2006
Iain Dowie	Northern Ireland	2006
Les Reed	England	2006
Alan Pardew	England	2006–2008
Phil Parkinson	England	2008–2011
Keith Peacock (caretaker)	England	2011
Chris Powell	England	2011–2014
José Riga	Belgium	2014
Bob Peeters	Belgium	2014–2015
Damian Matthew & Ben Roberts (caretakers)	England	2015
Guy Luzon	Israel	2015
Karel Fraeye	Belgium	2015–2016
José Riga	Belgium	2016
Russell Slade	England	2016
Kevin Nugent (caretaker)	England	2016
Karl Robinson	England	2016–2018
Lee Bowyer (caretaker)	England	2018
Lee Bowyer	England	2018–2021
Johnnie Jackson (caretaker)	England	2021
Nigel Adkins	England	2021
Johnnie Jackson (caretaker)	England	2021
Johnnie Jackson	England	2021-2022
Ben Garner	England	2022
Anthony Hayes (caretaker)	England	2022
Dean Holden	England	2022-2023
Jason Pearce (caretaker)	England	2023
Michael Appleton	England	2023-2024
Curtis Fleming (caretaker)	(Republic of Ireland) Ireland	2024
Nathan Jones	Wales	2024-present
