= 1987 Football League Second Division play-off final =

Association football match in England

Charlton Athletic	Leeds United
1	1
- on aggregate Charlton Athletic won after a replay

First leg
Charlton Athletic	Leeds United
1	0
- Date: 23 May 1987
- Venue: Selhurst Park, London
- Referee: Roger Milford
- Attendance: 16,680

Second leg
Leeds United	Charlton Athletic
1	0
- Date: 25 May 1987
- Venue: Elland Road, Leeds
- Referee: Brian Hill
- Attendance: 31,395

Replay
Leeds United	Charlton Athletic
1	2
- After extra time
- Date: 29 May 1987
- Venue: St Andrew's, Birmingham
- Referee: Allan Gunn
- Attendance: 15,841

The 1987 Football League Second Division play-off final was an association football match contested between Leeds United and Charlton Athletic over two legs on 23 May 1987 and 25 May 1987 to determine which club would play the next season in the First Division. Charlton Athletic had finished fourth from the bottom in the First Division, while Leeds United finished fourth in the Second Division. They were joined in the play-offs by the teams that had finished third and fifth in the Second Division: Charlton Athletic defeated Ipswich in their play-off semi-final, while Leeds United defeated Oldham Athletic in the other semi-final.

The first leg of the final was played at Selhurst Park in London, in front of a crowd of 16,680. Jim Melrose scored the game's only goal to give Charlton Athletic a 1–0 win. Two days later, at Elland Road in Leeds, 31,395 fans saw Brendon Ormsby score the game's only goal as Leeds United won the match 1–0. This meant arranging a replay held at St Andrew's in Birmingham, which was played on 29 May 1987. After full-time, the score remained 0–0. Extra-time was played with John Sheridan scoring first for Leeds in the 99th minute. Peter Shirtliff then scored twice in the 113th and 117th minutes to give Charlton Athletic a 2–1 victory and to preserve their place in the top tier of English football.

The following season, Charlton Athletic finished one spot above the relegation zone in the First Division ahead of Chelsea by goal-difference. Leeds United ended their next Second Division campaign in seventh position, eight points below the play-offs.

== Route to the final ==
Football League First Division final table, relegation positions
Pos	Team	Pld	W	D	L	GF	GA	GD	Pts
19	Charlton Athletic	42	11	11	20	45	55	−10	44
20	Leicester City	42	11	9	22	54	76	−22	42
21	Manchester City	42	8	15	19	28	57	−29	39
22	Aston Villa	42	8	12	22	45	79	−34	36

Football League Second Division final table, leading positions
Pos	Team	Pld	W	D	L	GF	GA	GD	Pts
1	Derby County	42	25	9	8	64	38	+26	84
2	Portsmouth	42	23	9	10	53	28	+25	78
3	Oldham Athletic	42	22	9	11	65	44	+21	75
4	Leeds United	42	19	11	12	58	44	+14	68
5	Ipswich Town	42	17	13	12	59	43	+16	64

Charlton Athletic finished the 1986–87 season in 19th place in the First Division. They avoided automatic relegation by defeating Queens Park Rangers on the final day of the season and finished two points ahead of relegated team Leicester City. Leeds United finished the season in fourth place in the Second Division, ten points behind Portsmouth who were automatically promoted to the First Division along with Derby Country. Both Charlton Athletic and Leeds United, along with Oldham Athletic and Ipswich Town, entered the play-offs to determine who would play in the First Division in the 1987–88 season.

Leeds United hosted the first leg of the semi-final at Elland Road in Leeds on 14 May 1987 as they faced Oldham Athletic, who were attempting to gain promotion to the top flight where they had last played in 1923. Kick off was delayed by 15 minutes as a result of the large crowd of 29,742. Leeds' Mark Aizlewood received a booking in the 13th minute for a late tackle while Oldham's Mike Milligan was booked a minute later. The best chance of the first half fell to Sheridan whose curling free kick was caught by Andy Goram in the Oldham goal. The only goal of the game came in the 89th minute when Keith Edwards, who had come on as a substitute 17 minutes earlier, scored a header at the near post to give Leeds a one-goal advantage. The second leg of the semi-final was played three days later at Boundary Park. Oldham opened the scoring in the 18th minute when Gary Williams headed in a cross from Denis Irwin. It would take until the 89th minute before Oldham's substitute Mike Cecere headed in from another Irwin cross to put his team ahead 2–0. A minute later, Baird knocked down a cross from Sheridan for Edwards to score through a group of players, making the aggregate score 2–2, and sending the game into extra time. No further goals were scored, and Leeds progressed to the final on the away goals rule.

In the second play-off semi-final, Charlton Athletic's opponents were Ipswich Town with the first leg being held at Portman Road in Ipswich on 14 May 1987. It was the clubs' first league meeting in nearly twenty years. In the tenth minute, Ipswich's goalkeeper Paul Cooper made his fifth penalty save of the season after denying Colin Walsh's spot kick. The Charlton goalkeeper Bob Bolder made a save from Kevin Wilson before Jim Melrose hit the Ipswich crossbar. Bolder then made a double save, first from Jason Dozzell and then denying the headed rebound from Tony Humes, and the match ended 0–0. The second leg took place at Selhurst Park three days later. Melrose scored the opening goal of the game with a 15-yard (14 m) header from a John Humphrey cross. Two minutes later Melrose doubled the lead with another header, this time from a Paul Miller pass. In the 85th minute, Ipswich midfielder Steve McCall scored after a shot from Mich d'Avray rebounded from the post, but Charlton Athletic qualified for the play-off final 2–1 on aggregate.

== Match ==
=== Background ===
This was the inaugural season of the English Football League play-offs which was introduced as part of the "Heathrow Agreement", a ten-point proposal to restructure the Football League, which included this mechanism by which the number of clubs in the First Division could be reduced from 22 to 20. For the first two years of the play-offs, one relegation place was decided upon using a single-elimination tournament where each round was played as a two-legged tie: one club from the First Division competed with three clubs from the Second Division for a place in the top tier of English football. The play-offs were not universally lauded: Oldham Athletic manager Joe Royle was scathing of them after losing to Leeds in the semi-final, saying "We finished seven points clear of Leeds. So to go out on away goals to them means there is something unjust. I welcomed the play-offs but possibly hadn't considered the long-term ramifications."

Leeds United had played in the second tier of English football since they were relegated in the 1981–82 season. Billy Bremner had been appointed as their manager in October 1985, replacing Eddie Gray. After leading the club to 14th position in the league that season, Bremner made a number of changes to playing staff, including bringing in at least ten players. Along with the fourth-place finish in the league, Bremner oversaw Leeds' run to the semi-final of the 1986–87 FA Cup where they lost to Coventry City. Charlton Athletic had been promoted to the First Division the previous season, having spent five seasons in the Second Division. Their manager Lennie Lawrence had been moved into the caretaker role at the club in November 1982 after Ken Craggs was sacked with them fifth-from-bottom in the Second Division. Despite finishing in 18th place in the First Division, Lawrence's team had made it to the 1987 Full Members' Cup Final where they were defeated by Second Division Blackburn Rovers 1–0 at Wembley Stadium.

=== First leg ===
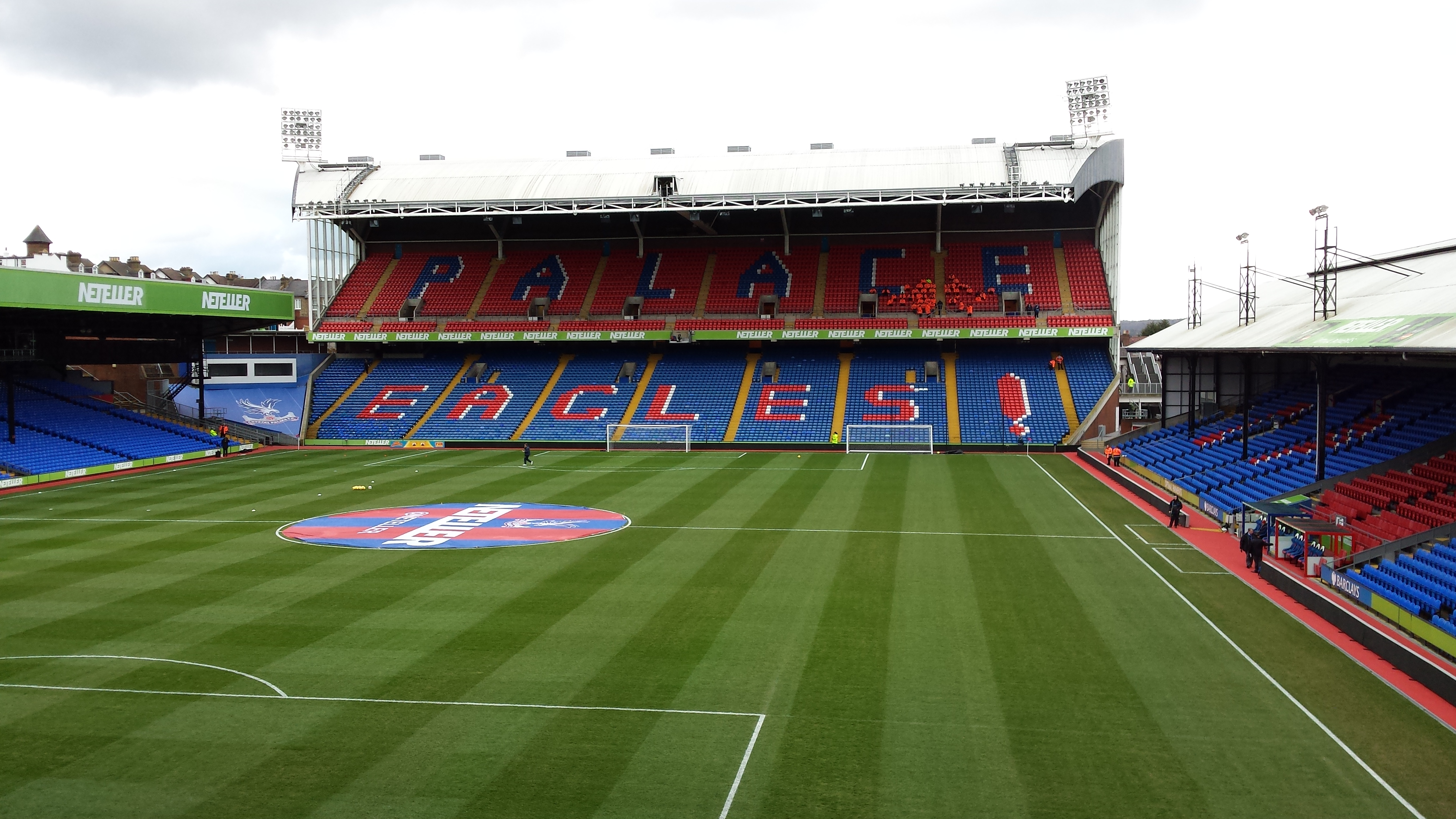
The first leg was played at Charlton's Selhurst Park (pictured in 2015).

==== Summary ====
The first leg of the play-off final was delayed from a scheduled Friday evening kick-off to a Saturday afternoon game to avoid traffic congestion at a supermarket local to Selhurst Park. The match was played in front of a crowd of 16,680 in damp conditions and was refereed by Roger Milford. Andy Peake's strike from outside the penalty area just flew over the Leeds crossbar before Melrose headed a cross from Walsh goalbound which was saved by Mervyn Day in the Leeds goal. The game was described in The Guardian by Michael Ralph as "an unending series of squabbles" in which both Charlton's Miller and Leeds' Aizlewood were booked.

Charlton dominated the match but it took until the 87th minute when Melrose scored the opening goal of the afternoon, and his seventeenth of the season, to give them a 1–0 lead. Charlton manager Lennie Lawrence said after the match, "I can't recall us having less room to play any time this season."

==== Details ====
23 May 1987
15:00 BST

Charlton Athletic	1–0	Leeds United
Melrose 87'	Report

Selhurst Park, London
Attendance: 16,680
Referee: Roger Milford

Charlton Athletic	Leeds United

Charlton Athletic
GK	Bob Bolder
RB	John Humphrey
LB	Mark Reid
CM	Andy Peake
CB	Steve Thompson
CB	Paul Miller
CM	Steve Gritt
FW	Mark Stuart
CF	Jim Melrose
CM	Colin Walsh
LW	Garth Crooks
Manager:
Lennie Lawrence

Leeds United
GK	Mervyn Day
RB	Neil Aspin
LB	Bobby McDonald
RM	Mark Aizlewood
CB	Jack Ashurst
CB	Brendon Ormsby
CF	Keith Edwards
CM	John Sheridan
CF	John Pearson
CF	Ian Baird
LM	Micky Adams
Manager:
Billy Bremner

=== Second leg ===
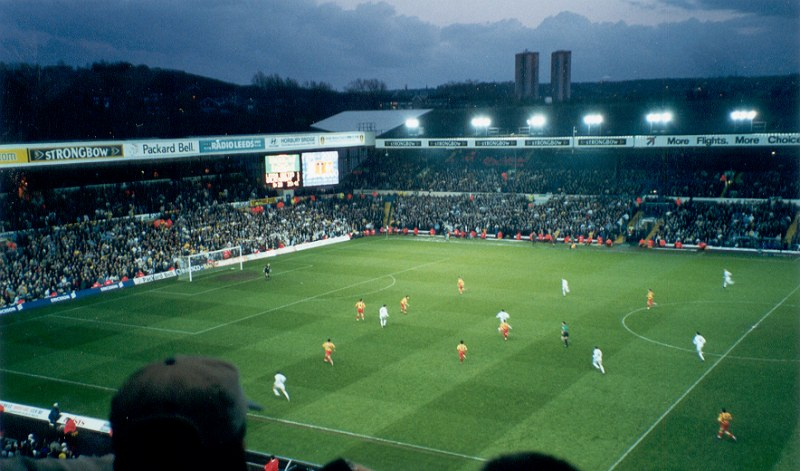
Elland Road (pictured in 2000) was the venue for the second leg of the play-off.

==== Summary ====
The second leg was played on 25 May 1987 Elland Road in front of a crowd of 31,395 and was refereed by Brian Hill. Leeds' John Pearson was ruled out with an injury and was replaced in the starting eleven by Bob Taylor.

The first half saw several robust challenges with former Charlton player Aizlewood receiving a yellow card after he fouled Peake. Leeds held possession for most of the first half, but Taylor missed a rebound that came from a Sheridan challenge with Charlton goalkeeper Bolder. But the ball hit the woodwork and Taylor missed the rebound. In the second half, Leeds United forward Brendon Ormsby scored in the 53rd minute; it was to be the only goal of the game. The aggregate score of 1–1 meant a replay had to be played four days later at St Andrew's in Birmingham, a neutral venue. Lawrence reflected on the nature of the match: "It was fiercely contested but you cannot help that when there's so much at stake. It was a good game and we haven't played better than that and lost all season ... there are worse sides in the First Division."

==== Details ====
25 May 1987
15:00 BST

Leeds United	1–0	Charlton Athletic
Ormsby 52'	Report

Elland Road, Leeds
Attendance: 31,395
Referee: Brian Hill

Leeds United	Charlton Athletic

Leeds United
GK	Mervyn Day
RB	Neil Aspin
LB	Bobby McDonald
RM	Mark Aizlewood
CB	Jack Ashurst
CB	Brendon Ormsby
CF	Keith Edwards
CM	John Sheridan
CF	Bob Taylor
CF	Ian Baird
LM	Micky Adams
Manager:
Billy Bremner

Charlton Athletic
GK	Bob Bolder
RB	John Humphrey
LB	Mark Reid
CM	Andy Peake
CB	Peter Shirtliff
CB	Paul Miller
CM	Steve Gritt
FW	Mark Stuart
CF	Jim Melrose
CM	Colin Walsh
LW	Garth Crooks
Manager:
Lennie Lawrence

=== Replay ===
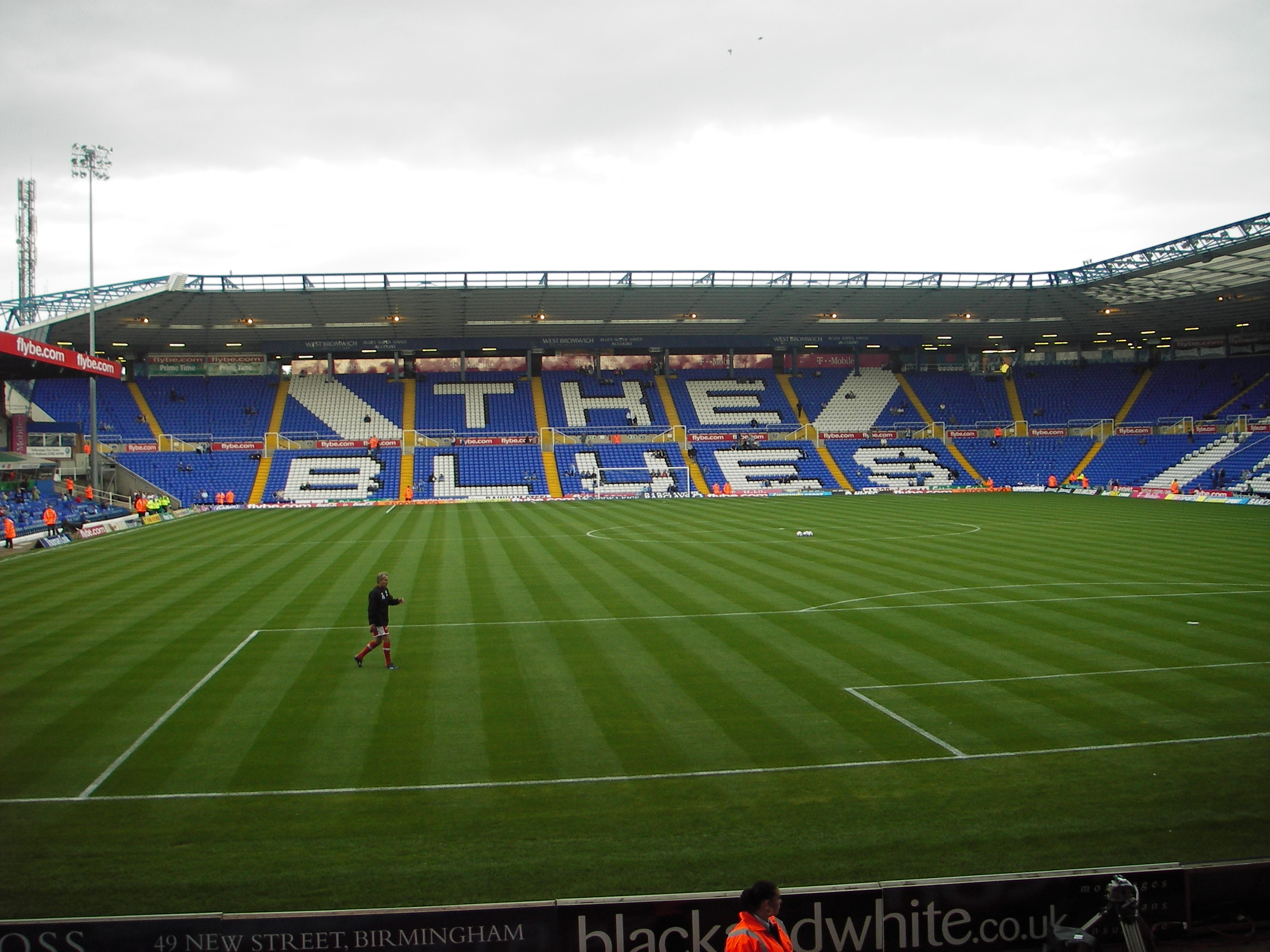
St Andrew's hosted the replay as a neutral venue.

==== Summary ====
The replay was held at St Andrew's, the home of Birmingham City, on 29 May 1987 in front of a crowd of 15,841, and was refereed by Allan Gunn. Lawrence chose a blue kit for Charlton for the replay, as he believed that should any neutral supporters be present at the ground, they would support the team in the same colour as the host club. The West Midlands Police had mobilised at least 300 officers, some mounted and some with dogs, in anticipation of the arrival of at least 13,000 Leeds United supporters. Two years prior, Leeds United fans had rioted at St Andrew's, causing a wall to collapse and resulting in injuries to 96 policemen. Only 2,000 Charlton fans were expected to make the journey to Birmingham. Leeds were hoping that Pearson had recovered from a rib injury while Charlton's only selection dilemma was between Shirtliff and Thompson who was recovering from an Achilles injury.

During normal time Charlton dominated, but after 90 minutes the game remained goalless with Crooks and Melrose having chances to score. Leeds were a defender down after their captain Ormsby left the field before half-time with an injured leg. In the ninth minute of extra time, Sheridan scored from a free kick to give Leeds the lead. But in the second half of extra time, two goals from Shirtliff made it 2–1 to Charlton. First, in the 113th minute, he struck a low shot past Day in the Leeds goal. His second goal came in the 117th minute from a Peake free kick as his header was unchallenged. The match ended 2–1 to Charlton who retained their place in the top tier of English football.

==== Details ====
29 May 1987
19:30 BST

Leeds United	1–2 (a.e.t.)	Charlton Athletic
Sheridan 99'	Report	Shirtliff 113', 117'

St Andrew's, Birmingham
Attendance: 15,841
Referee: Allan Gunn

Leeds United	Charlton Athletic

Leeds United
GK	1	Mervyn Day
RB	2	Neil Aspin
LB	3	Bobby McDonald
CB	5	Jack Ashurst
CB	6	Brendon Ormsby	(substituted off) 44'
RM	4	Mark Aizlewood
CM	7	John Stiles
CM	8	John Sheridan
CF	9	John Pearson
CF	10	Ian Baird
LM	11	Micky Adams
Substitutes:
CF	12	Keith Edwards	(substituted on) 44'
Manager:
Billy Bremner

Charlton Athletic
GK	1	Bob Bolder
RB	2	John Humphrey
CB	5	Peter Shirtliff
CB	6	Paul Miller
LB	3	Mark Reid
CM	7	Steve Gritt
CM	4	Andy Peake
RW	8	Rob Lee
CF	9	Jim Melrose	(substituted off) 96'
LW	10	Garth Crooks
CM	11	Colin Walsh
Substitutes:
FW	12	Mark Stuart	(substituted on) 96'
Manager:
Lennie Lawrence

MATCH RULES

- 90 minutes.
- 30 minutes of extra-time if necessary.

== Post-match ==
After the result, the Charlton manager Lawrence said in an interview, "The play-offs are exciting. I just think the format is wrong." Shirtliff had scored 15 goals in his 17-year career before scoring the two in the play-off final replay. He later said "I had never scored more than one goal in a game before and have never done it since! We were by far the better side so we just carried on playing and showed good patience."

The following season, Charlton Athletic finished in 17th place, one place above the relegation zone after finishing their season with a 1–1 draw to Chelsea with only goal difference separating the two teams. Leeds United finished the following campaign in seventh place, eight points behind the play-off spots and it would not be until 1990 where they were automatically promoted into the top flight.
