= Ian Miller (footballer, born 1955) =

Scottish footballer

Personal information
- Full name: Ian Miller
- Date of birth: 13 May 1955 (age 71)
- Place of birth: Perth, Scotland
- Height: 5 ft 9 in (1.75 m)
- Position: Right winger

Youth career
- Jeanfield Swifts
- Bury

Senior career*
Years	Team	Apps	(Gls)
1973–1975	Bury	15	(0)
1975	Nottingham Forest	0	(0)
1975–1978	Doncaster Rovers	124	(14)
1978–1981	Swindon Town	127	(9)
1981–1989	Blackburn Rovers	268	(16)
1989–1990	Port Vale	21	(1)
1990–1991	Scunthorpe United	12	(0)
1992	Stafford Rangers		
Total		567+	(40+)
- * Club domestic league appearances and goals

Ian Miller (born 13 May 1955) is a Scottish former footballer who played his football in England as a winger. He made 660 league and cup appearances in the English Football League over an 18-year professional career, scoring 48 goals.

He began his career at Bury, helping the club to win promotion out of the Fourth Division in 1973–74. He was then at Nottingham Forest but did not feature for the first team before transferring to Doncaster Rovers in 1975. Voted onto the Fourth Division PFA Team of the Year in 1975–76, 1976–77 and 1977–78, he moved on to Swindon Town in 1978. He switched to Blackburn Rovers in 1981 and spent the next eight years with the club, lifting the Full Members Cup in 1987. He then had brief spells with Port Vale and Scunthorpe United before ending his career with non-League Stafford Rangers. He went into coaching straight after his retirement as a player and worked behind the scenes at a wide variety of clubs in the Football League.

== Playing career ==
=== Bury ===
Miller started his career with the Scottish junior club Jeanfield Swifts before becoming a professional with the English club Bury in 1973. The "Shakers" won promotion out of the Fourth Division in 1973–74, with manager Bobby Smith playing Miller in 15 league games.

=== Nottingham Forest to Doncaster Rovers ===
Miller then moved on to Nottingham Forest of the Second Division, then led by Allan Brown. He failed to play a league game for Forest in 1974–75, and instead moved on to Doncaster Rovers in a player exchange for Micky French in July 1978, who were in the Fourth Division and managed by Stan Anderson. He provided many assists for strike duo Peter Kitchen and Brendan O'Callaghan in the 1975–76, also scoring nine goals himself, including a hat-trick in a 5–1 win over Newport County in November. He played a total of 139 games for "Donny" in league and cup competitions, scoring 15 goals, as the side posted mid-table finishes in 1976–77 and 1977–78. He was voted onto the PFA Team of the Year for the fourth tier in all three of his seasons at Belle Vue as his accurate crosses provided a huge number of goalscoring chances for Kitchen and O'Callaghan.

=== Swindon Town ===
He was transferred to Third Division club Swindon Town in exchange for Mick French, in a move that reunited him with manager Bobby Smith. He was signed to provide crosses for Andy Rowland and Alan Mayes. The "Robins" declined from fifth in 1978–79 to tenth in 1979–80 and then 17th in 1980–81 – just one point above the relegation zone. He played 159 games for Swindon in all competitions, scoring 14 goals.

=== Blackburn Rovers ===
Miller then signed with Second Division Blackburn Rovers, then managed by Bobby Saxton, who authorised a £60,000 fee. He went on to become a popular player with the club's fans. Rovers finished in the top-half of the table in 1981–82, 1982–83 and 1983–84, before missing out on promotion to the First Division by just one point in 1984–85. However, they plummeted in 1985–86, avoiding relegation by just three points. Saxton was replaced by Don Mackay halfway through the 1986–87 campaign. Rovers also won the Full Members Cup in 1987, as they beat Charlton Athletic 1–0 in the Wembley final after Miller set up Colin Hendry for the only goal of the game. He then led them to a play-off finish in 1987–88, though Rovers lost to Chelsea at the semi-final stage. They then reached the play-off final in 1988–89, but lost out to Crystal Palace 4–3 over two legs.

=== Later career ===
Miller departed Ewood Park and joined Second Division Port Vale in June 1989, as manager John Rudge needed cover for an injured Gary Ford. He began the 1989–90 season as a regular but lost his place by December and was released in August 1990, having played 24 games in all competitions, scoring once against Ipswich Town on New Year's Day. He moved on to Mick Buxton's Scunthorpe United and helped them to the Fourth Division play-offs, where they lost to Blackpool at the semi-final stage. Miller then ended his career with Stafford Rangers in the Conference.

== Style of play ==
Miller was a pacey right-winger with good dribbling and erratic crossing abilities, as well as a high defensive work rate.

== Coaching career ==
Miller remained active in the game after retiring as a player. He returned to Port Vale as the Community Programme leader in August 1991 and became the youth development officer in May 1992. In November 1994 he left Vale Park to become the reserve team coach at Wolverhampton Wanderers. He later coached at Blackburn Rovers, Blackpool (assisting Colin Hendry), Bury, Leicester City and Manchester City before joining the staff at Leeds United in 2008. On 1 February 2012, chairman Ken Bates sacked manager Simon Grayson, his assistant Glynn Snodin, and Miller. He followed Grayson on to Huddersfield Town the next month, and later went with him to Preston North End and Sunderland. He also joined Grayson at Blackpool in July 2019, marking a return to Bloomfield Road after 14 years. He left the club, along with Grayson, on 12 February 2020.

== Career statistics ==
Appearances and goals by club, season and competition
Club	Season	League			FA Cup		Other (Note: Includes League Cup, Football League Trophy, Football League play-offs and Full Members Cup.)		Total	
Club	Season	Division	Apps	Goals	Apps	Goals	Apps	Goals	Apps	Goals
Bury	1973–74	Fourth Division	15	0	0	0	1	1	16	1
Nottingham Forest	1974–75	Second Division	0	0	0	0	0	0	0	0
Doncaster Rovers	1975–76	Fourth Division	43	9	1	0	5	0	49	9
Doncaster Rovers	1976–77	Fourth Division	46	5	2	1	4	0	52	6
Doncaster Rovers	1977–78	Fourth Division	35	0	1	0	2	0	38	0
Doncaster Rovers	Total		124	14	4	1	11	0	139	15
Swindon Town	1978–79	Third Division	44	3	4	0	4	2	52	5
Swindon Town	1979–80	Third Division	40	2	6	2	11	0	57	4
Swindon Town	1980–81	Third Division	43	4	2	0	5	0	50	4
Swindon Town	Total		127	9	12	2	20	2	159	13
Blackburn Rovers	1981–82	Second Division	42	3	1	0	3	0	46	3
Blackburn Rovers	1982–83	Second Division	32	4	1	0	1	0	34	4
Blackburn Rovers	1983–84	Second Division	36	3	1	0	2	1	39	4
Blackburn Rovers	1984–85	Second Division	38	4	4	0	2	0	44	4
Blackburn Rovers	1985–86	Second Division	38	1	3	0	1	0	42	1
Blackburn Rovers	1986–87	Second Division	28	0	1	0	4	1	33	1
Blackburn Rovers	1987–88	Second Division	23	0	0	0	2	0	25	0
Blackburn Rovers	1988–89	Second Division	31	1	2	0	7	0	40	1
Blackburn Rovers	Total		268	16	13	0	22	2	303	18
Port Vale	1989–90	Second Division	21	1	0	0	3	0	24	1
Scunthorpe United	1990–91	Fourth Division	12	0	4	0	2	0	18	0
Career total			567	40	33	3	59	5	659	48

== Honours ==
Bury

- Football League Fourth Division promotion: 1973–74

Blackburn Rovers

- Full Members Cup: 1986–87

Individual

- PFA Team of the Year: 1975–76 Fourth Division, 1976–77 Fourth Division, 1977–78 Fourth Division
