= 1987 Full Members' Cup final =

Blackburn Rovers	Charlton Athletic
1	0
- Date: 29 March 1987
- Venue: Wembley Stadium, London
- Attendance: 40,000

The 1987 Full Members' Cup final was the final match of the second edition of the Full Members' Cup football tournament and was contested between First Division team Charlton Athletic and Second Division side Blackburn Rovers. The match was won 1–0 by Blackburn with the winning goal scored by Colin Hendry.

== Route to the Final ==
- Blackburn Rovers: Blackburn defeated Huddersfield Town, Sheffield United, Oxford United and Chelsea to reach the semi-finals, where they defeated Ipswich Town 3–0 to reach the final.
- Charlton Athletic: Charlton defeated Birmingham City, Bradford City and Everton to reach the semi-finals, where they defeated Norwich City 2–1 (aet) to reach the final.

== Match details ==
29 March 1987
15:00 BST

Blackburn Rovers	1–0	Charlton Athletic
Hendry 85'	Report

Wembley Stadium, London
Attendance: 40,000
Referee: Brian Stevens Gloucestershire

Blackburn Rovers	Charlton Athletic

Note: Flags indicate national team as defined under FIFA eligibility rules; some limited exceptions apply. Players may hold more than one non-FIFA nationality.

Blackburn Rovers
No.	Pos.	Nation	Player
1	GK	ENG	Vince O'Keefe
2	DF	ENG	Chris Price
3	DF	ENG	Chris Sulley
4	MF	ENG	Simon Barker
5	DF	ENG	Glenn Keeley
6	DF	ENG	David Mail
7	MF	SCO	Ian Miller
8	MF	ENG	Alan Ainscow
9	FW	SCO	Colin Hendry
10	FW	ENG	Simon Garner
11	MF	ENG	Scott Sellars
12	MF	ENG	Mark Patterson
14	DF	ENG	Jim Branagan
Manager		SCO	Don Mackay

Charlton Athletic
No.	Pos.	Nation	Player
1	GK	ENG	Bob Bolder
2	DF	ENG	John Humphrey
3	DF	SCO	Mark Reid
4	MF	ENG	Andy Peake
5	DF	ENG	Steve Thompson
6	DF	ENG	Paul Miller
7	MF	SCO	Ralph Milne
8	FW	ENG	Rob Lee
9	FW	SCO	Jim Melrose
10	MF	SCO	Colin Walsh
11	MF	ENG	George Shipley
12	MF	ENG	Steve Gritt
14	DF	ENG	Peter Shirtliff
Manager		ENG	Lennie Lawrence
