= Angus Seed =

English footballer

Personal information
- Full name: Angus Cameron Seed
- Date of birth: 6 February 1893
- Place of birth: Lanchester, England
- Date of death: 7 February 1953 (aged 60)
- Place of death: Barnsley, England
- Position: Right back

Senior career*
Years	Team	Apps	(Gls)
- Whitburn
- South Shields
- Seaham Harbour
1913	Everton	0	(0)
1914	Leicester Fosse	3	(0)
1914	Reading		
1919	St Bernard's	1	(0)
1919–	Mid Rhondda		
–1923	Ebbw Vale		
1922–1923	Broxburn United	32	(0)
- Workington

Managerial career
- Workington
- 1927–1937: Aldershot
- 1937–1953: Barnsley
- * Club domestic league appearances and goals

Angus Cameron Seed MM (6 February 1893 – 7 February 1953) was an English professional footballer, best remembered for his 16 years as manager of Barnsley in the Football League. He had a long playing career as a right back in non-League football and after retiring, he was Aldershot's first-ever manager and worked as a scout for Charlton Athletic.

== Personal life ==
Seed's younger brother Jimmy was also a professional footballer, who played for Tottenham Hotspur, Sheffield Wednesday and England. Angus Seed served in the 2nd and 17th Battalions of the Middlesex Regiment during the First World War. On the night of 1–2 June 1916, he won the Military Medal for his actions as a stretcher bearer on Vimy Ridge, dragging wounded men back to the British dugouts under heavy fire. One of the men Seed dragged back, former Arsenal assistant trainer Tom Ratcliff, later became Seed's trainer at Barnsley. Later in June 1916, Seed received a shrapnel wound in the right hip, which eventually caused him to retire from football. He died of chronic bronchitis at Kendray Hospital in Barnsley on 7 February 1953.

== Honours ==
Aldershot

- Southern League Eastern Division: 1929–30

Barnsley

- Football League Third Division North: 1938–39

== Career statistics ==
Appearances and goals by club, season and competition
Club	Season	League			National Cup		Total	
Club	Season	Division	Apps	Goals	Apps	Goals	Apps	Goals
Leicester Fosse	1913–14	Second Division	3	0	0	0	3	0
St Bernard's	1919–20	Central League	1	0	0	0	1	0
Broxburn United	1922–23	Scottish Second Division	32	0	1	0	33	0
Career total			36	0	1	0	37	0
