= Mark Reid =

Scottish footballer

Personal information
- Full name: Mark Reid
- Date of birth: 15 September 1961 (age 65)
- Place of birth: Kilwinning, Scotland
- Height: 5 ft 8 in (1.73 m)
- Position: Left back

Youth career
- Celtic Boys Club

Senior career*
Years	Team	Apps	(Gls)
1980–1985	Celtic	124	(5)
1985–1991	Charlton Athletic	211	(15)
1991–1993	St Mirren	20	(0)
Total		355	(20)

International career
1982–1984	Scotland U21	2	(0)
- * Club domestic league appearances and goals

Mark Reid (born 15 September 1961) is a Scottish retired professional footballer who played as a left back. Reid made over 350 appearances in the Scottish and English Football Leagues between 1980 and 1993.

== Club career ==
Born in Kilwinning, Reid played League football for Celtic, Charlton Athletic and St Mirren before retiring in 1993 due to injury.

Reid made his Celtic first-team debut in a 1–1 draw away to Dundee United in the first leg of the Scottish League Cup semi-final in November 1980, and subsequently established himself as Celtic's regular left back under manager Billy McNeill. His first trophy with Celtic came in April 1981 when Celtic secured the league championship with a 3-2 victory over Dundee United at Tannadice.

Whilst at Charlton he was elected for the PFA Team of the Year in the 1985–86 Football League Second Division.

== International career ==
Reid made two appearances for the Scotland Under-21 national side in European Under-21 Championship matches.

== Honours ==
Charlton Athletic

- Full Members' Cup runner-up: 1986–87
