= Karel Fraeye =

Belgian football manager

Personal information
- Full name: Karel Fraeye
- Date of birth: 16 November 1977 (age 48)
- Place of birth: Brussels, Belgium

Managerial career
- Years: Team
- 2010−2011: KSV Sottegem
- 2011−2014: Eendracht Zele
- 2014: Charlton Athletic (assistant)
- 2014−2015: VW Hamme
- 2015–2016: Charlton Athletic (interim)
- 2016: Lommel
- 2020: Roeselare
- 2020–2021: Lokeren-Temse

Karel Fraeye (born 16 November 1977) is a Belgian football manager and executive who was most recently the sporting manager for Challenger Pro League club Lokeren-Temse.

== Career ==
After almost ten years as a youth coach with Belgian Pro League club KAA Gent and FC Destelbergen, he started his senior managerial career with Belgian Second Division KSV Sottegem in 2010. After spending three years in charge and achieving two promotions of Belgian Fourth Division A club Eendracht Zele, Fraeye had a short stint as an assistant to head coach José Riga at English Championship club Charlton Athletic. By his own account, he then continued to work for Charlton's owner, Roland Duchâtelet as Sport Director for Alcorcón.

In October 2015, he was announced as interim head coach at Charlton, quitting the job he then held at Belgian Third Division club, VW Hamme. He was sacked on 13 January 2016, having won just two out of his ten matches while in charge.

In February 2016, Fraeye was appointed head coach of Belgian Second Division team Lommel, with the initial aim of preventing relegation. Fraeye succeeded in keeping Lommel up, but left the club the next season at the beginning of October, following a 3–6 home loss to Tubize, which dropped Lommel to last place.
