= Seth Plum =

English footballer

Personal information
- Full name: Seth Lewis Plum
- Date of birth: 15 July 1899
- Place of birth: Edmonton, London, England
- Date of death: 29 November 1969 (aged 70)
- Place of death: Haringey, London, England
- Position: Wing half

Senior career*
Years	Team	Apps	(Gls)
- Charlton Athletic
1924–1926	Chelsea	26	(0)
1927–1928	Southend United	10	(0)
Total		36+	(0+)

International career
1923	England	1	(0)
- * Club domestic league appearances and goals

Seth Lewis Plum (15 July 1899 – 29 November 1969) was an English international footballer who played as a wing half.

== Club career ==
Born in Edmonton, Plum played professionally for Charlton Athletic, Chelsea and Southend United.

=== Chelsea ===
The 1925–26 season was to be Plum's final season for Chelsea, ending in him featuring on nine occasions, all of which came in March and April 1926. Despite his position as a wing half, Plum left Stamford Bridge having scored no goals in 27 appearances for the club.

=== Southend United ===
On 1 July 1927, Plum joined Southend United, who were then playing in the Third Division (South). He started all of his 10 games for the Seasiders before retiring through injury at the age of 28.

== International career ==
Plum received his only cap for England at age 23 while playing for Charlton Athletic, starting and playing the full 90 minutes in a 4–1 win over France on 10 May 1923.

== Later life ==
In the early 1960s, Plum worked as a petrol pump attendant at a garage in Tottenham.
