= Steve Thompson (footballer, born 1955) =

English footballer and manager (1955–2025)

Personal information
- Full name: Steven Paul Thompson
- Date of birth: 28 July 1955
- Place of birth: Sheffield, England
- Date of death: August 2025 (aged 70)
- Height: 6 ft 1 in (1.85 m)
- Position: Centre half

Youth career
- Sheffield United

Senior career*
| Years | Team | Apps | (Gls) |
| 1975–1976 | Worksop Town | | |
| 1976–1980 | Boston United | | |
| 1980–1985 | Lincoln City | 154 | (8) |
| 1985–1988 | Charlton Athletic | 95 | (0) |
| 1988 | Leicester City | 0 | (0) |
| 1988–1989 | Sheffield United | 20 | (1) |
| 1989–1990 | Lincoln City | 27 | (0) |

Managerial career
- 1990–1993: Lincoln City
- 1995: Southend United
- 1998: Sheffield United
- 2004–2005: Cambridge United
- 2006–2007: Notts County
- * Club domestic league appearances and goals

Steven Paul Thompson (28 July 1955 – August 2025) was an English football player and coach. His management career included spells at Lincoln City, Southend United, Sheffield United and Cambridge United.

== Coaching career ==
In December 2004 Thompson was appointed manager of struggling League Two side Cambridge United, but was made redundant the following summer having failed to prevent Cambridge's relegation to the Conference.

He then worked for BBC Radio Lincolnshire. On 12 June 2006, he was appointed manager of Notts County on a three-year deal which was extended by one year in May 2007, the appointment was an unpopular decision among many County fans because of his association with the Colin Murphy era.

After leaving Notts County Thompson did not make a return in football within any capacity, though in the Summer of 2009, he went public with his interest for the Port Vale job – which later went to Micky Adams. He had previously lost out to the job in October 2007 to Lee Sinnott.

He was a summariser for BBC Radio Lincolnshire on Lincoln City games.

He was forced to undergo some training by BBC Radio Lincolnshire in late 2020 for repeatedly using offensive phrases on air.

== Death ==
Thompson died in August 2025, at the age of 70.

== Honours ==
Charlton Athletic

- Full Members' Cup runner-up: 1986–87
