= Thomas Sandgaard =

Colorado-based Danish entrepreneur and inventor

- Born: Denmark
- Education: MBA
- Alma mater: Copenhagen Business School
- Occupations: Entrepreneur, inventor
- Years active: 1996-present
- Known for: Charlton Athletic, Zynex Inc

Thomas Sandgaard is a Danish entrepreneur and inventor based out of Colorado. Sandgaard is the founder and CEO of Zynex Inc.

== Career ==
Sandgaard was born and raised in Denmark. He obtained his BSc in electrical and electronics engineering from University of Southern Denmark. He graduated from Copenhagen Business School with an MBA degree in marketing. In 1996, he moved to the United States and later in 2018, he gained US citizenship.In 1996, he founded Zynex Inc. and in August 2018, he founded The Sandgaard Foundation with a goal to end the opioid epidemic and save lives from opioid overdose.

In September 2020, Sandgaard acquired Charlton Athletic Football Club. In February 2021, Sandgaard also made a deal to acquire Charlton Athletic Women's Football Club, bringing both clubs under the same ownership for the first time since 2007. On 21 July 2023, Sandgaard sold both clubs to Global Football Partners.

In January 2026, a federal grand jury in the US indicted Sandgaard with medical and securities fraud in relation to Zynex’s billing practices.

== Patents obtained by Thomas Sandgaard ==
- Method and apparatus for non-invasively detecting blood volume imbalances in a mammalian subject (20190150761), 2019
- Methods and apparatus for estimating a blood volume of a mammalian subject (20120016246), 2012
- Electromyogram-triggered neuromuscular stimulation device and method (20050113883), 2005
