= Zynex =

Medical device manufacturer

Zynex, Inc.
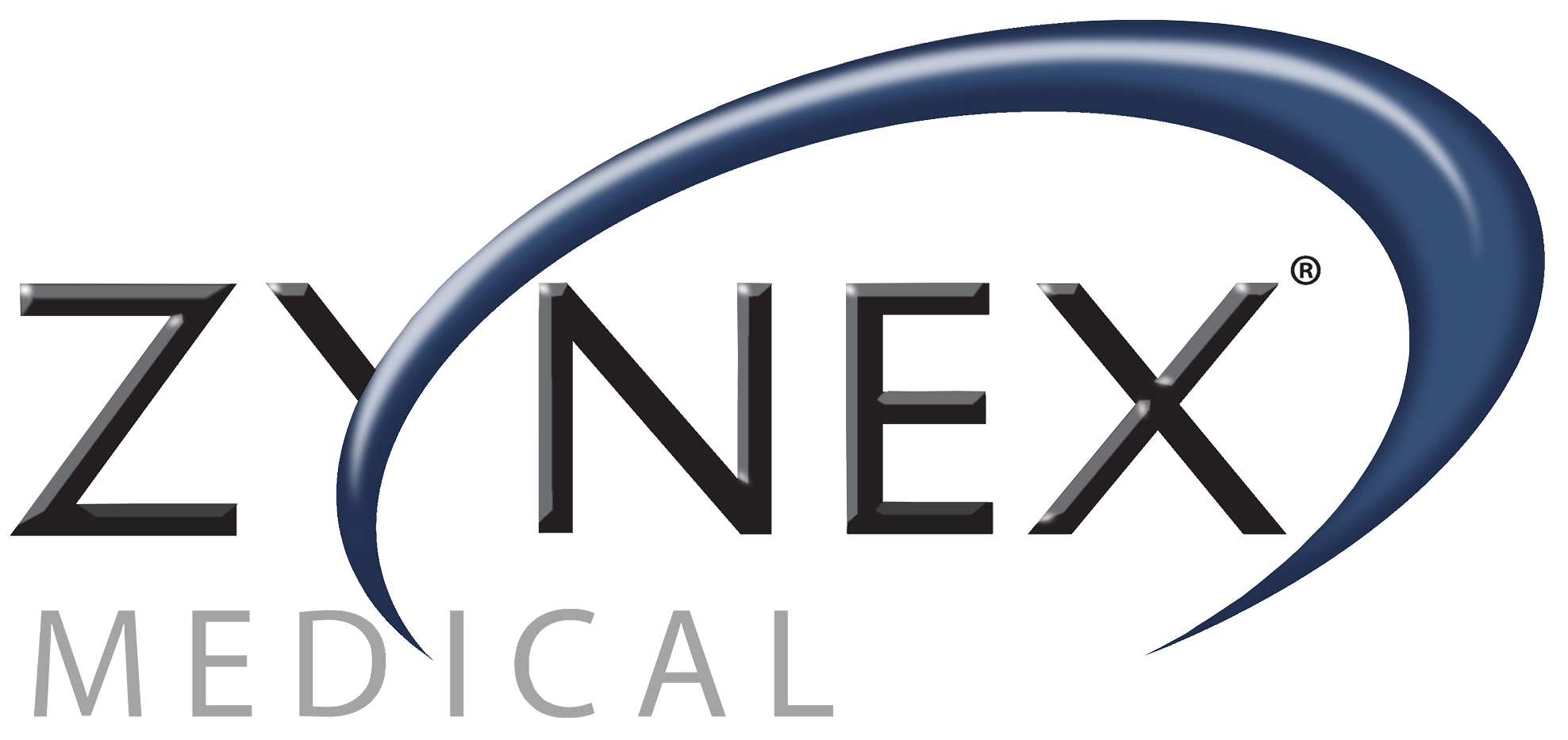
- Company type: Public
- Traded as: Nasdaq: ZYXI
- Industry: Medical Technology
- Founded: 1996
- Founder: Thomas Sandgaard
- Headquarters: Meridian, Colorado, U.S.
- Products: Medical devices
- Revenue: ▲US$158.2 million (2022)
- Net income: ▲US$17 million (2022)
- Number of employees: ▲1100 (2023)
- Subsidiaries: Zynex Medical, Inc. Zynex Neurodiagnostics, Inc. Zynex Monitoring Solutions, Inc. Zynex Billing and Consulting, LLC; Zynex Europe ApS.
- Website: zynex.com

Zynex, Inc. is a medical device manufacturer that produces and markets electrotherapy devices for use in pain management, physical rehabilitation, neurological diagnosis and cardiac monitoring. Thomas Sandgaard founded Zynex Medical in 1996.

The company is based in unincorporated Douglas County, Colorado. Thomas Sandgaard serves as the company's CEO.

== History ==
In 1996, Thomas Sandgaard founded Zynex Medical as a wholesaler of electrotherapy products. Sandgaard began working with medical devices in his native Denmark and immigrated to the United States with plans to open a medical devices business. He launched his company in a one-bedroom apartment with $4,000 and a credit card. In 1998, the company received its first Food and Drug Administration approval for one of its products, “an electric-stimulation device that managed pain and increased blood circulation to promote healing.”

The company went public in 2004. In 2008, the company changed its name from Zynex Medical Holdings to Zynex and began trading on the OTC Bulletin Board under the symbol ZYXI. It relocated from Lone Tree, Colorado to Englewood, Colorado in early 2018.

In February 2010, Zynex restructured its business into three subsidiaries: Zynex Medical, Zynex Monitoring Solutions and Zynex NeuroDiagnostic. Zynex Medical manufactures electrotherapy devices for pain management and physical rehabilitation; Zynex Monitoring Solutions manufactures devices for non-invasive cardiac monitoring; and Zynex NeuroDiagnostic manufactures devices for neurological diagnosis.

In March 2012, Zynex Medical acquired the assets of NeuroDyne Medical. NeuroDyne Medical was a Cambridge, Massachusetts-based manufacturer of “medical devices for non-invasive measurement of surface electromyography and autonomic nervous systems.” NeuroDyne Medical was folded into Zynex's NeuroDiagnostic subsidiary.

In February 2019, Zynex Medical began trading on Nasdaq under the symbol ZYXI.

In February 2020, Zynex received FDA clearance for their CM-1500 Cardiac Monitor.

In December 2025, Zynex filed for Chapter 11 bankruptcy protection in an effort to receive new financing from its lenders and resolve pending federal investigations into its billing practices. Zynex admitted to participating in a conspiracy to commit health care fraud, securities fraud, mail fraud, and other violations in a February 2026 court filing to enter into a non-prosecution agreement.

== See also ==
- Electrotherapy
- Physical medicine and rehabilitation
- Cardiac monitoring
- Class II Medical devices
