= Albert Lindon =

English footballer and manager

Albert Lindon (1891–1976) was a football player and manager.

As a goalkeeper Lindon played a single game for Aston Villa, a 2-1 defeat away to Spurs on 23 March 1912.He was the 891th player to represent the club.

Lindon was a goalkeeper who played for Merthyr Town but was signed by Charlton Athletic as a player-manager after Alex MacFarlane's departure to Dundee in January 1928. Lindon only won one of his eleven games in charge, and became assistant manager when MacFarlane returned in summer 1928. In 1932 Lindon became manager again but was unable to prevent Charlton's relegation from the Second Division to the Third Division in 1933, and was replaced by Jimmy Seed.
