= Bob Bolder =

English footballer (born 1958)

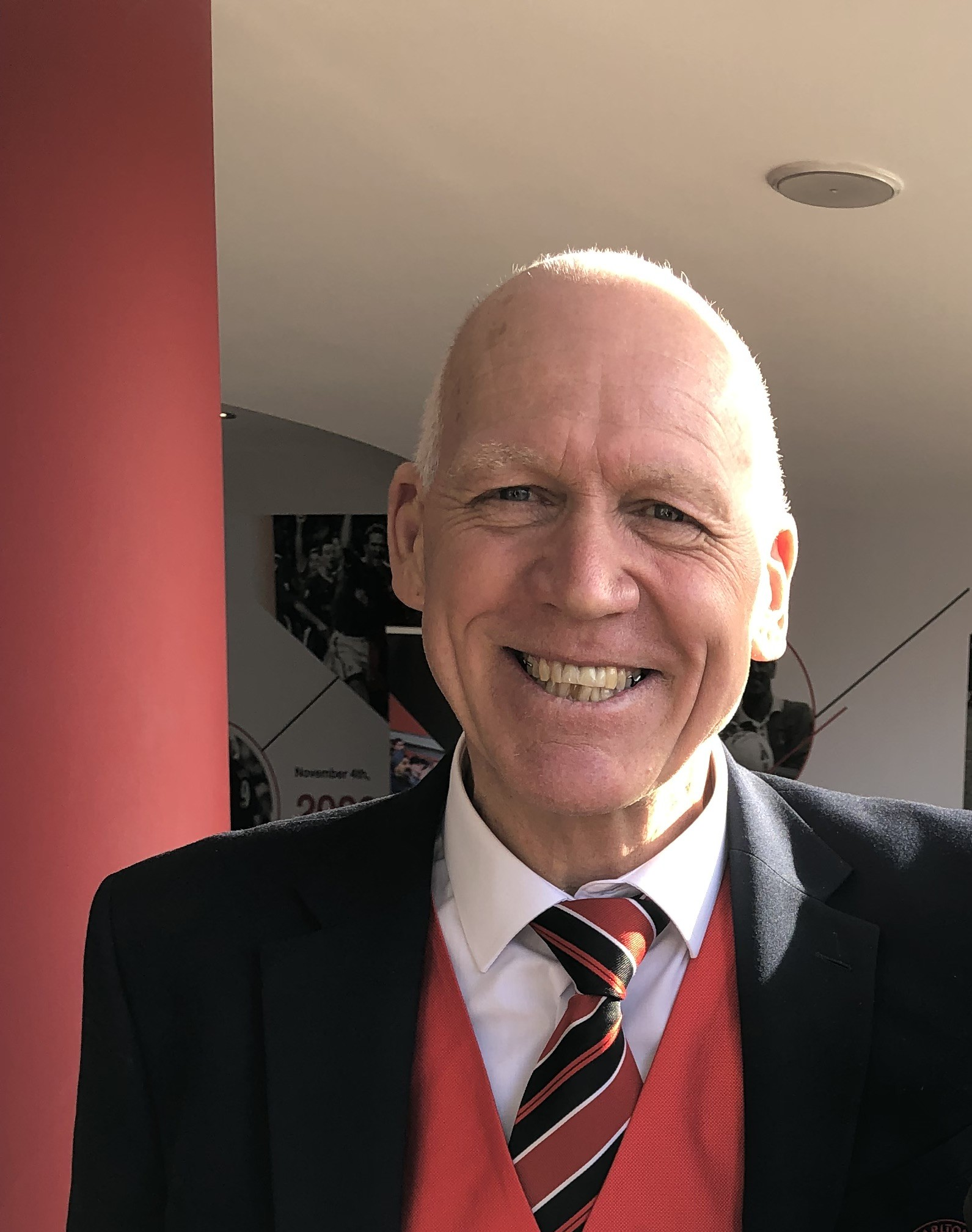
- Bolder in 2025.

Personal information
- Full name: Robert John Bolder
- Date of birth: 2 October 1958 (age 68)
- Place of birth: Dover, England
- Height: 6 ft 1 in (1.85 m)
- Position: Goalkeeper

Youth career
- Dover

Senior career*
Years	Team	Apps	(Gls)
1977–1983	Sheffield Wednesday	196	(0)
1983–1985	Liverpool	0	(0)
1985–1986	Sunderland	22	(0)
1986–1993	Charlton Athletic	249	(0)
1994	Margate	?	(0)
1994–1995	Dagenham & Redbridge	31	(0)
Total		498	(0)
- * Club domestic league appearances and goals

Robert John Bolder (born 2 October 1958) is an English former footballer who played as a goalkeeper.

He started his career with local team Dover before moving to Sheffield Wednesday at the age of 19. He played over 200 games whilst at Hillsborough. In 1983, he started a two-year stint as backup for Bruce Grobbelaar at Liverpool, where he won the European Cup in 1984 as an unusued substitute in the final.

He left Liverpool in 1985 for a brief spell with Sunderland before joining Charlton Athletic a year later. He established himself as first choice keeper for the Addicks for seven years. He was forced to retire from professional football in 1993 and had spells in non-league football with Margate and Dagenham & Redbridge. He has since returned to Charlton as part of their work in the community scheme. He regularly plays in goal for the Liverpool Masters team.

== Honours ==
Liverpool

- European Cup: 1983–84

Charlton Athletic

- Full Members' Cup runner-up: 1986–87
