= Les Gore =

English footballer (1914–1991)

Personal information
- Full name: Frederick Leslie Gore
- Date of birth: 21 January 1914
- Place of birth: Coventry, England
- Date of death: 22 January 1991 (aged 77)
- Place of death: Buckhurst Hill, England
- Height: 5 ft 8 in (1.73 m)
- Position: Outside right

Senior career*
| Years | Team | Apps | (Gls) |
- Morris Motor Works
| 1935–1936 | Fulham | 0 | (0) |
| 1936–1937 | Stockport County | 7 | (1) |
| 1937–1938 | Carlisle United | 3 | (0) |
| 1938–1939 | Bradford City | 33 | (8) |
| 1939–1946 | Clapton Orient | 0 | (0) |
| 1946–1948 | Yeovil Town | | |
| 1948–1949 | Gillingham | 15 | (2) |
- Gravesend & Northfleet

Managerial career
- 1956: Leyton Orient (interim)
- 1959–1961: Leyton Orient
- 1964: Leyton Orient (caretaker)
- 1974: Charlton Athletic (caretaker)
- * Club domestic league appearances and goals

Frederick Leslie Gore (21 January 1914 – 22 January 1991) was an English professional footballer who played in the Football League for Bradford City, Stockport County and Carlisle United as an outside right. He served Leyton Orient as a player, manager and trainer for over 20 years and scouted for Charlton Athletic and Millwall.

== Career statistics ==
Appearances and goals by club, season and competition
| Club | Season | League | | | FA Cup | | Other | | Total | |
| Club | Season | Division | Apps | Goals | Apps | Goals | Apps | Goals | Apps | Goals |
|---|---|---|---|---|---|---|---|---|---|---|
| Stockport County | 1936–37 | Third Division North | 7 | 1 | 0 | 0 | 3 (Note: Appearances in Third Division North Cup) | 0 | 10 | 1 |
| Clapton Orient | 1945–46 | ― | | | 1 | 1 | ― | | 1 | 1 |
| Gillingham | 1948–49 | Southern League | 15 | 2 | 1 | 0 | 3 (Note: Appearances in Southern League Cup) | 0 | 19 | 2 |
| Career total | | | 22 | 3 | 2 | 1 | 6 | 0 | 30 | 4 |

== Honours ==
Gillingham

- Southern League: 1948–49

== Sources ==
- Frost, Terry (1988). Bradford City A Complete Record 1903–1988. Breedon Books Sport. pp. 382, 396. ISBN 0-907969-38-0.
