= Jack Ashurst =

Scottish footballer (born 1954)

Personal information
- Date of birth: 12 October 1954 (age 72)
- Place of birth: Renton, Scotland
- Height: 6 ft 0 in (1.83 m)
- Position: Defender

Senior career*
Years	Team	Apps	(Gls)
1972–1979	Sunderland	140	(4)
1979–1981	Blackpool	53	(3)
1981–1986	Carlisle United	194	(2)
1986–1989	Leeds United	89	(1)
1988–1992	Doncaster Rovers	139	(2)
19??	→ Bridlington Town (loan)		
1992–1993	Rochdale	1	(1)
1993–19??	Frickley Athletic		
Total		616	(13)
- * Club domestic league appearances and goals

John Ashurst (born 12 October 1954) is a Scottish former professional footballer. He played as a defender.

== Biography ==
Ashurst spent the first seven years of his career with Sunderland, making 140 league appearances for the Roker Park club. In October 1979, he was signed by Stan Ternent's Blackpool for £132,400, breaking the Lancashire club's record transfer fee in the process.

Ashurst made his debut the following month, in a draw at Gillingham, replacing the veteran Peter Suddaby at centre-half.

Over the course of the next season or so, Ashurst was used as a utility player, but then suffered a series of injuries which limited his appearances.

On 21 February 1981, Ashurst scored the only goal of the game in Blackpool's league victory over Walsall at Bloomfield Road.

When former Blackpool player Allan Brown rejoined the club in a managerial capacity, he sold Ashurst to Carlisle United for £40,000 in August 1981. He went on to play for Leeds United, Doncaster Rovers and Rochdale, before moving into non-League football with Frickley Athletic with over 600 league appearances to his name. He retired from playing in the mid-1990s.
