= Walter Rayner =

English football manager (1882–1958)

Walter Rayner (10 April 1882 – 2 October 1958) was a British football manager and player. He served as Charlton Athletic's first full-time manager from June 1920, when the club played in the Southern League, to May 1925, when the club played in the Football League. He became manager of Wigan Borough in October 1925.

Rayner had been recruited by Charlton from Tottenham Hotspur, where he was a player-coach. He had also been a player-coach at Arsenal. During his career as a player, he played for Norwich City. In 1909, he was the reserve team captain at Luton Town.

In February 1926, a dispute with a referee and opposing players led to Rayner's suspension by Wigan. He was later permanently banned from football management after an enquiry into financial irregularities at Charlton. After his football career, he was the proprietor of a hardware shop in Croydon.
