= Jimmy Seed =

English footballer and manager

Personal information
- Full name: James Marshall Seed
- Date of birth: 25 March 1895
- Place of birth: Blackhill, England
- Date of death: 16 July 1966 (aged 71)
- Place of death: Farnborough, London, England
- Height: 5 ft 10 1/2 in (1.79 m)
- Position: Inside forward

Youth career
- 19??–1914: Whitburn
- 1914–1919: Sunderland

Senior career*
Years	Team	Apps	(Gls)
1919–1920	Mid Rhondda		
1920–1927	Tottenham Hotspur	229	(64)
1926–1931	Sheffield Wednesday	134	(32)
Total		363	(96)

International career
1921–1925	England	5	(1)

Managerial career
- 1931–1933: Clapton Orient
- 1933–1956: Charlton Athletic
- 1958–1959: Millwall
- * Club domestic league appearances and goals

James Marshall Seed (25 March 1895 – 16 July 1966) was an English footballer and football manager.

== Early life ==
Despite being born in Blackhill, Seed was brought up in the village of Whitburn on the coast just to the north of Sunderland, the family moving when Seed was two years old.

Jimmy was the younger brother of English footballer Angus Seed.

== Playing career ==
Upon leaving school at the age of fourteen, Seed worked at Whitburn colliery. When he reached sixteen he played football in the Wearside League for Whitburn, along with his brother Angus who would go on to have a short professional career with Leicester Fosse. After scoring over eighty goals for Whitburn, Seed had unsuccessful trials at South Shields and Sunderland. However, Sunderland manager Bob Kyle decided to give Seed a second chance, this time playing him at inside right instead of centre forward in a North Eastern League match against Wallsend. Seed scored a hat-trick in the match and was promptly signed by Sunderland as a professional in April 1914.

=== Sunderland and First World War ===
Seed spent the 1914–15 season playing in Sunderland reserves, he scored many goals as the team lifted the Durham Senior Cup. Competitive league football was suspended at the end of that season because of the outbreak of World War I. At the end of the season, the 20-year-old Seed joined the Army Cyclist Corps. In the summer of 1916, he was drafted to France with the 8th battalion of the West Yorkshire Regiment. In July 1917 Seed was gassed when a German aeroplane dropped mustard gas bombs over Nieuwpoort, Belgium. Seed was with other soldiers sheltering in the basement of a bombed out building when the gas seeped in. Over fifty of his comrades died in the incident. He was sent to England to convalesce and returned to France in August 1918, until being evacuated after again being gassed in Valenciennes, France two months later. With the cessation of hostilities, Seed played a Victory League match for Sunderland against Durham City in 1918, however his lungs were weak, resulting in a poor performance. Following which, the Sunderland directors decided that Seed's wartime experience had finished him as a footballer and released him. They did not put him on the transfer list as they believed his lungs were too damaged to continue playing. Seed never played an official first team game for Sunderland. He was discharged from the army in March 1919.

=== Mid Rhondda ===
Seed's football career was rescued by former Wales international Haydn Price, the manager of Welsh non-League team Mid Rhondda, who were based in the town of Tonypandy. Price offered Seed a chance to play for the south Wales club, which Seed accepted, and he signed for them in July 1919. Seed joined former England international Joseph Bache and ex-teammate from Sunderland Frank Pattison in the Mid-Rhondda side and they had a successful time in the seven months that Seed was with them, winning both the Southern League Division Two and Welsh League titles. Seed's good form attracted the attention of Tottenham Hotspur manager Peter McWilliam, and in January 1920 he signed for the north London side for a fee of £250, a move which caused some antagonism amongst supporters in Tonypandy.

=== Tottenham Hotspur ===
After initially playing five games in the reserves Seed got his first team chance with Spurs, making his debut at inside right and forming an immediate understanding with the legendary, diminutive right winger Fanny Walden. Seed played five games in the remainder of the 1919–20 season, scoring two goals as Spurs ran away with the Second Division title. Seed was a virtual ever present for Spurs in the following seven seasons in the First Division. The 1920–21 season saw Tottenham lift the FA Cup, with Seed playing in all six matches in the cup run, scoring five goals, including a hat trick against Bradford City in the second round. Just two months after getting his cup winners medal Seed was called up for the first of this five England caps on 21 May 1921 against Belgium, he never got a long run in the international side, playing his final game in April 1925.

The 1921–22 season saw Tottenham finish runners up to Liverpool in the First Division, with Seed scoring ten goals in 36 appearances. In February 1927 Peter McWilliam resigned as Spurs manager, being replaced by Billy Minter. Minter decided that the 32-year-old Seed was reaching the end of his career, and with a young Taffy O'Callaghan ready to take his place, he cut Seed's wages from £8 to £7 a week. Seed requested to be released by the club at the end of the 1926–27 season and despite showing interest in taking the player/manager job at Aldershot, he eventually signed for The Wednesday in a part exchange deal involving Darkie Lowdell and a cash adjustment paid by Spurs.

=== Sheffield Wednesday ===
Seed made his Wednesday debut on 27 August 1927, in the first match of the 1927–28 season against Everton. During the first part of the season Seed was asked to play in numerous different positions by manager Bob Brown as Wednesday struggled in the First Division. By March 1928 they had won only six matches out of 32, and were seven points adrift at the foot of the table. At that stage Seed was made team captain with existing skipper Fred Keen being dropped, Ellis Rimmer was bought from Tranmere Rovers and these changes triggered an amazing recovery. Wednesday picked up seventeen points from a possible twenty in the last ten matches and avoided relegation by a point. Ironically, Seed's former club Tottenham were relegated on the final day of the season.

By his own admission, Seed did not play his best football of his career at Wednesday, but his experience and know-how as captain was the catalyst that drove a young and talented Wednesday side to two successive First Division championships in the following two seasons (1928–29 and 1929–30), making this the most successful period in the club's history. He played in Sheffield Wednesday's 2–1 defeat by Arsenal in the Charity Shield at Stamford Bridge in October 1930. Seed spent four seasons at Hillsborough, but by the 1930–31 season, aged 35, he was badly hampered by a knee injury and was often limping before the end of the games. He often played even though he was not fully fit, because of his talismanic influence on the team. After damaging the ligaments in his right knee in a match against Newcastle United during Christmas of 1930, he realised his playing days were numbered, and retired at the end of the 1930–31 season. His last match was the 4 April 4-0 win at Blackpool during which he exacerbated an old knee injury. He then took up an offer from Arsenal manager Herbert Chapman to manage Clapton Orient (which Chapman intended to become Arsenal's nursery club).

He played for the "Professionals" in the 1929 FA Charity Shield.

== Managerial career ==
=== Clapton Orient ===
Seed began his managerial career at Clapton Orient. Seed commenced the job at £12 a week but within a short time Arsenal were forced to abandon their plans after being told by the Football League that they were acting unlawfully. Without the financial backing of Arsenal, Orient had very little money and the team struggled. In Seed's first season as manager the team finished 16th, and then in the following 1932–33 campaign they avoided having to seek re-election on goal average. In May 1933 he accepted the offer of the manager's job at Charlton Athletic, despite Sheffield Wednesday trying to tempt Seed back to Hillsborough as a replacement for the manager Bob Brown.

=== Charlton Athletic ===
Between 1933 and 1936 he led Charlton to successive promotions from the Third Division to the First Division. In Charlton's first season in the top-flight, they finished runners-up behind Manchester City in 1937. They finished third and fourth in the following two seasons before the outbreak of World War II.

He led the team into a variety of regional competitions set up during the war and Charlton reached a Wembley final for the first time in 1943. They were beaten 7–1 by Arsenal in the War Cup. They were more successful in 1944, when captain Don Welsh lifted the trophy following a 3–1 triumph over Chelsea.

They contested the first two post-war FA Cup finals at Wembley, which were noted for the ball bursting on both occasions. They were well beaten 4–1 by Derby County in 1946, but a Chris Duffy goal beat Burnley 1–0 in 1947.

Despite the revenues generated by very large home attendances, Charlton refused to allow Seed to invest in new players (he "discovered" Stanley Matthews but was not allowed to sign him) and so Charlton were unable to repeat their pre-war success in the First Division, finishing no higher than ninth in the initial six seasons after the conflict. They narrowly avoided relegation in 1949–50 with a 20th position finish, but they finished fifth in 1952–53. Following two lower mid-table finishes, Charlton, with key defenders missing through injury, endured a poor start to the 1956–57 season, losing their first five matches, before Seed was sacked on 3 September 1956. To avoid a backlash from supporters, Seed was asked to publicly announce he had retired due to ill health.

The South Stand at The Valley, Charlton's home ground, is named The Jimmy Seed Stand in Seed's honour.

=== Later career ===
After Charlton had turned down his request to become a director, he became an advisor at Bristol City in January 1957. He took over as caretaker manager in January 1958 for a short while after Pat Beasley had left the club. When new Bristol City boss Peter Doherty took over, Seed moved to manage Millwall in the early months of 1958. He got off to a terrible start at The Den, going nine matches without a win. The team eventually finished 23rd in the Third Division South, having to apply for re-election. The following season saw Millwall playing in the new Fourth Division, eventually finishing 9th. Seed stepped down as Millwall manager at the end of the 1958–59 campaign, but stayed with the club as advisor and then as a club director. He continued as a director of Millwall until his death on 16 July 1966, aged 71.

== Career statistics ==
=== International ===
Appearances and goals by national team and year
National team	Year	Apps	Goals
England	1921	1	0
England	1922	1	0
England	1923	2	1
England	1925	1	0
Total		5	1

England score listed first, score column indicates score after each Seed goal

List of international goals scored by Jimmy Seed
No.	Date	Venue	Cap	Opponent	Score	Result	Competition	Ref.
1	19 March 1923	Arsenal Stadium, London, England	4	Belgium	5–1	6–1	Friendly	

== Honours ==
Tottenham Hotspur

- Football League Second Division: 1919–20
- FA Cup: 1920–21
