= José Riga =

Belgian football manager (born 1957)

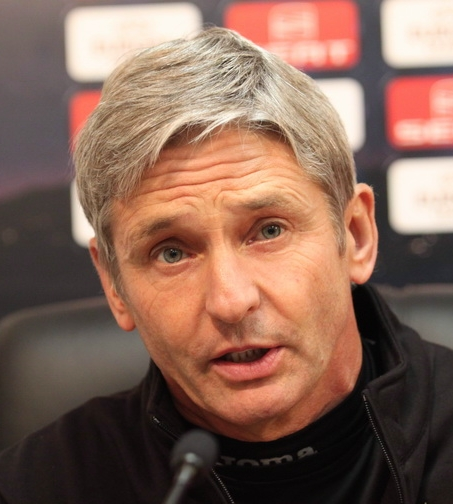
- Riga in 2011

Personal information
- Date of birth: 30 July 1957 (age 69)
- Place of birth: Liège, Belgium
- Position: Midfielder

Senior career*
Years	Team	Apps	(Gls)
1974–1985	Visé		
1985–1989	JS Haccourt		

Managerial career
- 1991–1996: JS Haccourt
- 1996–2000: Espanola Liège
- 2000–2002: Visé
- 2002–2003: Sprimont Comblain Sport
- 2005–2008: Mons
- 2011–2012: Standard Liège
- 2014: Charlton Athletic
- 2014: Blackpool
- 2015: Standard Liège
- 2015: Metz
- 2016: Charlton Athletic
- 2016–2017: Cercle Brugge
- 2018: Club Africain
- 2019–2022: Visé
- 2022: JS Kabylie
- * Club domestic league appearances and goals

José Riga (born 30 July 1957) is a Belgian football manager and former player. He had a fifteen-year playing career as a midfielder, beginning in 1974 when he joined C.S. Visé. He remained with the club for eleven years, before joining fellow Belgian club JS Haccourt in 1985. He played for JS Haccourt for four years. Two years after retiring from playing, he became JS Haccourt's manager.

Riga managed JS Haccourt for five years, departing in 1996. He then managed Espanola Liège (1996–2000), Visé (2000–2002), Sprimont Comblain Sport (2002–2003), Mons (2005–2008) and Standard Liège (2011–2012).

In 2014, he began a year of managing in England, firstly with Charlton Athletic, then Blackpool. In 2015, he returned to Standard Liège briefly, then managed Metz. In 2016, he returned to Charlton Athletic.

Later in 2016, he managed Cercle Brugge, then Club Africain (2018), Visé (2019–2022) and JS Kabylie (2022), his last known club.

== Managerial career ==
=== Charlton Athletic ===
Riga was appointed manager of Charlton Athletic on 11 March 2014, one day after the sacking of Chris Powell, who had been dismissed when he and the club owner were unable to reach agreement over the long-term vision for the club. At the time Charlton were fourth from bottom of the Championship. Riga was appointed head coach with a contract until the end of the 2013–14 season; the main task was to avoid relegation. This was achieved on 29 April 2014 following a 3–1 home win against Watford.

=== Blackpool ===
On 3 June 2014, it was reported that Riga had agreed to a deal to become manager of Blackpool, and was set to start the following week. The following day, club chairman Karl Oyston confirmed that there was a verbal agreement in place, and on 11 June he was confirmed as the new manager. Three weeks later, newspaper reports claimed that Riga was unsettled and ready to quit. Whilst the club and Riga did not comment, no coaching staff had been appointed and even though the club had seven contracted players, no signings had been made. With so few players, no assistant or backroom staff appointed, and the squad due to report back on 30 June, Riga had to delay the start of pre-season training.

On 9 July it was confirmed that, with eight players at the club, Riga had three backroom staff, all of whom had agreed to start working the previous week but had still not signed contracts. Two days later it was stated that tensions were high at the club, and between Riga and Oyston. On 17 July, having already cancelled a pre-season trip to Spain to focus on signings, it was claimed that Riga's future was even more uncertain following reports of a dispute with the chairman over transfer policy. Two days later, Blackpool played a friendly away against Northern League Division One side Penrith, fielding five triallists in the starting line-up with two more on the substitutes bench and with six fit registered players, the rest of the match day squad was made up of youth-team players. Riga was given a standing ovation by the Blackpool fans. Then after the match it was reported that when the media requested to speak with Riga, he had told his staff and players not to give any interviews.

Having won one of fifteen games in charge, Riga was sacked by Blackpool on 27 October 2014. He became the club's second-shortest-serving manager in their history, behind Michael Appleton.

=== Standard Liège ===
On 2 February 2015, Riga returned to Standard Liège in Belgium, where he was re-appointed manager following Ivan Vukomanović's departure. He took charge of his first game four days later, winning 3–0 against Mouscron. Towards the end of the season, he announced he would not be prolonging his contract. Slavoljub Muslin was announced as his successor on 5 June.

=== Return to Charlton Athletic ===
On 14 January 2016, Riga was appointed head coach of Charlton Athletic for the second time. His first win came away at Rotherham United in a 4–1 victory. He resigned following relegation and was replaced by Russell Slade.

=== Cercle Brugge ===
Riga was appointed head coach at Cercle Brugge in the Belgian First Division B on 1 November 2016, but was sacked in October 2017.

=== URSL Visé ===
On 14 October 2019, Riga was appointed sporting director of URSL Visé.

=== JS Kabylie ===
On 22 June 2022, Riga was appointed head coach of JS Kabylie. On 6 September, he was sacked.

== Managerial statistics ==
As of 7 May 2016

Team	Nat	From	To	Record				
Team	Nat	From	To	P	W	D	L	Win %
Mons	Belgium	6 June 2005	28 January 2008	92	35	22	35	38.04
Standard Liège	Belgium	28 June 2011	13 May 2012	46	23	14	9	50.00
Charlton Athletic	England	11 March 2014	27 May 2014	16	7	3	6	43.75
Blackpool	England	11 June 2014	27 October 2014	15	1	3	11	6.67
Standard Liège	Belgium	2 February 2015	5 June 2015	15	7	2	6	46.67
Metz	France	June 2015	December 2015	23	10	6	7	43.48
Charlton Athletic	England	January 2016	7 May 2016	20	5	5	10	25.00
Total				227	88	55	84	38.77
