= Ken Craggs =

Former British assistant football manager

Kenneth Craggs was an assistant football manager, and, briefly, a manager. He has held various coaching and scouting roles within the game. Craggs served as assistant manager to Alan Mullery at Brighton and Hove Albion, as the Seagulls climbed from Division Three to Division One. He followed Mullery to Charlton Athletic in 1981, and took over the manager's job after Mullery left a year later.

Craggs was in charge when Charlton signed Danish international and former European Footballer of the Year, Allan Simonsen, although he also oversaw the sale of Paul Walsh, Viggo Jacobsen and Steve Harrison. He won his first game in charge 2-1 at Leicester City, but managed just four more wins in the opening 15 games of the season. After a 5-1 home defeat to Rotherham United he was told his job was safe by chairman Mark Hulyer, but was sacked two days later.

Craggs returned to Brighton as a scout for manager Jimmy Melia. He later scouted for Brian Horton at Manchester City, Huddersfield Town and Brighton.

Craggs is now a youth scout for Hull City.

== Death ==
On the 10th. July, 2021, Charlton F.C. posted on Twitter the news of his death, aged 85.
