= 1986–87 Full Members' Cup =

Tournament details
- Country: England
- Teams: 36

Final positions
- Champions: Blackburn Rovers (1st title)
- Runners-up: Charlton Athletic
- Semifinalists: Ipswich Town; Norwich City

Tournament statistics
- Matches played: 35
- Goals scored: 110 (3.14 per match)

The 1986–87 Full Members' Cup was the second edition of the tournament created to compensate for the ban on English clubs from European football following the Heysel Stadium disaster. It was won by Blackburn Rovers, who beat Charlton Athletic 1–0 in the final at Wembley.

The Following teams opted out of this competition: Liverpool, Tottenham, Arsenal, Luton Town, Nottingham Forest, Manchester United, Queens Park Rangers and Leicester City.

== First round ==
16 September 1986	Huddersfield Town (2)	1–2 (a.e.t.)	Blackburn Rovers (2)	Leeds Road

16 September 1986	Ipswich Town (2)	3–2	Plymouth Argyle (2)	Portman Road

16 September 1986	Oldham Athletic (2)	0–1	Derby County (2)	Boundary Park

16 September 1986	Portsmouth(2)	4–0	Crystal Palace (2)	Fratton Park

16 September 1986	Sunderland (2)	1–1 (a.e.t.) (8–7 p)	Barnsley (2)	Roker Park

30 September 1986	Stoke City(2)	1–2	Sheffield United(2)	Victoria Ground
	Ford

1 October 1986	Brighton & Hove Albion(2)	0–3	Birmingham City (2)	Goldstone Ground

1 October 1986	Leeds United(2)	0–1 (a.e.t.)	Bradford City(2)	Elland Road

21 October 1986	Grimsby Town(2)	1–3	Hull City(2)	Blundell Park

21 October 1986	Millwall(2)	2–0	West Bromwich Albion(2)	The Den

4 November 1986	Shrewsbury Town(2)	0–1	Reading(2)	Gay Meadow

== Second round ==
4 November 1986	Blackburn Rovers(2)	1–0	Sheffield United(2)	Ewood Park

4 November 1986	Bradford City(2)	3–2	Sunderland(2)	Valley Parade

4 November 1986	Charlton Athletic(1)	3–2	Birmingham City (2)	Selhurst Park

4 November 1986	Manchester City(1)	3–1	Wimbledon (1)	Maine Road

4 November 1986	Norwich City(1)	2–1	Coventry City (1)	Carrow Road

4 November 1986	Portsmouth(2)	3–2 (a.e.t.)	Millwall(2)	Fratton Park

12 November 1986	Aston Villa(1)	4–1	Derby County(2)	Villa Park

25 November 1986	Reading (2)	0–2	Ipswich Town(2)	Elm Park

25 November 1986	Southampton(1)	2–1	Hull City(2)	The Dell

== Third round ==
25 November 1986	Charlton Athletic (1)	2–0	Bradford City(2)	Selhurst Park

25 November 1986	Sheffield Wednesday (1)	0–1	Portsmouth (2)	Hillsborough Stadium

25 November 1986	West Ham United(1)	1–2	Chelsea (1)	Boleyn Ground

26 November 1986	Manchester City (1)	1–0	Watford(1)	Maine Road

2 December 1986	Ipswich Town(2)	1–0	Aston Villa (1)	Portman Road

3 December 1986	Everton (1)	5–2	Newcastle United (1)	Goodison Park

9 December 1986	Southampton (1)	1–2 (a.e.t.)	Norwich City (1)	The Dell

20 January 1987	Blackburn Rovers (2)	4–3	Oxford United (1)	Ewood Park

== Quarter-final ==
31 January 1987	Manchester City(1)	2–3	Ipswich Town(2)	Maine Road

25 February 1987	Norwich City (1)	3–1	Portsmouth (2)	Carrow Road

3 March 1987	Blackburn Rovers (2)	3–0	Chelsea (1)	Ewood Park

3 March 1987	Everton (1)	2–2 (a.e.t.) (1–3 p)	Charlton Athletic(1)	Goodison Park

== Semi-final ==
10 March 1987	Charlton Athletic(1)	2–1 (a.e.t.)	Norwich City(1)	Selhurst Park

11 March 1987	Blackburn Rovers (2)	3–0	Ipswich Town (2)	Ewood Park

== Final ==
29 March 1987	Blackburn Rovers(2)	1–0	Charlton Athletic(1)	Wembley Stadium
	Hendry 85'
