= Charlton Athletic F.C. =

Association football club in London, England

Charlton Athletic
- Full name: Charlton Athletic Football Club
- Nickname: The Addicks
- Founded: 9 June 1905; 121 years ago
- Ground: The Valley
- Capacity: 27,111
- Owner: Global Football Partners
- Chairman: Gavin Carter
- Manager: Nathan Jones
- League: EFL Championship
- 2025–26: EFL Championship, 19th of 24
- Website: cafc.co.uk
Home colours	Away colours	Third colours

Charlton Athletic Football Club is a professional association football club based in Charlton, south-east London, England. The team competes in the Championship, the second tier of English football.

Their home ground is The Valley, where the club has played since 1919. They played at The Mount in Catford during the 1923–24 season. They also played a combined seven years divided between firstly Selhurst Park, and secondly at the former Upton Park (also known as the Boleyn Ground) between 1985 and 1992, due to both their financial problems and the local council's safety concerns. The club's traditional kit consists of red shirts, white shorts and red socks. Their most commonly used nickname is The Addicks. Charlton shares local rivalries with South London clubs Crystal Palace and Millwall.

The club was founded on 9 June 1905 and turned professional in 1920. They spent one season in the Kent League and one season in the Southern League, before being invited to join the newly-formed Football League Third Division South in 1921. They won the division in the 1928–29 season, and again in 1934–35 following relegation in 1933. Charlton was promoted out of the Second Division in 1935–36, and finished second in the First Division the next season. Having been beaten finalists in 1946, they lifted the FA Cup the following year with a 1–0 victory over Burnley. The departure of Jimmy Seed in 1956, manager for 23 years, saw the club relegated out of the top-flight the following year. Relegated again in 1972, Charlton was promoted from the Third Division in 1974–75, and again in 1980–81 following relegation the previous season.

Charlton recovered from administration to secure promotion back to the First Division in 1985–86, and went on to lose in the 1987 final of the Full Members' Cup, though they won the 1987 play-off final to retain their top-flight status. Having been relegated in 1990, Charlton won the 1998 play-off final to make their debut in the Premier League. Though they were relegated the next year, manager Alan Curbishley took them back up as champions in 1999–2000. Charlton spent seven successive years in the Premier League, before suffering two relegations in three years. They topped League One with 101 points in 2011–12, but were relegated from the Championship in 2016. They were promoted again after winning the 2019 EFL League One play-off final, but were relegated a year later after finishing 22nd. The club eventually returned to the Championship in 2025, via the play-offs.

== History ==
=== Early history (1905–1946) ===
Charlton Athletic was formed on 9 June 1905 by a group of 14 to 15-year-olds in East Street, Charlton, which is now known as Eastmoor Street and no longer residential.

Contrary to some histories, the club was founded as "Charlton Athletic" and had no connection to other teams or institutions such as East St Mission, Blundell Mission or Charlton Reds; it was not founded by a church, school, employer or as a franchise for an existing ground. Charlton spent most of the years before the First World War playing in local leagues but progressing rapidly, winning successive leagues promotions eight years in a row. In 1905–06 the team played only friendly games but joined, and won, the Lewisham League Division III for the 1906–07 season. For the 1907–08 season the team contested the Lewisham League, Woolwich League and entered the Woolwich Cup. It was also around this time the Addicks nickname was first used in the local press although it may have been in use before then. In the 1908–09 season Charlton Athletic were playing in the Blackheath and District League and by 1910–11 had progressed to the Southern Suburban League. During this period Charlton Athletic won the Woolwich Cup four times, the championship of the Woolwich League three times, won the Blackheath League twice and the Southern Suburban League three times.

They became a senior side in 1913, the same year that nearby Woolwich Arsenal relocated to North London.

At the outbreak of World War I, Charlton were one of the first clubs to close down to take part in the "Greater Game" overseas. The club was reformed in 1917, playing mainly friendlies to raise funds for charities connected to the war and for the Woolwich Memorial Hospital Cup, the trophy for which Charlton donated. It had previously been the Woolwich Cup that the team had won outright following three consecutive victories.

After the war, they joined the Kent League for one season (1919–20) before becoming professional, appointing Walter Rayner as the first full-time manager. They were accepted by the Southern League and played just a single season (1920–21) before being voted into the Football League along with Aberdare Athletic. Charlton's first Football League match was against Exeter City in August 1921, which they won 1–0. In 1923, Charlton became "giant killers" in the FA Cup beating top flight sides Manchester City, West Bromwich Albion, and Preston North End before losing to eventual winners Bolton Wanderers in the Quarter-Finals. Later that year, it was proposed that Charlton merge with Catford Southend to create a larger team with bigger support. In the 1923–24 season Charlton played in Catford at The Mount stadium and wore the colours of "The Enders", light and dark blue vertical stripes. However, the move fell through and the Addicks returned to the Charlton area in 1924, returning to the traditional red and white colours in the process.

Charlton finished second bottom in the Football League in 1926 and were forced to apply for re-election which was successful. Three years later the Addicks won the Division Three championship in 1929 and they remained at the Division Two level for four years. After relegation into the Third Division south at the end of the 1932–33 season the club appointed Jimmy Seed as manager and he oversaw the most successful period in Charlton's history either side of World War II. Seed, an ex-miner who had made a career as a footballer despite suffering the effects of poison gas in the First World War, remains the most successful manager in Charlton's history. He is commemorated in the name of a stand at The Valley. Seed was an innovative thinker about the game at a time when tactical formations were still relatively unsophisticated. He later recalled "a simple scheme that enabled us to pull several matches out of the fire" during the 1934–35 season: when the team was in trouble "the centre-half was to forsake his defensive role and go up into the attack to add weight to the five forwards." The organisation Seed brought to the team proved effective and the Addicks gained successive promotions from the Third Division to the First Division between 1934 and 1936, becoming the first club to ever do so. Charlton finally secured promotion to the First Division by beating local rivals West Ham United at the Boleyn Ground, (which was also known as Upton Park), with their centre-half John Oakes playing on despite concussion and a broken nose.

In 1937, Charlton finished runners up in the First Division, in 1938 finished fourth and 1939 finished third. They were the most consistent team in the top flight of English football over the three seasons immediately before World War II. This continued during the war years and they won the Football League War Cup and appeared in finals.

=== Post-war success and fall from grace (1946–1984) ===
Charlton reached the 1946 FA Cup final, but lost 4–1 to Derby County at Wembley. Charlton's Bert Turner scored an own goal in the 80th minute before equalising for the Addicks a minute later to take them into extra time, but they conceded three further goals in the extra period. When the full league programme resumed in 1946–47 Charlton could finish only 19th in the First Division, just above the relegation spots, but they made amends with their performance in the FA Cup, reaching the 1947 FA Cup final. This time they were successful, beating Burnley 1–0, with Chris Duffy scoring the only goal of the day. In this period of renewed football attendances, Charlton became one of only 13 English football teams to average over 40,000 as their attendance during a full season. The Valley was the largest football ground in the League, drawing crowds in excess of 70,000. However, in the 1950s little investment was made either for players or to The Valley, hampering the club's growth. In 1956, the then board undermined Jimmy Seed and asked for his resignation; Charlton were relegated the following year.

Chart showing Charlton's table positions since joining the Football League

From the late 1950s until the early 1970s, Charlton remained a mainstay of the Second Division before relegation to the Third Division in 1972. It caused the team's support to drop, and even a promotion in 1975 back to the second division did little to re-invigorate the team's support and finances. In 1979–80 Charlton were relegated again to the Third Division, but won immediate promotion back to the Second Division in 1980–81. This was a turning point in the club's history leading to a period of turbulence and change including further promotion and exile. A change in management and shortly after a change in club ownership led to severe problems, such as the reckless signing of former European Footballer of the Year Allan Simonsen, and the club looked like it would go out of business.

=== The "exiled" years (1985–1992) ===
In 1984 financial matters came to a head and the club went into administration, to be reformed as Charlton Athletic (1984) Ltd. although the club's finances were still far from secure. They were forced to leave The Valley just after the start of the 1985–86 season, after its safety was criticised by Football League officials in the wake of the Bradford City stadium fire. The club began to ground-share with Crystal Palace at Selhurst Park and this arrangement looked to be for the long-term, as Charlton did not have enough funds to revamp The Valley to meet safety requirements.

Despite the move away from The Valley, Charlton were promoted to the First Division as Second Division runners-up at the end of 1985–86, and remained at this level for four years (achieving a highest league finish of 14th) often with late escapes, most notably against Leeds in 1987, where the Addicks triumphed in extra-time of the play-off final replay to secure their top flight place. In 1987 Charlton also returned to Wembley for the first time since the 1947 FA Cup final for the Full Members' Cup final against Blackburn. Eventually, Charlton were relegated in 1990 along with Sheffield Wednesday and bottom club Millwall. Manager Lennie Lawrence remained in charge for one more season before he accepted an offer to take charge of Middlesbrough. He was replaced by joint player-managers Alan Curbishley and Steve Gritt. The pair had unexpected success in their first season finishing just outside the play-offs, and 1992–93 began promisingly and Charlton looked good bets for promotion in the new Division One (the new name of the old Second Division following the formation of the Premier League). However, the club was forced to sell players such as Rob Lee to help pay for a return to The Valley, while club fans formed the Valley Party, nominating candidates to stand in local elections in 1990, pressing the local council to enable the club's return to The Valley – finally achieved in December 1992.

In March 1993, defender Tommy Caton, who had been out of action because of injury since January 1991, announced his retirement from playing on medical advice. He died suddenly at the end of the following month at the age of 30.

=== Premier League years (1998–2007) ===
In the summer of 1995, new chairman Richard Murray appointed Alan Curbishley as sole manager of Charlton. Under his sole leadership Charlton made an appearance in the play-offs in 1996 but were eliminated by Crystal Palace in the semi-finals and the following season brought a disappointing 15th-place finish. 1997–98 was Charlton's best season for years. They reached the Division One play-off final and battled against Sunderland in a thrilling game which ended with a 4–4 draw after extra time. Charlton won 7–6 on penalties, with the match described as "arguably the most dramatic game of football in Wembley's history", and were promoted to the Premier League.

Charlton's first Premier League campaign began promisingly (they went top after two games) but they were unable to maintain their good form and were soon battling relegation. The battle was lost on the final day of the season but the club's board kept faith in Curbishley, confident that they could bounce back. Curbishley rewarded the chairman's loyalty with the Division One title in 2000 which signalled a return to the Premier League.

After the club's Premier League comeback, Curbishley proved an astute spender, guiding the Addicks to a ninth place finish in the season after promotion and they were soon established as a mid table side who at times were in contention for a European place.

Charlton spent much of the 2003–04 Premier League season challenging for a Champions League place, but a late-season slump in form and the sale of star player Scott Parker to Chelsea, left Charlton in seventh place, which was still the club's highest finish since the 1950s. Charlton were unable to build on this level of achievement and Curbishley departed in 2006, with the club still established as a solid mid-table side.

In May 2006, Iain Dowie was named as Curbishley's successor, but was sacked after 12 league matches in November 2006, with only two wins. Les Reed replaced Dowie as manager, however he too failed to improve Charlton's position in the league table and on Christmas Eve 2006, Reed was replaced by former player Alan Pardew. Although results did improve, Pardew was unable to keep Charlton up and relegation was confirmed in the penultimate match of the season.

=== Relegation from the Premier League (2007–2014) ===
Charlton's return to the second tier of English football was a disappointment, with their promotion campaign tailing off to an 11th-place finish. Early in the following season the Addicks were linked with a foreign takeover, but this was swiftly denied by the club. On 10 October 2008, Charlton received an indicative offer for the club from a Dubai-based diversified investment company. However, the deal later fell through. The full significance of this soon became apparent as the club recorded net losses of over £13 million for that financial year. Pardew left on 22 November after a 2–5 home loss to Sheffield United that saw the team fall into the relegation places. Matters did not improve under caretaker manager Phil Parkinson, and the team went a club record 18 games without a win, a new club record, before finally achieving a 1–0 away victory over Norwich City in an FA Cup third round replay; Parkinson was hired on a permanent basis. The team were relegated to League One after a 2–2 draw against Blackpool on 18 April 2009.

The 2009–10 season, Charlton's first third-tier league campaign in 29 years, saw them occupy the top six for almost its entirety; they were defeated in the Football League One play-offs semi-final second leg on penalties against Swindon Town.

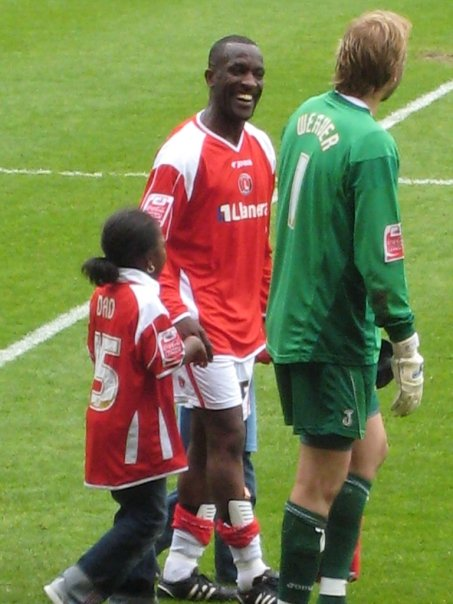
Former Charlton player Chris Powell returned to the club as manager between 2011 and 2014

After a change in ownership, Parkinson and Charlton legend Mark Kinsella left after a poor run of results. Another Charlton legend, Chris Powell, was appointed manager of the club in January 2011, winning his first game in charge 2–0 over Plymouth at The Valley. This was Charlton's first league win since November. Powell's bright start continued with a further three victories, before running into a downturn which saw the club go 11 games in succession without a win. Yet the fans' respect for Powell saw him come under remarkably little criticism. The club's fortunes picked up towards the end of the season, but leaving them far short of the play-offs. In a busy summer, Powell brought in 19 new players and after a successful season, on 14 April 2012, Charlton Athletic won promotion back to the Championship with a 1–0 away win at Carlisle United. A week later, on 21 April 2012, they were confirmed as champions after a 2–1 home win over Wycombe Wanderers. Charlton then lifted the League One trophy on 5 May 2012, having been in the top position since 15 September 2011, and after recording a 3–2 victory over Hartlepool United, recorded their highest ever league points score of 101, the highest in any professional European league that year.

In the first season back in the Championship, the 2012–13 season saw Charlton finish ninth place with 65 points, just three points short of the play-off places to the Premier League.

=== Duchâtelet's ownership (2014–2019) ===
In early January 2014 during the 2013–14 season, Belgian businessman Roland Duchâtelet took over Charlton as owner in a deal worth £14million. This made Charlton a part of a network of football clubs owned by Duchâtelet. On 11 March 2014, two days after an FA Cup quarter-final loss to Sheffield United, and with Charlton sitting bottom of the table, Powell was sacked, private emails suggesting a rift with the owner.

New manager Jose Riga, despite having to join Charlton long after the transfer window had closed, was able to improve Charlton's form and eventually guide them to 18th place, successfully avoiding relegation. After Riga's departure to manage Blackpool, former Millwall player Bob Peeters was appointed as manager in May 2014 on a 12-month contract. Charlton started strong, but a long run of draws meant that after only 25 games in charge Peeters was dismissed with the team in 14th place. His replacement, Guy Luzon, ensured there was no relegation battle by winning most of the remaining matches, resulting in a 12th-place finish.

The 2015–16 season began promisingly but results under Luzon deteriorated and on 24 October 2015 after a 3–0 defeat at home to Brentford he was sacked. Luzon said in a News Shopper interview that he "was not the one who chose how to do the recruitment" as the reason why he failed as manager. Karel Fraeye was appointed "interim head coach", but was sacked after 14 games and just two wins, with the club then second from bottom in the Championship. On 14 January 2016, Jose Riga was appointed head coach for a second spell, but could not prevent Charlton from being relegated to League One for the 2016–17 season. Riga resigned at the end of the season. To many fans, the managerial changes and subsequent relegation to League One were symptomatic of the mismanagement of the club under Duchâtelet's ownership and several protests began.

After a slow start to the new season, with the club in 15th place of League One, the club announced that it had "parted company" with Russell Slade in November 2016. Karl Robinson was appointed on a permanent basis soon after. He led the Addicks to an uneventful 13th-place finish. The following season Robinson had the team challenging for the play-offs, but a drop in form in March led him to resign by mutual consent. He was replaced by former player Lee Bowyer as caretaker manager who guided them to a 6th-place finish, but lost in the play-off semi-final.

Bowyer was appointed permanently in September on a one-year contract and managed Charlton to third place in the 2018–19 EFL League One season, qualifying for the play-offs. In their first visit to the New Wembley Stadium and a repeat of their famous match in 1998, Charlton beat Sunderland 2–1 in the League One play-off final to earn promotion back to the EFL Championship after a three-season absence. Bowyer later signed a new one-year contract following promotion, which was later extended to three years in January 2020.

=== Multiple changes of ownership (2019–present) ===
==== East Street Investments (2019–2020) ====
On 29 November 2019, Charlton Athletic was acquired by East Street Investments (ESI) from Abu Dhabi, subject to EFL approval. Approval was reportedly granted on 2 January 2020. However, on 10 March 2020, a public disagreement between the new owners erupted along with reports that the main investor was pulling out, and the EFL said the takeover had not been approved. The Valley and Charlton's training ground were still owned by Duchâtelet, and a transfer embargo was in place as the new owners had not provided evidence of funding through to June 2021. On 20 April 2020, the EFL said the club was being investigated for misconduct regarding the takeover. In June 2020, Charlton confirmed that ESI had been taken over by a consortium led by businessman Paul Elliott, and said it had contacted the EFL to finalise the ownership change. However, a legal dispute involving former ESI director Matt Southall continued. He attempted to regain control of the club to prevent Elliott's takeover from going ahead, but failed and was subsequently fined and dismissed for challenging the club's directors. On 7 August 2020, the EFL said three individuals, including ESI owner Elliott and lawyer Chris Farnell, had failed its Owners' and Directors' Test, leaving the club's ownership unclear; Charlton appealed against the decision. Meanwhile, Charlton were relegated to League One at the end of the 2019–20 season after finishing 22nd. Because of the COVID-19 pandemic, the final games of the season were played behind closed doors, which remained the case for the majority of the following season.

Later in August, Thomas Sandgaard, a Danish businessman based in Colorado, was reported to be negotiating to buy the club. After further court hearings, Elliott was granted an injunction blocking the sale of ESI until a hearing in November 2020.

==== Thomas Sandgaard (2020–2023) ====
On 25 September 2020, Thomas Sandgaard acquired the club itself from ESI, and was reported to have passed the EFL's Owners' and Directors' Tests; the EFL noted the change in control, but said the club's sale was now "a matter for the interested parties".

On 15 March 2021, with the club lying in eighth place, Bowyer resigned as club manager and was appointed manager of Birmingham City. His successor, Nigel Adkins, was appointed three days later. The club finished the 2020–21 season in seventh place, but started the following season by winning only two out of 13 League One matches and were in the relegation zone when Adkins was sacked on 21 October 2021.

After a successful spell as caretaker manager, Johnnie Jackson was appointed manager in December 2021, but after Charlton finished the season in 13th place, he was also sacked. Swindon Town manager Ben Garner was appointed as his replacement in June 2022, but was sacked on 5 December 2022 with the team in 17th place. Dean Holden was appointed manager on 20 December 2022, and Charlton improved to finish the 2022–23 season in 10th place.

==== SE7 Partners (2023–present) ====
On 5 June 2023, the club announced that SE7 Partners, comprising former Sunderland director Charlie Methven and Edward Warrick, had agreed a takeover of Charlton Athletic, becoming the club's fourth set of owners in under four years. On 19 July, the EFL and FA cleared SE7 Partners to take over the club, and the deal was completed on 21 July 2023. On 27 August 2023, after one win in the opening six games of the 2023–24 season, Holden was sacked as manager, and succeeded by Michael Appleton. On 23 January 2024, following a 3–2 defeat at The Valley against Northampton Town and no wins in 10 League One games, Appleton was sacked. He was replaced on 4 February 2024 by Nathan Jones, under whom Charlton lost one and drew three of their next four games as they matched the club's longest winless streak of 18 games. The winless run ended with a 2–1 win away to Derby County on 27 February 2024, beginning what became a 14-match unbeaten run, Charlton's longest in 24 years. However, Charlton finished the season in 16th place - their worst finishing league position in 98 years. Despite a disappointing season, Charlton striker Alfie May won the League One Golden Boot award for the 2023–24 EFL League One season with his tally of 23 goals.

The following season, Charlton won promotion back to the Championship with a 1–0 victory over Leyton Orient in the League One play-off final at Wembley on 25 May 2025, thanks to a Macauley Gillesphey free-kick. On 6 December 2025, Charlton's Championship match against Portsmouth at The Valley was abandoned after Charlton Athletic supporter of the year Norman Barker (known as "Headphones Norm") collapsed and later died in hospital. Charlton secured Championship safety with a 2–1 home win over Hull City on 25 April 2026. The Guardian reported that SE7 Partners had put Charlton up for sale in August 2026, but the report was disputed by chairman Gavin Carter, who stated that the owners were only seeking additional investment.

== Club identity ==
=== Colours and crest ===
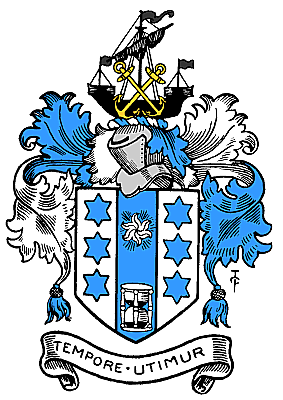
Crest of the former Metropolitan Borough of Greenwich Council, used by Charlton briefly in late 1940s and early 1950s

Charlton have used a number of crests and badges during their history, although the current design has not been changed since 1968. The first known badge, from the 1930s, consisted of the letters CAF in the shape of a club from a pack of cards. In the 1940s, Charlton used a design featuring a robin sitting in a football within a shield, sometimes with the letters CAFC in the four-quarters of the shield, which was worn for the 1946 FA Cup final. In the late 1940s and early 1950s, the crest of the former Metropolitan Borough of Greenwich was used as a symbol for the club, although it did not appear on the team's shirts. A translation of the borough's Latin motto, Tempore utimur, ("We use time"), refers symbolically to the Prime Meridian in Greenwich.

In 1963, a competition was held to find a new badge for the club, and the winning entry was a hand holding a sword, which complied with Charlton's nickname of the time, the Valiants. Over the next five years modifications were made to this design, such as the addition of a circle surrounding the hand and sword and including the club's name in the badge. By 1968, the design had reached the one known today, and has been used continuously from this year, apart from a period in the 1970s when just the letters CAFC appeared on the team's shirts.

The red and white colours were chosen by the first teenagers who formed Charlton Athletic, and the first kits were made using material bought from a drapery shop in nearby Woolwich. Despite popular belief, they were not borrowed kits from Woolwich Arsenal. With the exception of one season, Charlton have always played in red and white. The exception came during part of the 1923–24 season when Charlton wore the colours of Catford Southend as part of the proposed move to Catford, which were light and dark blue stripes. However, after the move fell through, Charlton returned to wearing red and white as their home colours.

The sponsors were as follows:

Year	Kit manufacturer	Main shirt sponsor	Back of shirt sponsor	Shorts sponsor	Main shirt sleeve sponsor
1974–80	Bukta	None	None		
1980–81	Adidas	None	None		
1981–82	Adidas	FADS	None		
1982–83	Adidas	None	None		
1983–84	Osca	None	None		
1984–86	Osca	The Woolwich	None		
1986–88	Adidas	The Woolwich	None		
1988–92	Admiral	The Woolwich	None		
1992–93	Ribero	None	None		
1993–94	Ribero	Viglen	None		
1994–98	Quaser	Viglen	None		
1998–00	Le Coq Sportif	MESH	None		
2000–02	Le Coq Sportif	Redbus	None		
2002–03	Le Coq Sportif	All:Sports	None		
2003–05	Joma	All:Sports	None		
2005–08	Joma	Llanera	None		
2008–09	Joma	Carbrini Sportswear	None		
2009	Joma	Kent Reliance Building Society	None		
2010–12	Macron	Kent Reliance Building Society	None		
2012–14	Nike	Andrews Sykes	None		
2014–16	Nike	University of Greenwich	Andrews Sykes	Mitsubishi Electric	None
2016–17	Nike	BETDAQ	ITRM	Emmaus Consulting	None
2017–19	Hummel	BETDAQ	ITRM	Gaughan Services	None
2019–20	Hummel	Children with Cancer UK	ITRM	Cannon Glass	None
2020–21	Hummel	KW Holdings (home); Vitech Services (away)	ITRM	Cannon Glass	None
2021–22	Hummel	KW Holdings (home & third); Walker Mower (away)	ITRM		None
2022–25	Castore	RSK Group (home); University of Greenwich (away)		Generous Robots DAO	None
2025–26	Reebok	RSK Group	University of Greenwich	MaxAmaze	Christopher Ward
2026–	Reebok	RSK Group	TodayTix		Christopher Ward

=== Nicknames ===
Charlton's most common nickname is The Addicks. The origin of this name is from a local fishmonger, Arthur "Ikey" Bryan, who rewarded the team with meals of haddock and chips.

The progression of the nickname can be seen in the book The Addicks Cartoons: An Affectionate Look into the Early History of Charlton Athletic, which covers the pre-First World War history of Charlton through a narrative based on 56 cartoons which appeared in the now defunct Kentish Independent. The very first cartoon, from 31 October 1908, calls the team the Haddocks. By 1910, the name had changed to Addicks although it also appeared as Haddick. The club also have two other nicknames, The Robins, adopted in 1931, and The Valiants, chosen in a fan competition in the 1960s which also led to the adoption of the sword badge which is still in use. The Addicks nickname never went away and was revived by fans after the club lost its Valley home in 1985 and went into exile at Crystal Palace. It is now once again the official nickname of the club.

Charlton fans' chants have included "Valley, Floyd Road", a song noting the stadium's address to the tune of "Mull of Kintyre".

== Stadium ==
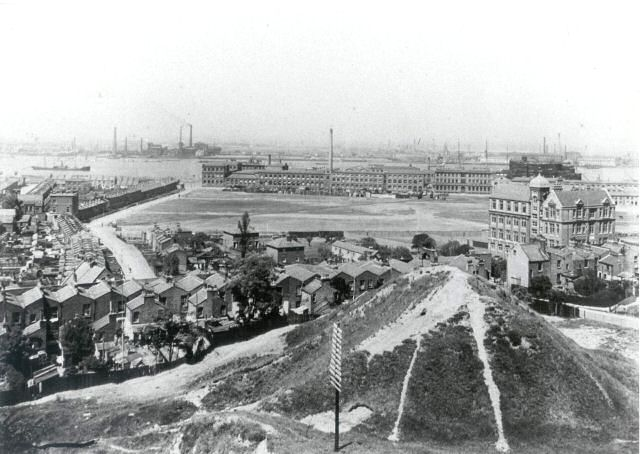
One of Charlton's early grounds, Siemens Meadow

The club's first ground was Siemens Meadow (1905–1907), a patch of rough ground by the River Thames, over-shadowed by the Siemens Brothers Telegraph Works. Then followed Woolwich Common (1907–1908), Pound Park (1908–1913), and Angerstein Lane (1913–1915). After the end of the First World War, a chalk quarry known as the Swamps was identified as Charlton's new ground and, in the summer of 1919, work began to create the level playing area and remove debris from the site.

In September 1919, the first match was played at that site, now the club's current ground, known as The Valley. Charlton stayed at The Valley until 1923, when the club moved to The Mount stadium in Catford as part of a proposed merger with Catford Southend. However, after that move collapsed in 1924, Charlton returned to The Valley.

During the 1930s and 1940s, significant improvements were made to the ground, making it one of the largest in the country at that time. In 1938 the highest attendance to date at the ground was recorded at over 75,000 for a FA Cup match against Aston Villa. During the 1940s and 1950s the attendance was often above 40,000, and Charlton had one of the largest support bases in the country. However, after the club's relegation little investment was made in The Valley as it fell into decline.

In the 1980s matters came to a head as the ownership of the club and The Valley was divided. The large East Terrace had been closed down by the authorities after the Bradford City stadium fire, and the ground's owner wanted to use part of the site for housing. In September 1985, Charlton made the controversial move to ground-share with South London neighbours Crystal Palace at Selhurst Park. This move was unpopular with supporters and, in the late 1980s, significant steps were taken to bring about the club's return to The Valley.

A single issue political party, the Valley Party, contested the 1990 Greenwich Council election on a ticket of reopening the stadium, capturing 11% of the vote, aiding the club's return. The Valley Gold investment scheme was created to help supporters fund the return to The Valley, and several players were also sold to raise funds. For the 1991–92 season and part of the 1992–93 season, the Addicks played at West Ham's Upton Park as Wimbledon had moved into Selhurst Park alongside Crystal Palace. Charlton finally returned to The Valley in December 1992, celebrating with a 1–0 victory against Portsmouth.

Following the return to The Valley, three sides of the ground were completely redeveloped, turning the venue into a modern, all-seater stadium with a 27,111 capacity, which is currently the biggest in South London, ahead of Millwall and Crystal Palace. There were plans to increase the ground's capacity to approximately 31,000 and eventually 40,000, although these plans were abandoned following Charlton's relegation from the Premier League in 2007.

A youth-specific section for supporters aged 16 to 20 was created in March 2024, the first of its kind in the UK, inspired by Djurgården IF's "Apberget" section. Safe standing areas were installed in April 2024, a new Desso GrassMaster pitch was laid in May 2024, and a matchday fan zone was set up in the West Stand car park. The Valley's old big screen was replaced in October 2025, and brand new LED digiboards were installed on all four sides of the pitch.

== Supporters and rivalries ==
The bulk of the club's support base comes from South East London and Kent, particularly the London boroughs of Greenwich, Bexley and Bromley. Supporters played a key role in the return of the club to The Valley in 1992 and were rewarded by being granted a voice on the board in the form of an elected supporter director. Any season ticket holder could put themselves forward for election, with a certain number of nominations, and votes were cast by all season ticket holders over the age of 18. The last such director, Ben Hayes, was elected in 2006 to serve until 2008, when the role was discontinued as a result of legal issues. Its functions were replaced by a fans forum, which met for the first time in December 2008 and is still active to this day.

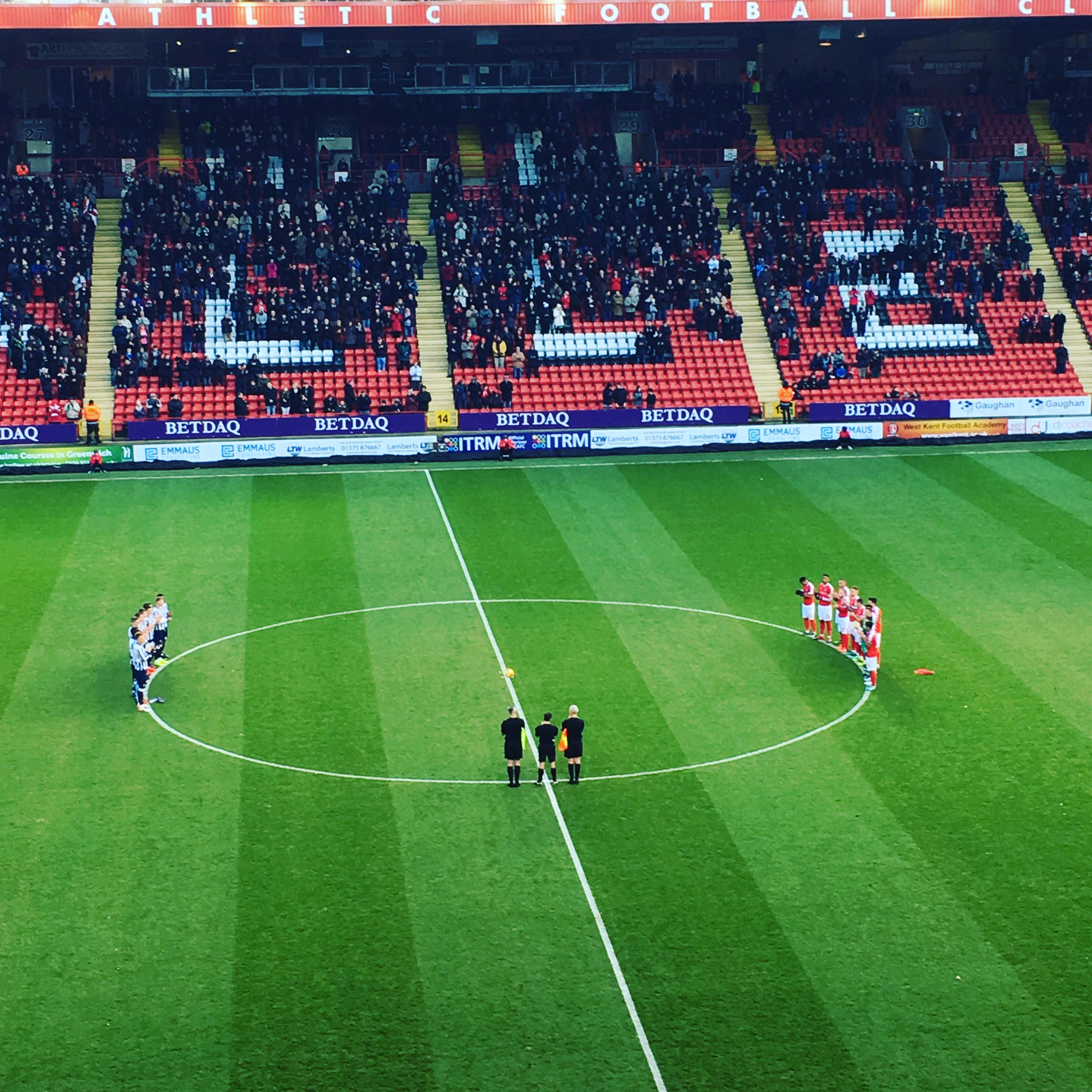
Charlton and Millwall pay tribute to Graham Taylor at The Valley in January 2017.

Charlton's main rivals are their South London neighbours, Crystal Palace and Millwall.

In 1985, Charlton were forced to ground-share with Crystal Palace after safety concerns at The Valley. They played their home fixtures at the Glaziers' Selhurst Park stadium until 1991. The arrangement was seen by Crystal Palace chairman Ron Noades as essential for the future of football, but it was unpopular with both sets of fans. Charlton fans campaigned for a return to The Valley throughout their time at Selhurst Park. In 2005, Palace were relegated by Charlton at The Valley after a 2–2 draw. Palace needed a win to survive. However, with seven minutes left, Charlton equalised, relegating their rivals. Post-match, there was a well-publicised altercation between the two chairmen of the respective clubs, Richard Murray and Simon Jordan. Since their first meeting in the Football League in 1925, Charlton have won 17, drawn 13 and lost 26 games against Palace. The teams last met in 2015, a 4–1 win for Palace in the League Cup.

Charlton are closest in proximity to Millwall than any other EFL club, with The Valley and The Den being less than four miles (6.4 km) apart. They last met in January 2026, a 4–0 win for Millwall at The Den. Since their first Football League game in 1921, Charlton have won 11, drawn 27 and lost 38 league games (the two sides also met twice in the Anglo-Italian Cup in the 1992–93 season; Charlton winning one tie, and one draw). The Addicks have not beaten Millwall in the last 14 league fixtures between the sides; their last win came on 9 March 1996 at The Valley.

== In popular culture ==
=== Film and TV ===
After promotion to Division 1 in 1936, the British Pathé company visited The Valley to film the players training. The commentary noted a "proud boast" that not a single player during their year in Division 2 was "cautioned". The subsequent film, Famous Football Teams at Home. No.5: Charlton Athletic (canister:PT 353, media URN: 39727), was released on 28 December 1936, and contains clear views of the early stadium. British Movietone News filmed the sixth-round (quarter-final) FA Cup match versus Preston North End, at The Valley, on 1 March 1947, which Charlton won 2–1. The commentary was by Lionel Gamlin. It begins by showing German prisoners of war clearing snow from the former East terrace. (For identification purposes, the video i.d., is: BM48249. The film's Friendly Key, is: 470306131). Charlton Athletic assumes a pivotal role in the film The Silent Playground (1963). Three children get in to trouble when their mother's boyfriend 'Uncle' Alan (John Ronane), gives them pocket money to wander off on their own, so that he can attend a Charlton football match. There is some footage from the ground which Ronane is later seen leaving. In the long-running BBC sitcom Only Fools and Horses, Rodney Charlton Trotter (played by Nicholas Lyndhurst) is named after the club. In the BBC science-fiction series Doctor Who, the Seventh Doctor's companion named Ace (played by Sophie Aldred) wears a Charlton Athletic badge on her black bomber jacket. A Charlton Athletic match against Manchester United in the 1950s is depicted in BBC Two television film United (released in 2011). The Valley and manager Alan Curbishley made cameo appearances in the Sky One sports drama Dream Team. Charlton Athletic featured in the ITV one-off drama Albert's Memorial, shown on 12 September 2010 and starring David Jason and David Warner. A young Billy Butcher has a Charlton flag in his room in Amazon Prime Video superhero series The Boys.

=== Books ===
Charlton Athletic has also featured in several book publications, in both fictional and factual sports writing. These include works by Charlie Connelly and Paul Breen's work of popular fiction which is entitled The Charlton Men. The book is set against Charlton's successful 2011–12 season when they won the League One title and promotion back to the Championship in concurrence with the 2011 London riots. Jen Offord wrote a book called The Year of the Robin, released in June 2022, which focuses on Charlton's difficult 2019–20 season. Timothy Young, the protagonist in Out of the Shelter, a 1970 novel by David Lodge, supports Charlton Athletic. The book describes Timothy listening to Charlton's victory in the 1947 FA Cup final on the radio.

== Records and statistics ==
- Sam Bartram is Charlton's record appearance maker, having played a total of 623 times between 1934 and 1956. But for six years lost to the Second World War, when no league football was played, this tally would be far higher.
- Keith Peacock is the club's second highest appearance maker with 591 games between 1962 and 1979 He was also the first-ever substitute in a Football League game, replacing injured goalkeeper Mike Rose after 11 minutes of a match against Bolton Wanderers on 21 August 1965.
- Defender and midfielder Radostin Kishishev is Charlton's record international appearance maker, having received 42 caps for Bulgaria while a Charlton player.
- In total, 12 Charlton players have received full England caps. The first was Seth Plum, in 1923 and the most recent was Darren Bent, in 2006. Luke Young, with seven caps, is Charlton's most capped England international.
- Charlton's record goalscorer is Derek Hales, who scored 168 times in all competitions in 368 matches, during two spells, for the club.
- Counting only league goals, Stuart Leary is the club's record scorer with 153 goals between 1951 and 1962.
- The record number of goals scored in one season is 33, scored by Ralph Allen in the 1934–35 season.
- Charlton's record home attendance is 75,031 which was set on 12 February 1938 for an FA Cup match against Aston Villa.
- The record all-seated attendance is 27,111, The Valley's current capacity. This record was first set in September 2005 in a Premier League match against Chelsea and has since been equalled several times.

Achievement	Record (year, division)
Highest league finish	Runners-up in 1936–37 (First Division)
Most league points in a season	101 in 2011–2012 (League One)
Most league goals in a season	107 in 1957–58 (Second Division)
Record victory	8–0 v. Stevenage, 9 October 2018
Record away victory	8–0 v. Stevenage, 9 October 2018
Record defeat	1–11 v. Aston Villa, 14 November 1959
Record FA Cup victory	7–0 v. Burton Albion, 7 January 1956
Record League Cup victory	5–0 v. Brentford, 12 August 1980
Most successive victories	12 matches (from 26 December 1999 to 7 March 2000)
Most games without a win	18 matches (from 18 October 2008 to 13 January 2009; and 2 December 2023 to 24 February 2024)
Most successive defeats	10 matches (from 11 April 1990 to 15 September 1990)
Most successive draws	6 matches (from 13 December 1992 to 16 January 1993)
Longest unbeaten	15 matches (from 4 October 1980 to 20 December 1980)
Record attendance	75,031 v. Aston Villa, 17 October 1938
Record league attendance	68,160 v. Arsenal, 17 October 1936
Record gate receipts	£400,920 v. Leicester City, 19 February 2005

=== Player records ===
Achievement	Player (record)
Most appearances	Sam Bartram (623)
Most appearances (outfield)	Keith Peacock (591)
Most goals	Derek Hales (168)
Most hat-tricks	Johnny Summers and Eddie Firmani (8)
Most capped player	Dennis Rommedahl (126)
Most capped player while at the club	Radostin Kishishev (42)
Oldest player	Sam Bartram (42 years and 47 days)
Youngest player	Jonjo Shelvey (16 years and 59 days)
Oldest scorer	Chris Powell (38 years and 239 days)
Youngest scorer	Jonjo Shelvey (16 years and 310 days)
Quickest scorer	Jim Melrose (9 seconds)
Quickest sending off	Naby Sarr (1 minute)

== Players ==
As of 22 November 2026

=== First-team squad ===
Note: Flags indicate national team as defined under FIFA eligibility rules; some limited exceptions apply. Players may hold more than one non-FIFA nationality.

No.	Pos.	Nation	Player
2	DF	ENG	Kayne Ramsay
3	DF	SCO	Josh Edwards
4	DF	ENG	Reece Burke
5	DF	ENG	Lloyd Jones (captain)
6	MF	IRL	Conor Coventry
7	FW	JAM	Tyreece Campbell
8	MF	ENG	Harvey Knibbs
9	FW	ENG	Karlan Grant
11	FW	ENG	Miles Leaburn
12	DF	FRA	Billy Koumetio
13	GK	NGR	Arthur Okonkwo (on loan from Wrexham)
14	MF	ENG	Sonny Carey
15	MF	ENG	Nathaniel Chalobah
16	MF	KEN	Timothy Ouma (on loan from Slavia Prague)
17	DF	JAM	Amari'i Bell
18	DF	SVK	Ivan Mesík

No.	Pos.	Nation	Player
19	FW	IRL	Millenic Alli
20	DF	IRL	Danny McNamara
21	GK	IRL	Tiernan Brooks
23	FW	USA	Charlie Kelman
24	FW	ENG	Matt Godden
25	GK	ENG	Will Mannion
26	MF	ENG	Joe Rankin-Costello
28	DF	KEN	Collins Sichenje
30	MF	SCO	Rob Apter
32	MF	ENG	Alan Mwamba
33	FW	ENG	Micah Mbick
34	MF	ENG	Oliver Skipp (on loan from Leicester City)
35	FW	ESP	Junior Nkeng
44	DF	NZL	Tyler Bindon (on loan from Nottingham Forest)
—	DF	ENG	Zach Mitchell

=== Out on loan ===
Note: Flags indicate national team as defined under FIFA eligibility rules; some limited exceptions apply. Players may hold more than one non-FIFA nationality.

No.	Pos.	Nation	Player
1	GK	BEL	Thomas Kaminski (at Omonia)
22	FW	ENG	Tanto Olaofe (at Lincoln City)
27	MF	ENG	Ibrahim Fullah (at Milton Keynes Dons)
29	FW	SLE	Daniel Kanu (at Notts County)
31	DF	UGA	Nathan Asiimwe (at Salford City)
36	DF	ENG	Keenan Gough (at Bristol Rovers)
38	DF	FIJ	Josh Laqeretabua (at Eastleigh)

No.	Pos.	Nation	Player
—	GK	ENG	Finley Woodham (at Billericay Town)
—	DF	ENG	Ty Ewens-Findlay (at Crawley Town)
—	MF	ENG	Kai Enslin (at Dorking Wanderers)
—	MF	ENG	Jacob Safa (at Carshalton Athletic)
—	MF	ENG	Henry Rylah (at Solihull Moors)
—	FW	MAR	Gassan Ahadme (at Cambridge United)

=== Under-21s squad ===
Note: Flags indicate national team as defined under FIFA eligibility rules; some limited exceptions apply. Players may hold more than one non-FIFA nationality.

No.	Pos.	Nation	Player
39	MF	FIN	Otto Tiitinen (on loan from Ilves)
53	FW	ENG	Bradley Tagoe
62	FW	ENG	Josh Hebert
—	GK	ENG	George Hardy
—	GK	SCO	Lyndon Tas
—	DF	ENG	Ethan Brown
—	DF	ENG	Dionte Davis
—	DF	ENG	Tate Elliott
—	DF	ENG	Marley Rayment-Dawkins

No.	Pos.	Nation	Player
—	DF	ENG	Phoenix Valentine
—	MF	ENG	Jack Belton
—	MF	JAM	Nehmani McNamee-Burke
—	MF	ENG	Manu Wales
—	MF	ENG	Sam Washington-Amoah
—	FW	ENG	Shia-Lee Burnham
—	FW	ENG	Ellis McMillan
—	FW	ENG	Reuben Reid
—	FW	ENG	Emmanuel Sol-Loza

=== Under-18s squad ===
Note: Flags indicate national team as defined under FIFA eligibility rules; some limited exceptions apply. Players may hold more than one non-FIFA nationality.

No.	Pos.	Nation	Player
—	GK	ENG	Logan Williams
—	DF	ENG	Noah Grover-Smith
—	DF	ENG	Theo Laronde
—	DF	ENG	Ayden Minto-St Aimie
—	DF	ENG	Taku Muvhuti
—	DF	NIR	Cameron Reid
—	DF	ENG	Mikhail Simons
—	MF	ENG	Patrick Boje
—	MF	ENG	Zaino Christian

No.	Pos.	Nation	Player
—	MF	ENG	Kit Fleming
—	MF	ENG	Michael Mylona
—	MF	ENG	Kacper Podgorny
—	MF	ENG	Harry Randall
—	MF	ENG	Ed Thomas
—	FW	ENG	Kayode Peterkin
—	FW	ENG	Raynon Richman
—	FW	ENG	Jayden Twum

=== Player of the Year ===
- 1971 (England) Paul Went
- 1972 (England) Keith Peacock
- 1973 (England) Arthur Horsfield
- 1974 (England) John Dunn
- 1975 (England) Richie Bowman
- 1976 (England) Derek Hales
- 1977 (England) Mike Flanagan
- 1978 (England) Keith Peacock
- 1979 (England) Keith Peacock
- 1980 (England) Les Berry
- 1981 (England) Nicky Johns
- 1982 (England) Terry Naylor
- 1983 (England) Nicky Johns
- 1984 (England) Nicky Johns
- 1985 (Wales) Mark Aizlewood
- 1986 (Wales) Mark Aizlewood
- 1987 (England) Bob Bolder
- 1988 (England) John Humphrey
- 1989 (England) John Humphrey
- 1990 (England) John Humphrey
- 1991 (England) Rob Lee
- 1992 (England) Simon Webster
- 1993 (Scotland) Stuart Balmer
- 1994 (England) Carl Leaburn
- 1995 (England) Richard Rufus
- 1996 (Wales) John Robinson
- 1997 (Australia) Andy Petterson
- 1998 (Republic of Ireland) Mark Kinsella
- 1999 (Republic of Ireland) Mark Kinsella
- 2000 (England) Richard Rufus
- 2001 (England) Richard Rufus
- 2002 (Republic of Ireland) Dean Kiely
- 2003 (England) Scott Parker
- 2004 (Republic of Ireland) Dean Kiely
- 2005 (England) Luke Young
- 2006 (England) Darren Bent
- 2007 (England) Scott Carson
- 2008 (Republic of Ireland) Matt Holland
- 2009 (England) Nicky Bailey
- 2010 (Scotland) Christian Dailly
- 2011 (Portugal) José Semedo
- 2012 (England) Chris Solly
- 2013 (England) Chris Solly
- 2014 (Uruguay) Diego Poyet
- 2015 (England) Jordan Cousins
- 2016 (England) Jordan Cousins
- 2017 (England) Ricky Holmes
- 2018 (Wales) Jay DaSilva
- 2019 (Montserrat) Lyle Taylor
- 2020 (England) Dillon Phillips
- 2021 (England) Jake Forster-Caskey
- 2022 (England) George Dobson
- 2023 (Ghana) Jesurun Rak-Sakyi
- 2024 (England) Alfie May
- 2025 (England) Lloyd Jones
- 2026 (England) Lloyd Jones

== Club officials ==
As of 25 September 2026

=== Coaching staff ===
Role	Name
First Team Manager	(Wales) Nathan Jones
First Team Assistant Manager	(Republic of Ireland) Curtis Fleming
Set Piece and First-Team Coach	(England) Danny Hylton
First Team Goalkeeping Coach	(Republic of Ireland) Stephen Henderson
Individual Development Coach	(England) Dave Huzzey
Head of Sports Science	(England) Luke Sanders
First-Team Doctor	(England) Toby Longwill
Head of Physical Performance	(England) Josh Hornby
First-Team Head Physiotherapist	(England) Adam Coe
First-Team Physiotherapist	(Hong Kong) Alex Ng
First-Team Assistant Therapist	(England) Steve Jackson
Head of Performance Analysis	(England) Pete Booker
First-Team Kit Manager	(England) Harry Williams
Head of Player Care	(England) Jack Tebbutt
Academy Manager	(England) Tom Pell
Academy Head of Coaching	(England) Rhys Williams
Senior Professional Development Phase Lead Coach	(England) Jason Pearce
Lead U21s Coach	(England) Chris Lock
Professional Development Phase Coach	(England) Chris Solly
Professional Development Phase Coach	(England) Jamie Day
Head of Academy Sport Science and Medicine	(England) Danny Campbell
Senior Academy Scout	(England) Bert Dawkins
Academy Performance Analyst	(England) James Parker
Academy Physiotherapist	(England) Andriana Tsiantoula
Kit Assistant	(England) Ben Mehmet
Kit Assistant	(England) James Simmons

=== Managerial history ===
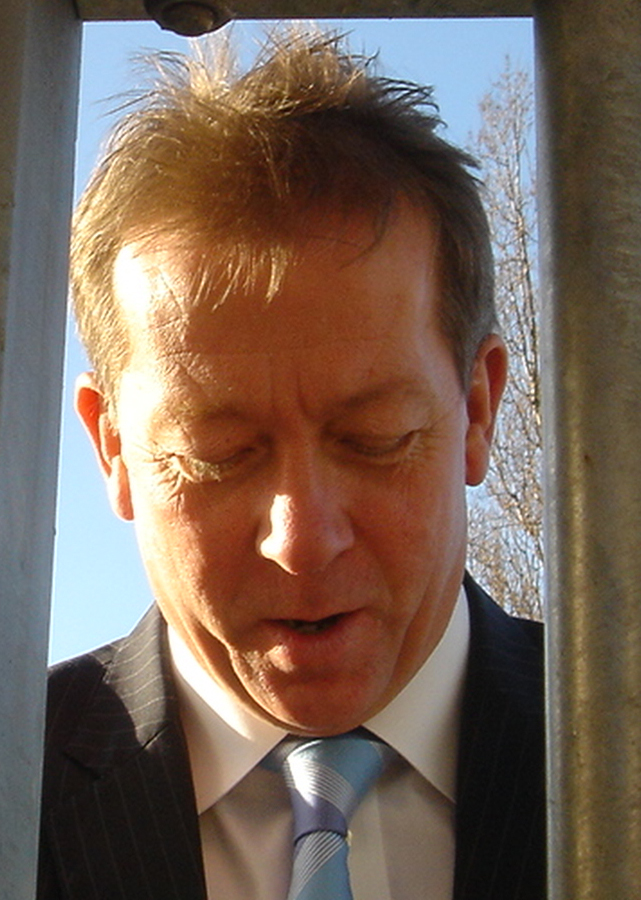
Alan Curbishley managed Charlton between 1991 and 2006

Name	Dates	Achievements
(England) Walter Rayner	June 1920 – May 1925	
(Scotland) Alex MacFarlane	May 1925 – January 1928	
(England) Albert Lindon	January 1928 – June 1928	
(Scotland) Alex MacFarlane	June 1928 – December 1932	Third Division champions (1929)
(England) Albert Lindon	December 1932 – May 1933	
(England) Jimmy Seed	May 1933 – September 1956	Third Division champions (1935); Second Division runners-up (1936); First Division runners-up (1937); Football League War Cup co-winners (1944); FA Cup runners-up 1946; FA Cup winners 1947
(England) David Clark (caretaker)	September 1956	
(England) Jimmy Trotter	September 1956 – October 1961	
(England) David Clark (caretaker)	October 1961 – November 1961	
(Scotland) Frank Hill	November 1961 – August 1965	
(England) Bob Stokoe	August 1965 – September 1967	
(Italy) Eddie Firmani	September 1967 – March 1970	
(Republic of Ireland) Theo Foley	March 1970 – April 1974	
(England) Les Gore (caretaker)	April 1974 – May 1974	
(England) Andy Nelson	May 1974 – March 1980	Third Division 3rd place (promoted; 1975)
(England) Mike Bailey	March 1980 – June 1981	Third Division 3rd place (promoted; 1981)
(England) Alan Mullery	June 1981 – June 1982	
(England) Ken Craggs	June 1982 – November 1982	
(England) Lennie Lawrence	November 1982 – July 1991	Division Two runners-up (1986); Full Members' Cup runners-up (1987)
(England) Alan Curbishley & (England) Steve Gritt	July 1991 – June 1995	
(England) Alan Curbishley	June 1995 – May 2006	First Division play-off winners (1998); First Division champions (2000)
(Northern Ireland) Iain Dowie	May 2006 – November 2006	
(England) Les Reed	November 2006 – December 2006	
(England) Alan Pardew	December 2006 – November 2008	
(England) Phil Parkinson	November 2008 – January 2011	
(England) Keith Peacock (caretaker)	January 2011	
(England) Chris Powell	January 2011 – March 2014	League One champions (2012)
(Belgium) José Riga	March 2014 – May 2014	
(Belgium) Bob Peeters	May 2014 – January 2015	
(England) Damian Matthew & (England) Ben Roberts (caretakers)	January 2015	
(Israel) Guy Luzon	January 2015 – October 2015	
(Belgium) Karel Fraeye	October 2015 – January 2016	
(Belgium) José Riga	January 2016 – May 2016	
(England) Russell Slade	June 2016 – November 2016	
(England) Kevin Nugent (caretaker)	November 2016	
(England) Karl Robinson	November 2016 – March 2018	
(England) Lee Bowyer (caretaker)	March 2018 – September 2018	
(England) Lee Bowyer	September 2018 – March 2021	League One play-off winners (2019)
(England) Johnnie Jackson (caretaker)	March 2021	
(England) Nigel Adkins	March 2021 – October 2021	
(England) Johnnie Jackson (caretaker)	October 2021 – December 2021	
(England) Johnnie Jackson	December 2021 – May 2022	
(England) Ben Garner	June 2022 – December 2022	
(Republic of Ireland) Anthony Hayes (caretaker)	December 2022	
(England) Dean Holden	December 2022 – August 2023	
(England) Jason Pearce (caretaker)	August 2023 – September 2023	
(England) Michael Appleton	September 2023 – January 2024	
(Republic of Ireland) Curtis Fleming (caretaker)	January 2024 – February 2024	
(Wales) Nathan Jones	February 2024 –	League One play-off winners (2025)

=== List of chairmen ===
Year	Name
1921–1924	Douglas Oliver
1924–1932	Edwin Radford
1932–1951	Albert Gliksten
1951–1962	Stanley Gliksten
1962–1982	Michael Gliksten
1982–1983	Mark Hulyer
1983	Richard Collins
1983–1984	Mark Hulyer
1984	John Fryer
1984–1985	Jimmy Hill
1985–1987	John Fryer
1987–1989	Richard Collins
1989–1995	Roger Alwen
1995–2008	Richard Murray (PLC)
1995–2008	Martin Simons
2008–2010	Derek Chappell
2008–2010	Richard Murray
2010–2014	Michael Slater
2014–2020	Richard Murray
2020	Matt Southall
2020–2023	Thomas Sandgaard
2024	James Rodwell
2024–	Gavin Carter

== Honours ==
League

- First Division (level 1)
  - Runners-up: 1936–37
- Second Division / First Division (level 2)
  - Champions: 1999–2000
  - 2nd place promotion: 1935–36, 1985–86
  - Play-off winners: 1987, 1998
- Third Division South / Third Division / League One (level 3)
  - Champions: 1928–29 (South), 1934–35 (South), 2011–12
  - 3rd place promotion: 1974–75, 1980–81
  - Play-off winners: 2019, 2025

Cup

- FA Cup
  - Winners: 1946–47
  - Runners-up: 1945–46
- Full Members' Cup
  - Runners-up: 1986–87
- Football League War Cup
  - Joint winners: 1943–44
- Kent Senior Cup
  - Winners: 1994–95, 2012–13, 2014–15
  - Runners-up: 1995–96, 2015–16
- London Senior Cup
  - Winners: 2022–23, 2023–24

== See also ==
- Football in London
